= List of Persea species =

Persea is a genus of evergreen trees belonging to the laurel family, Lauraceae, which includes 111 species. The best-known member of the genus is the avocado, P. americana, widely cultivated in subtropical regions for its large, edible fruit. There are more than 200 synonyms in the genus.

== Accepted species ==
- Persea alba Nees & Mart.
- Persea albida Kosterm.
- Persea albiramea van der Werff
- Persea alpigena (Sw.) Spreng.
- Persea americana Mill.
- Persea areolatocostae (C.K.Allen) van der Werff
- Persea aurata Miq.
- Persea barbujana (Cav.) Mabb. & Nieto Fel.
- Persea basiobtusa Rohwer
- Persea benthamiana Meisn.
- Persea bernardii L.E.Kopp
- Persea bilocularis L.E.Kopp
- Persea boldufolia Mez
- Persea brenesii Standl.
- Persea brevipes Meisn.
- Persea brevipetiolata van der Werff
- Persea buchtienii O.C.Schmidt
- Persea bullata L.E.Kopp
- Persea caerulea (Ruiz & Pav.) Mez
- Persea caesia Meisn.
- Persea calva Rohwer & van der Werff
- Persea campii L.E.Kopp
- Persea chamissonis Mez
- Persea chrysantha Lorea-Hern.
- Persea chrysophylla L.E.Kopp
- Persea cinerascens Blake
- Persea conferta L.E.Kopp
- Persea cordata Meisn.
- Persea corymbosa Mez
- Persea costata Meisn.
- Persea croatii van der Werff
- Persea croizatii van der Werff
- Persea cuatrecasasii Kosterm.
- Persea cuneata Meisn.
- Persea donnell-smithii Mez
- Persea dryadum Rohwer
- Persea fastigiata L.E.Kopp
- Persea fendleri van der Werff
- Persea ferruginea Kunth
- Persea filipes Rusby
- Persea fuliginosa Nees & Mart.
- Persea fulva L.E.Kopp
- Persea fusca Mez
- Persea glabra van der Werff
- Persea grandiflora L.E.Kopp
- Persea haenkeana Mez
- Persea hexanthera L.E. Kopp
- Persea hintonii C.K. Allen
- Persea hirta Nees
- Persea hypoleuca (A.Rich.) Mez
- Persea indica (L.) Spreng.
- Persea jariensis Vattimo-Gil
- Persea jenmanii Mez
- Persea julianae van der Werff
- Persea kostermansii I.M.Turner
- Persea krugii Mez
- Persea laevifolia van der Werff
- Persea lemensis H.Ferrer & Sanoja
- Persea liebmannii Mez
- Persea lingue (Miers ex Bertero) Nees
- Persea longipes (Schltdl.) Meisn.
- Persea maguirei L.E.Kopp
- Persea major (Meisn.) L.E.Kopp
- Persea meridensis L.E.Kopp
- Persea meziana Rasingam & Karthig.
- Persea microneura Meisn.
- Persea mutisii Kunth
- Persea negracotensis O.C.Schmidt
- Persea nivea Mez
- Persea nudigemma van der Werff
- Persea oblongifolia L.E.Kopp
- Persea obovata Nees & Mart.
- Persea obscura Lorea-Hern.
- Persea obtusifolia L.E.Kopp
- Persea pajonalis van der Werff
- Persea pallescens (Mez) Lorea-Hern.
- Persea pedunculosa Meisn.
- Persea perglauca Lundell
- Persea perseiphylla (C.K.Allen) van der Werff
- Persea peruviana Nees
- Persea povedae W.C.Burger
- Persea psammophila P.L.R.Moraes
- Persea pseudofasciculata L.E.Kopp
- Persea pumila P.L.R.Moraes & R.S.Pacheco
- Persea punctata Meisn.
- Persea purpusii L.E.Kopp
- Persea quarciticola P.L.R.Moraes & Brotto
- Persea raimondii O.Schmidt
- Persea rigens C.K.Allen
- Persea rigida Nees & Mart.
- Persea rufescens Lundell
- Persea rufotomentosa Nees & Mart.
- Persea ruizii J.F.Macbr.
- Persea schiedeana Nees
- Persea sericea Kunth
- Persea silvatica van der Werff
- Persea sphaerocarpa (H.J.P.Winkl.) Kosterm.
- Persea splendens Meisn.
- Persea sprucei Kosterm.
- Persea standleyi C.K.Allen
- Persea stricta Mez
- Persea subcordata (Ruiz & Pav.) Nees
- Persea trollii O.C.Schmidt
- Persea urbaniana Mez
- Persea vanderwerffii Doweld
- Persea venosa Nees & Mart.
- Persea veraguasensis Seem.
- Persea vesticula Standl. & Steyerm.
- Persea wangchiana (Chun) Kosterm.
- Persea weberbaueri Mez
- Persea willdenovii Kosterm.

=== Formerly placed here ===
- Machilus macranthus Nees (as Persea macrantha (Nees) Kosterm.)
- Tamala borbonia (L.) Raf. (as Persea borbonia (L.) Spreng.)
- Tamala palustris Raf. (as Persea palustris (Raf.) Sarg.)
