= Nonguén National Park =

National park in Chile

- IUCN category IV (habitat/species management area)
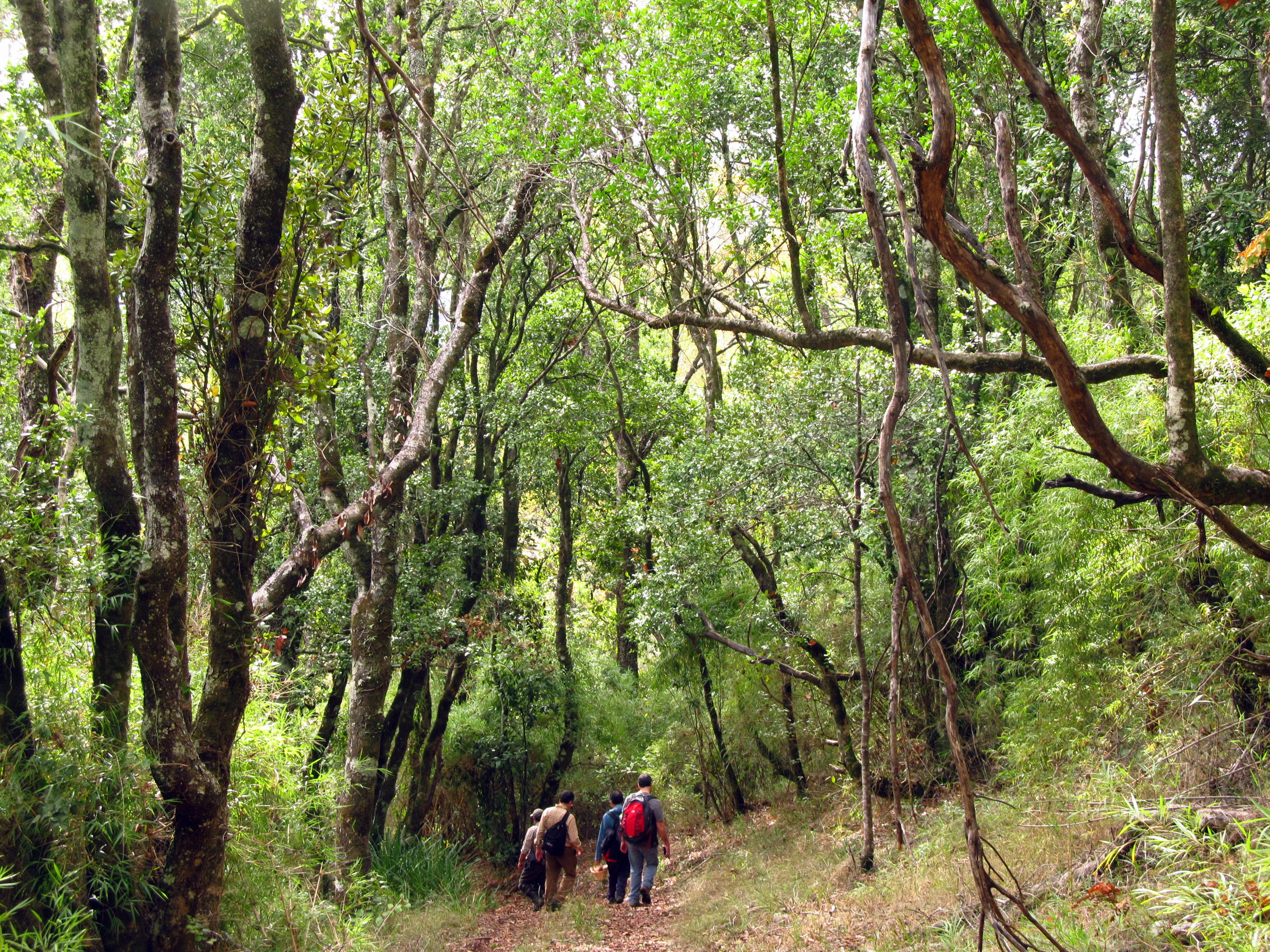
- Interactive map of Nonguén National Park
- Location: Bío Bío Region, Chile
- Nearest city: Concepción
- Coordinates: 36°53′34″S 72°58′38″W
- Area: 30.37 km^{2} (11.73 sq mi)
- Designation: National Park
- Designated: 2021
- Governing body: Corporación Nacional Forestal (CONAF)

Nonguén National Park is a protected area in central Chile. It is located in Bío Bío Region, southeast of the city of Concepción. It was designated a national reserve in 2010, and re-designated a national park in 2021. It protects an area of 30.37 km^{2}.

== Flora and fauna ==
The park conserves one of the largest remnants (2.135 ha) of the Concepción deciduous forest (bosque caducifolio de Concepción), a temperate forest plant community limited to the Chilean Coast Range of Biobío Region. The broadleaf deciduous tree Nothofagus obliqua is predominant, along with sclerophyllous evergreen trees characteristic of the forests of Mediterranean-climate Chile such as Cryptocarya alba, Lithraea caustica, and Persea lingue, and laurel-leaved evergreen trees characteristic of the humid Valdivian forests like Gevuina avellana, Aextoxicon punctatum, and Weinmannia trichosperma. Ravines are characterized by moisture-loving evergreens like Nothofagus dombeyi, Laurelia sempervirens, Podocarpus salignus, and Amomyrtus luma.

The park is home to several plants of conservation concern, including two Endangered species, the tree Pitavia punctata and the shrub Berberis negeriana, and several near-threatened and vulnerable species, including Adiantum chilense, Blechnum hastatum, Citronella mucronata, Lophosoria quadripinnata, Clinopodium multiflorum, Asplenium dareoides, Parablechnum cordatum, Persea lingue, and Hypolepis poeppigii.

68 bird species have been recorded in the park, including the Chilean pigeon (Patagioenas araucana), bicolored hawk (Accipiter bicolor), white-throated hawk, (Buteo albigula), and stripe-backed bittern (Ixobrychus involucris).

Native reptiles include Pristidactylus torquatus, Galvarinus chilensis, Philodryas chamissonis, Liolaemus cyanogaster, Liolaemus chiliensis, Liolaemus lemniscatus, Liolaemus pictus, and Liolaemus tenuis. Native amphibians include Caudiverbera caudiverbera, Eupsophus roseus, Batrachyla taeniata, Pleurodema thaul, and Batrachyla leptopus.
