= Painted tree iguana =

Painted tree iguana is a common name for two species of iguana:

- Liolaemus pictus
- Liolaemus septentrionalis
