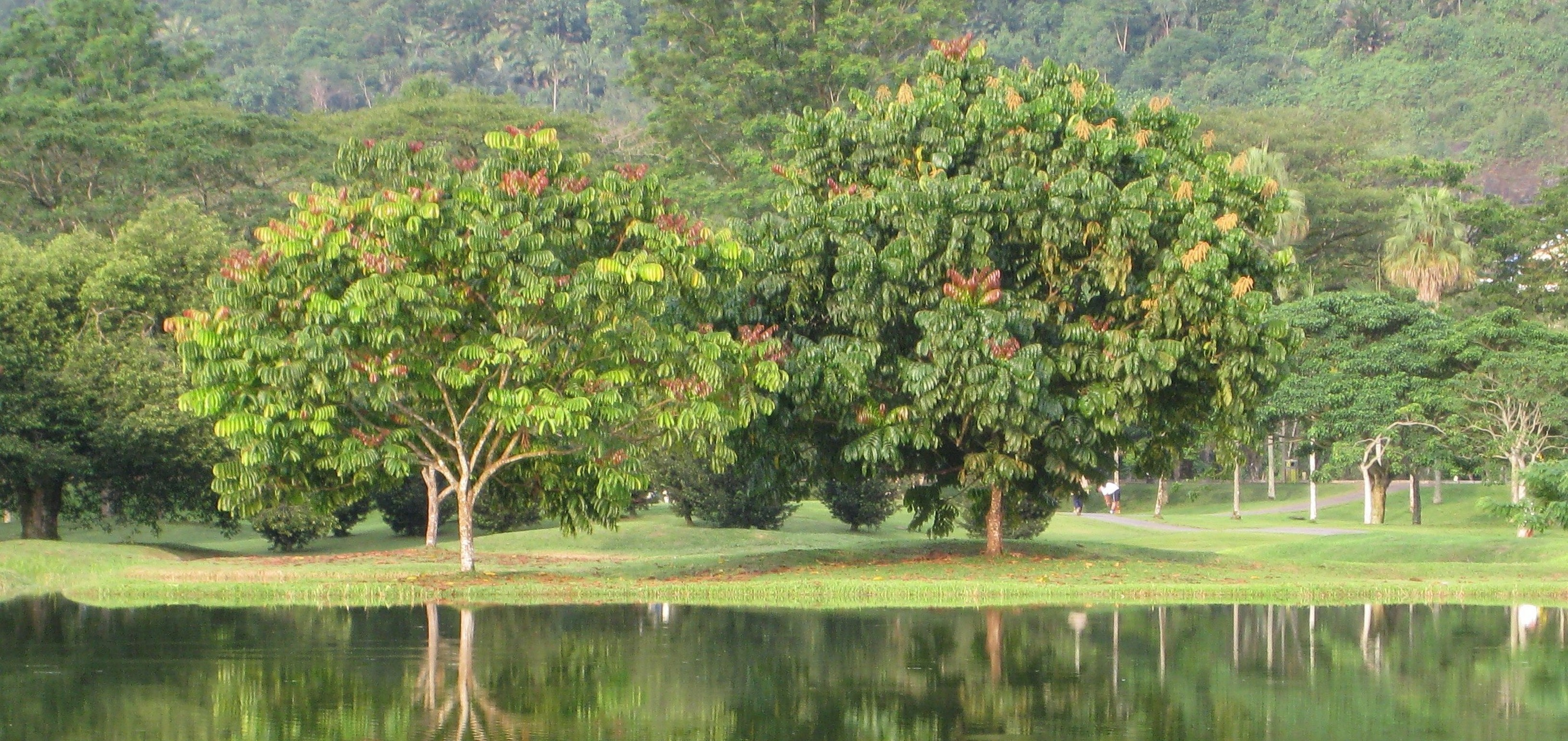
- Trees with the white bark in Taiping (Malaysia)

Scientific classification
- Kingdom: Plantae
- Clade: Tracheophytes
- Clade: Angiosperms
- Clade: Magnoliids
- Order: Laurales
- Family: Lauraceae
- Genus: Dehaasia; Blume

Species
- see text

Synonyms
- Cyanodaphne Blume; Haasia Blume

= Dehaasia =

Genus of flowering plants

Dehaasia is a genus of evergreen or deciduous trees or shrubs belonging to the laurel family, Lauraceae, with 42 species native to continental Asia, from India to China, Borneo, New Guinea, and Indonesia.

They are bisexual shrubs or trees of medium size up to 5 m tall. in tropical montane forest, lowland rainforest, subtropical coastal lowland rainforest, cloud forest, and laurel forest. Species are found in Cambodia, China, Indonesia, Laos, Malaysia, Myanmar, the Philippines, Thailand, and Vietnam, with the center of diversity in west Malaysia; three species occur in China, two endemic. Alseodaphne, Dehaasia and Nothaphoebe are, morphologically, three closely related but different genera in a subgroup near to genus Persea.

The leaves are bright green to dark green, alternate, oblong to lanceolate to almost elliptical, acuminate, and slightly cut at the base. They are leathery in texture, glossy on both sides, dark green on the upper face more intense, sometimes with small blisters on the underside.

The trunk is rough and irregular, covered usually with a paper bark, whitish or gray, smooth and easy to peel, with the xylem yellow. Some species with multiple stems or trunks are strongly branched from the base. The young branches are slender, angular, smoothly integumented, with visible signs of scars and sometimes reddish areas of recent growth. The branchlets are yellow-white at first, but a little gray later, thin, glabrous, warty, lenticellated with distinctive leaf scars, the young more or less angled.

The leaves are grouped at the tip of the twigs. The inflorescences form in the axils, are generally thin with many bracts and few flowers, usually upright and branched at right angles. Dehaasia species have bisexual flowers, i.e. they have both male and female organs.

The fruit are ovoid or sometimes nearly spherical, with a fleshy exocarp. The fruit stalk is usually scarlet, sometimes yellow or green. Seed dispersal of Dehaasia species is by vertebrates mostly. They are eaten by fruit-eating bats and birds (columbiformes) and several insects such as ants.

== Species ==
As of September 2026, Plants of the World Online accepts 42 species:

- Dehaasia acuminata Koord. & Valeton
- Dehaasia annamensis Kosterm.
- Dehaasia arunachalensis M.Gangop.
- Dehaasia assamica Kosterm.
- Dehaasia bandaharensis Fijrid.
- Dehaasia brachybotrys (Merr.) Kosterm.
- Dehaasia caesia Blume
- Dehaasia cairocan (S.Vidal) C.K.Allen
- Dehaasia candolleana (Meisn.) Kosterm.
- Dehaasia celebica Kosterm.
- Dehaasia corynantha Kosterm.
- Dehaasia cuneata (Blume) Blume
- Dehaasia elliptica Ridl.
- Dehaasia ferruginea (H.Liu) de Kok
- Dehaasia firma Blume
- Dehaasia gigantocarpa Kosterm.
- Dehaasia hainanensis Kosterm.
- Dehaasia hirsuta Kosterm.
- Dehaasia incrassata (Jack) Nees
- Dehaasia kerrii Kosterm.
- Dehaasia kurzii King ex Hook.f.
- Dehaasia lancifolia Ridl.
- Dehaasia longipedicellata (Ridl.) Kosterm.
- Dehaasia longipetiolata Kosterm.
- Dehaasia membranacea Kosterm.
- Dehaasia palembanica Kosterm.
- Dehaasia paradoxa Blume
- Dehaasia pauciflora Blume
- Dehaasia pilosa Fijrid.
- Dehaasia poilanei H.Liu
- Dehaasia pugerensis Koord. & Valeton
- Dehaasia rangamattiensis M.Gangop.
- Dehaasia spectabilis Miq.
- Dehaasia subcaesia Miq.
- Dehaasia suborbicularis Lecomte
- Dehaasia sumatrana Kosterm.
- Dehaasia sumbaensis Kosterm.
- Dehaasia teijsmannii Kosterm.
- Dehaasia titanophylla (Airy Shaw) Kosterm.
- Dehaasia tomentosa (Blume) Kosterm.
- Dehaasia turfosa Kosterm.
- Dehaasia velutinosa Kosterm.
