= Persea pyrifolia =

Persea pyrifolia is a taxon synonym for two species of trees in family Lauraceae:

- Persea pyrifolia Nees & Mart., synonym of Persea willdenovii Kosterm.
- Persea pyrifolia (D.Don) Spreng., synonym of Cinnamomum pyrifolium D.Don
