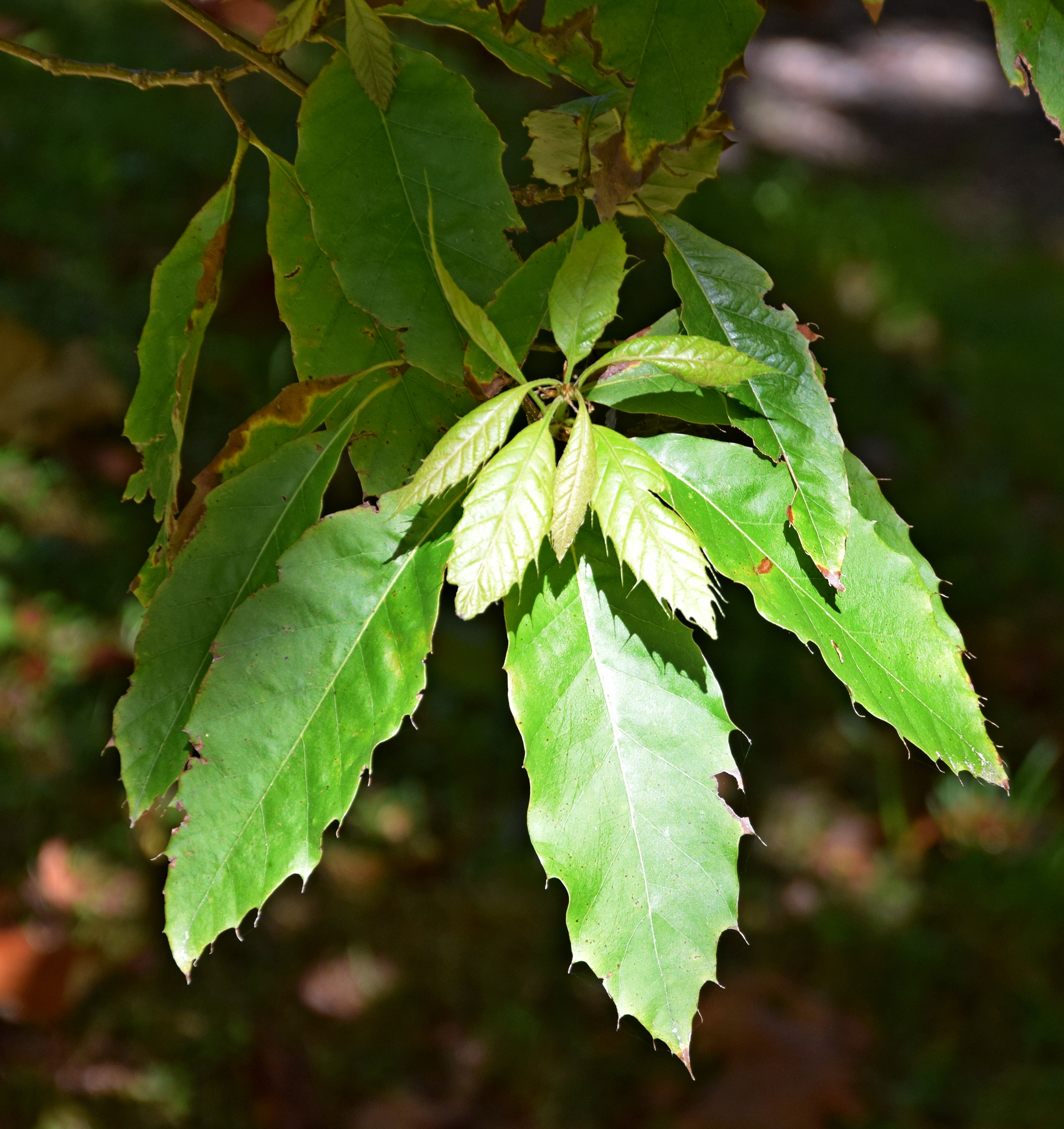

Conservation status
- Least Concern (IUCN 3.1)

Scientific classification
- Kingdom: Plantae
- Clade: Embryophytes
- Clade: Tracheophytes
- Clade: Spermatophytes
- Clade: Angiosperms
- Clade: Eudicots
- Clade: Rosids
- Order: Fagales
- Family: Fagaceae
- Genus: Quercus
- Subgenus: Quercus subg. Quercus
- Section: Quercus sect. Lobatae
- Species: Q. xalapensis

Binomial name
- Quercus xalapensis Bonpl.

Synonyms
- List: Quercus cupreata Trel. & C.H.Müll.; Quercus cupreata f. brachystachys C.H.Mull.; Quercus cupreata f. serrata Trel. & C.H.Müll.; Quercus huitamalcana Trel.; Quercus serra Liebm. 1854 not Unger 1845; Quercus sierramadrensis C.H.Mull.; Quercus tenuiloba C.H.Mull.; Quercus tenuiloba f. gracilis C.H.Mull.; Quercus tenuiloba f. hirsuta C.H.Mull.; Quercus vexans Trel.; Quercus xalapensis f. jalapae Trel.; Quercus xalapensis f. surculina Trel.

= Quercus xalapensis =

Species of plant

Quercus xalapensis, or Xalapa oak, is a species of oak in the red oak group (Quercus section Lobatae). It is native to the mountains of eastern and southern Mexico, as well as Guatemala, Honduras, and Nicaragua in northern Central America.

== Description ==
Quercus xalapensis is a large tree with a trunk 40–80 centimetres (16–31 inches) in diameter. The leaves are lance-shaped, up to 10 centimetres (4 inches) long, with numerous teeth along the edge, each tooth tapering to a long, thin point.

== Range and habitat ==
Quercus xalapensis is native to the mountains of eastern and southern Mexico and northern Central America. Its range includes the Sierra Madre Oriental, the Sierra Madre de Oaxaca and eastern Sierra Madre del Sur, the Sierra de los Tuxtlas, and the Chiapas Highlands and Sierra Madre de Chiapas, as well as the Chortis Highlands of Honduras and Nicaragua.

The species grows in oak forest, Abies forest, and cloud forest between 1,070 and 2,000 meters elevation. It is found on shallow soils and sandstone-derived soils with an acid pH. It is shade-intolerant, and prefers relatively open areas of the forest. Young trees grow in forest clearings and can be planted in abandoned pastures. Associated plants include ephipytic orchids and bromeliads and the trees Carya ovata, Persea liebmannii, Quercus muehlenbergii, Quercus polymorpha, and Pinus pseudostrobus.
