= Persea bullata =

Conservation status
- Vulnerable (IUCN 3.1)

Scientific classification
- Kingdom: Plantae
- Clade: Tracheophytes
- Clade: Angiosperms
- Clade: Magnoliids
- Order: Laurales
- Family: Lauraceae
- Genus: Persea
- Species: P. bullata

Binomial name
- Persea bullata L.E.Kopp

Species of flowering plant

Persea bullata is a species of flowering plant in the family Lauraceae. It is endemic to Ecuador. Its natural habitat is subtropical or tropical moist montane forests.
