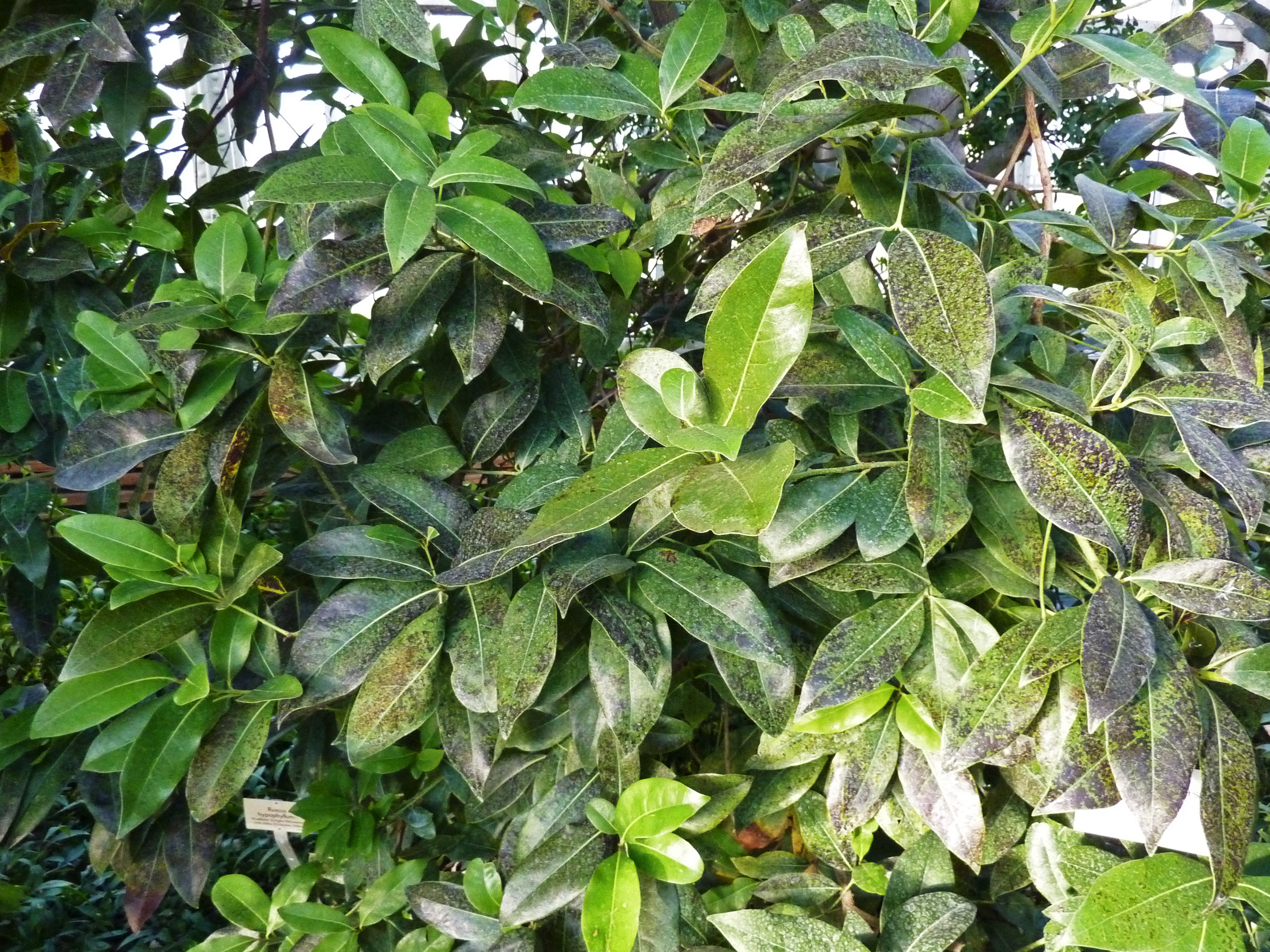

Conservation status
- Least Concern (IUCN 3.1)

Scientific classification
- Kingdom: Plantae
- Clade: Tracheophytes
- Clade: Angiosperms
- Clade: Magnoliids
- Order: Laurales
- Family: Lauraceae
- Genus: Persea
- Species: P. barbujana

Binomial name
- Persea barbujana (Cav.) Mabb. & Nieto Fel.

Synonyms
- Synonymy: Apollonias barbujana (Cav.) A.Braun; Apollonias canariensis (Willd.) Nees; Apollonias canariensis var. Meisn.; Laurus barbujana Cav. (1801) (basionym; Laurus barbusana Lowe; Laurus barbusano Hochst. ex Webb & Berthel.; Laurus borbonia Meisn.; Laurus canariensis Willd.; Laurus carolinensis Meisn.; Laurus foetens Brouss. ex Meisn.; Laurus nitida Masson ex Meisn.; Laurus reticulata Poir.; Laurus tomentosa Meisn.; Persea canariensis (Willd.) Spreng.; Phoebe barbujana (Cav.) Webb & Berthel.

= Persea barbujana =

Species of flowering plant

Persea barbujana, the Canary laurel or barbusano, is a species of tree in the laurel family, Lauraceae. It is endemic to the Macaronesian islands of Madeira (incl. Porto Santo) and the Canary Islands. It is often placed as the sole species in genus Apollonias. Molecular phylogenic analyses found that the species is nested within the genus Persea, which also includes the Macaronesian endemic Persea indica.

The La Gomera subspecies is distinct and endangered.

== Gallery ==
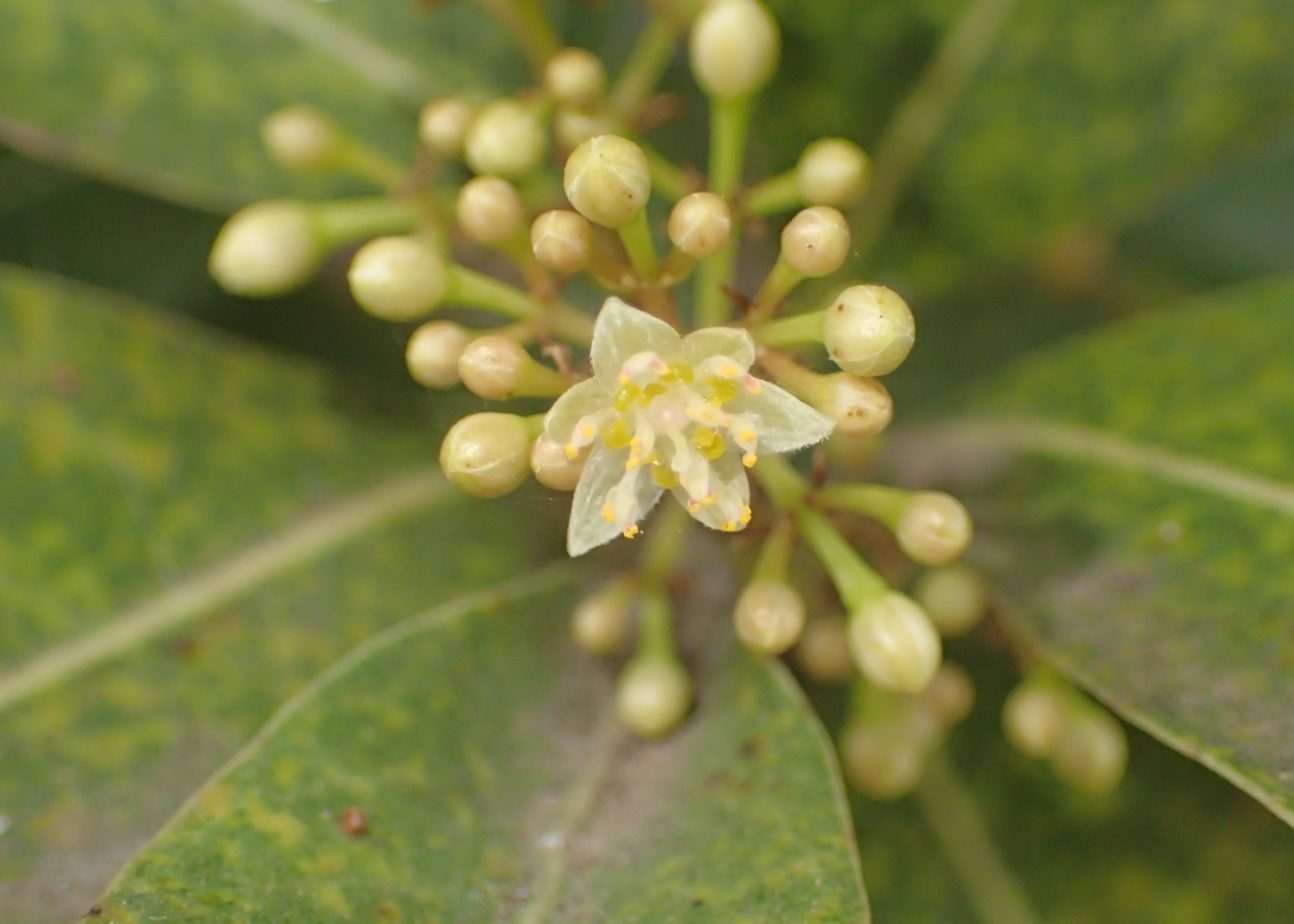
Flowers

Branch

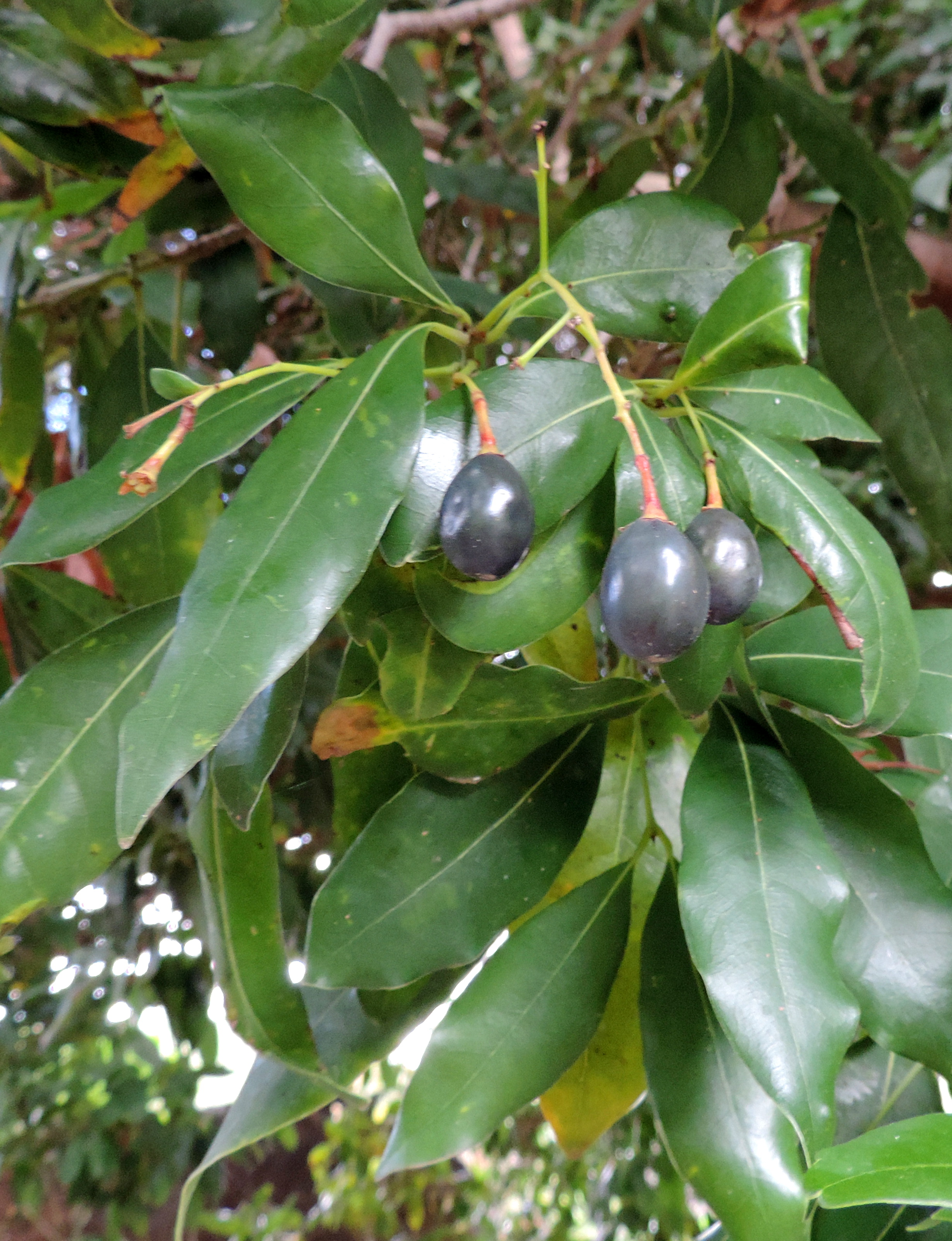
Fruits

Trunk

Crown
