= Persea ruizii =

Conservation status
- Least Concern (IUCN 3.1)

Scientific classification
- Kingdom: Plantae
- Clade: Tracheophytes
- Clade: Angiosperms
- Clade: Magnoliids
- Order: Laurales
- Family: Lauraceae
- Genus: Persea
- Species: P. ruizii

Binomial name
- Persea ruizii J.F.Macbr.

Synonyms
- Laurus ferruginea Ruiz & Pav.; Mutisiopersea ruizii (J.F.Macbr.) Kosterm.; Persea ferruginea (Ruiz & Pav.) Mez

Species of tree

Persea ruizii is a species of flowering plant in the family Lauraceae. It is a tree native to Bolivia, Peru, and northwestern Venezuela.

The species was described by James Francis Macbride in 1931.
