= Nothaphoebe kingiana =

Conservation status
- Least Concern (IUCN 3.1)

Scientific classification
- Kingdom: Plantae
- Clade: Tracheophytes
- Clade: Angiosperms
- Clade: Magnoliids
- Order: Laurales
- Family: Lauraceae
- Genus: Nothaphoebe
- Species: N. kingiana

Binomial name
- Nothaphoebe kingiana Gamble

Species of flowering plant

Nothaphoebe kingiana is a species of plant in the family Lauraceae. It is native to Peninsular Malaysia and Borneo.
