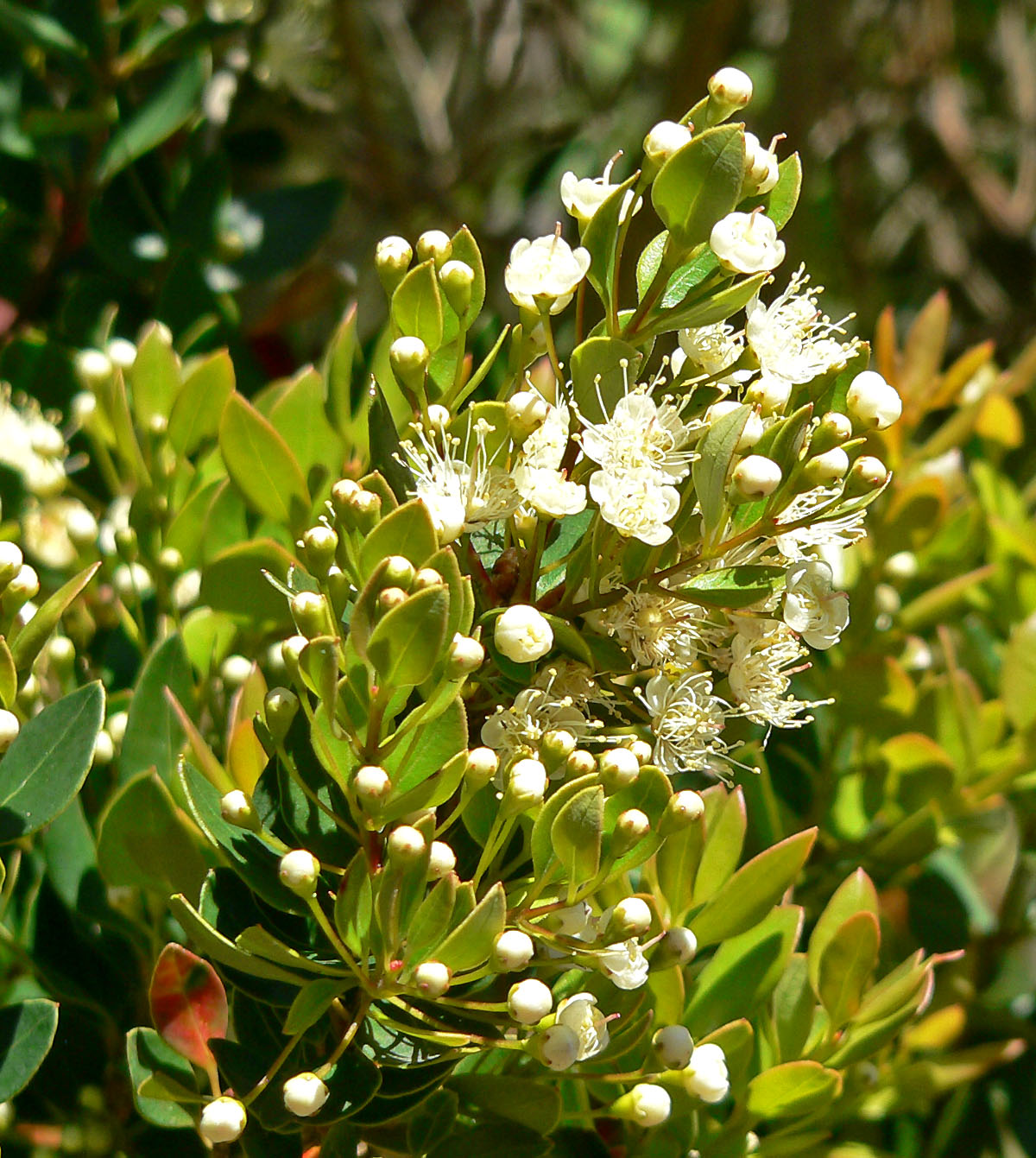
- Amomyrtus meli

Scientific classification
- Kingdom: Plantae
- Clade: Embryophytes
- Clade: Tracheophytes
- Clade: Spermatophytes
- Clade: Angiosperms
- Clade: Eudicots
- Clade: Rosids
- Order: Myrtales
- Family: Myrtaceae
- Subfamily: Myrtoideae
- Tribe: Myrteae
- Genus: Amomyrtus (Burret) D.Legrand & Kausel

= Amomyrtus =

Genus of flowering plants in the myrtle family

Amomyrtus is a genus of flowering plants in the myrtle family, Myrtaceae described as a genus in 1948. It is native to temperate southern South America, where it is distributed in Chile and Argentina.

These plants produce large, white flowers with abundant pollen and fleshy black fruits containing one to three seeds. They are self-compatible.

The name Amomyrtus comes from the Greek Amos, very fragrant; and Myrtus from family's name.

== Species ==
Species

Image	Scientific name	Description	Distribution
	Amomyrtus luma (Molina) D.Legrand & Kausel,	a shrub or tree	the humid forests of Chile and Argentina
	Amomyrtus meli (Phil.) D.Legrand & Kausel,	a large tree	the rainforests of Chile
