= Persea obtusifolia =

Conservation status
- Near Threatened (IUCN 3.1)

Scientific classification
- Kingdom: Plantae
- Clade: Tracheophytes
- Clade: Angiosperms
- Clade: Magnoliids
- Order: Laurales
- Family: Lauraceae
- Genus: Persea
- Species: P. obtusifolia

Binomial name
- Persea obtusifolia L.E.Kopp

Species of flowering plant

Persea obtusifolia is a species of flowering plant in the family Lauraceae. It is a shrub or tree native to Costa Rica and Panama.
