= Nothaphoebe pahangensis =

Conservation status
- Conservation Dependent (IUCN 2.3)

Scientific classification
- Kingdom: Plantae
- Clade: Tracheophytes
- Clade: Angiosperms
- Clade: Magnoliids
- Order: Laurales
- Family: Lauraceae
- Genus: Nothaphoebe
- Species: N. pahangensis

Binomial name
- Nothaphoebe pahangensis Kosterm.

Species of tree

Nothaphoebe pahangensis is a species of plant in the family Lauraceae. It is a tree endemic to Peninsular Malaysia.
