= Nothaphoebe umbelliflora =

Conservation status
- Least Concern (IUCN 3.1)

Scientific classification
- Kingdom: Plantae
- Clade: Tracheophytes
- Clade: Angiosperms
- Clade: Magnoliids
- Order: Laurales
- Family: Lauraceae
- Genus: Nothaphoebe
- Species: N. umbelliflora

Binomial name
- Nothaphoebe umbelliflora (Blume) Blume

Synonyms
- Aiouea malabonga Blanco; Alseodaphne malabonga (Blanco) Kosterm.; Alseodaphne umbelliflora (Blume) Hook.f.; Dehaasia nitida Meisn.; Euphoebe umbelliflora Blume ex Meisn.; Mastixia cuneata Blume; Nothaphoebe malabonga (Blanco) Merr.; Ocotea umbelliflora Blume; Phoebe umbelliflora (Blume) Nees

Species of tree

Nothaphoebe umbelliflora is an evergreen tropical tree in the family Lauraceae. Its common name in English is the bong tree. It is also called the yang bong tree (Thai), or gemor.

== Taxonomy ==
The species was first described as Ocotea umbelliflora by Carl Ludwig Blume in 1826. In 1851 Blume placed the species in genus Nothaphoebe as N. umbelliflora. Blume spent much of his professional life studying the flora of the Dutch East Indies.

The Latin binomial was created from Greek nothos, meaning false; phoebe, referring to the close resemblance to the genus Phoebe; and Latin umbellatus, referring to the tree's flowers that form an umbel, i.e., the flower stalks all arise from the same point.

== Range and habitat ==
Its natural distribution includes Peninsular Malaysia, Thailand, Borneo, Sumatra, Bangka Island, Java, the Philippines, and Palawan. Its distribution is approximately the same as the Nepenthes Mirabilis (tropical pitcher plant)

Its habitat is primary and secondary rainforests, including lowland and upland mixed dipterocarp and riparian evergreen forests, from sea level to 1200 meters elevation.

== Uses and economic considerations ==
Bark from the bong tree contains gum, a useful sticking agent, and aromatic oils. Pulverized bark is used to make incense sticks for temples in South and Southeast Asia. It is also an ingredient of mosquito coils and glue for carton and particleboard. When mixed with soil, the bark can be molded into statues and household items.

The once-abundant bong tree is now on the endangered list in Laos. Farmers in the mountainous Samouay district have traditionally used the slash-and-burn method to clear forest for rice production, then moving on to new tracts of land when the soil is exhausted. For this reason, mature trees can no longer be found there. When it is not being sustainably cultivated, the entire tree is cut down and then the bark is stripped off.

In 2008, the Sustainable Natural Resource Management and Productivity Enhancement Project, funded by IFAD IFAD (International Fund for Agricultural Development), began a project to create commercial bong tree nurseries in the Samouay and Taoye districts, plant one-hectare plots of bong trees, and support sustainable land-use planning. The cultivation of bong has created an additional source of income for farmers and minimized carbon emissions from slash-and-burn land use.

The project has helped farmers achieve better security through permanent land certificates and diversifying crops, so that they have a crop to sell as well as permanent homes, and are not dependent on subsistence farming alone. Cultivated bong trees, when farmers are properly harvesting the bark, can yield for up to 50 years.

The wood is also used locally for house building.

== Processing of bong tree bark ==
Bark is sun dried by the farmers and sold to factories. At the factory, the bark is ground up and mixed with sawdust and perfumed talc to make a mix called kobuac. Bamboo sticks are rolled in this compound and dried to produce the finished incense, or joss, sticks.
