= Persea brenesii =

Conservation status
- Vulnerable (IUCN 3.1)

Scientific classification
- Kingdom: Plantae
- Clade: Tracheophytes
- Clade: Angiosperms
- Clade: Magnoliids
- Order: Laurales
- Family: Lauraceae
- Genus: Persea
- Species: P. brenesii

Binomial name
- Persea brenesii Standl.

Species of flowering plant

Persea brenesii is a species of flowering plant in the family Lauraceae. It is a tree endemic to Costa Rica.
