= Persea julianae =

Conservation status
- Data Deficient (IUCN 3.1)

Scientific classification
- Kingdom: Plantae
- Clade: Tracheophytes
- Clade: Angiosperms
- Clade: Magnoliids
- Order: Laurales
- Family: Lauraceae
- Genus: Persea
- Species: P. julianae

Binomial name
- Persea julianae van der Werff

Species of flowering plant

Persea julianae is a species of plant in the family Lauraceae. It is a tree endemic to Suriname.
