= Persea glabra =

Conservation status
- Endangered (IUCN 3.1)

Scientific classification
- Kingdom: Plantae
- Clade: Tracheophytes
- Clade: Angiosperms
- Clade: Magnoliids
- Order: Laurales
- Family: Lauraceae
- Genus: Persea
- Species: P. glabra

Binomial name
- Persea glabra van der Werff

Species of flowering plant

Persea glabra is a species of flowering plant in the family Lauraceae. It is a tree endemic to northeastern Brazil.
