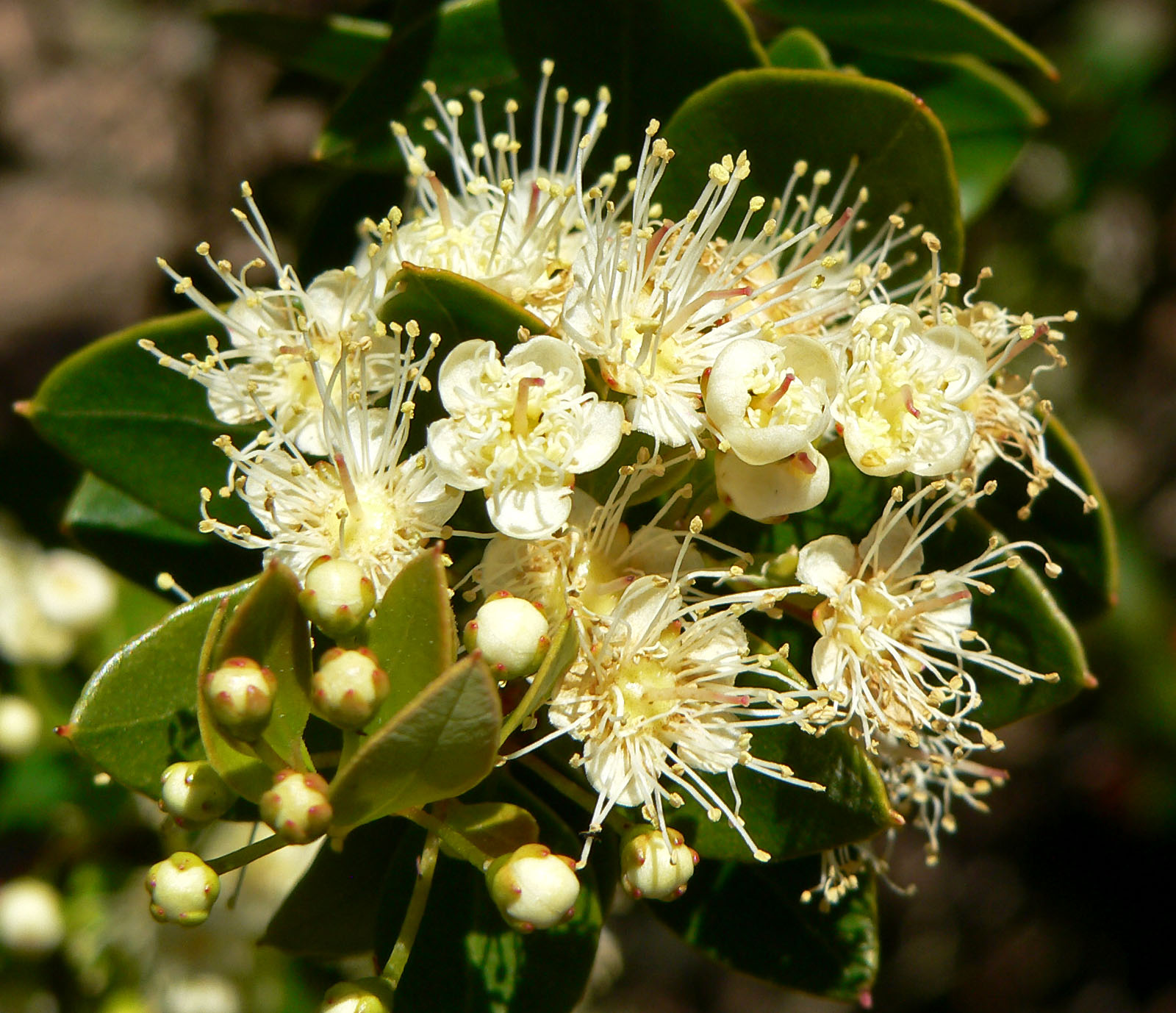

Conservation status
- Least Concern (IUCN 3.1)

Scientific classification
- Kingdom: Plantae
- Clade: Tracheophytes
- Clade: Angiosperms
- Clade: Eudicots
- Clade: Rosids
- Order: Myrtales
- Family: Myrtaceae
- Genus: Amomyrtus
- Species: A. meli

Binomial name
- Amomyrtus meli (Phil.) D.Legrand & Kausel

= Amomyrtus meli =

Meli

Species of plant

Amomyrtus meli, known as meli, is a species of tree in the family Myrtaceae. It is endemic to Chile and grows from Arauco to Chiloe (37 to 42°S). It grows mostly on moist and shaded sites.

== Description ==
It is an evergreen tree that measures up to 20 m (65 ft) tall and up to 60 cm (23 in) in diameter, with smooth, decorticant bark of reddish-whitish color. The leaves are opposite, oval, lanceolate or elliptical with acute apex which ends in a mucro up to 1 mm long. The leaves are 2–5 long and 0.7–2.5 cm wide, the petioles are 2–4 mm long. Newly shoots are glabrous what make it different from Amomyrtus luma, species to which it resembles very much. The flowers are hermaphrodite, 5 fused sepals and 5 free white petals about 3–4 mm long. The stamens are numerous 40–80 and 5–7 mm long. The fruit is a black purplish-black berry, 5–8 mm in diameter, generally with 3 seeds about 3–4.5 mm.

== Etymology ==
The name Amomyrtus from the Greek Amos, very fragrant; Myrtus is the family's name and Meli is the indigenous mapuche name of the tree.

== Taxonomy ==
Amomyrtus meli was first described by Rodolfo Amando Philippi in 1856, and in 1947 by D.Legrand & Kausel.

== Cultivation and uses ==
The wood is extremely hard and resistant and that is why it is used for elaborating tool handles; it is also planted as an ornamental tree because it blooms abundantly and is very fragrant. Its flowers are important for honey production.
