= Nothaphoebe condensa =

Conservation status
- Vulnerable (IUCN 3.1)

Scientific classification
- Kingdom: Plantae
- Clade: Tracheophytes
- Clade: Angiosperms
- Clade: Magnoliids
- Order: Laurales
- Family: Lauraceae
- Genus: Nothaphoebe
- Species: N. condensa

Binomial name
- Nothaphoebe condensa Ridley

Species of flowering plant

Nothaphoebe condensa is a species of plant in the family Lauraceae. It is endemic to Peninsular Malaysia.
