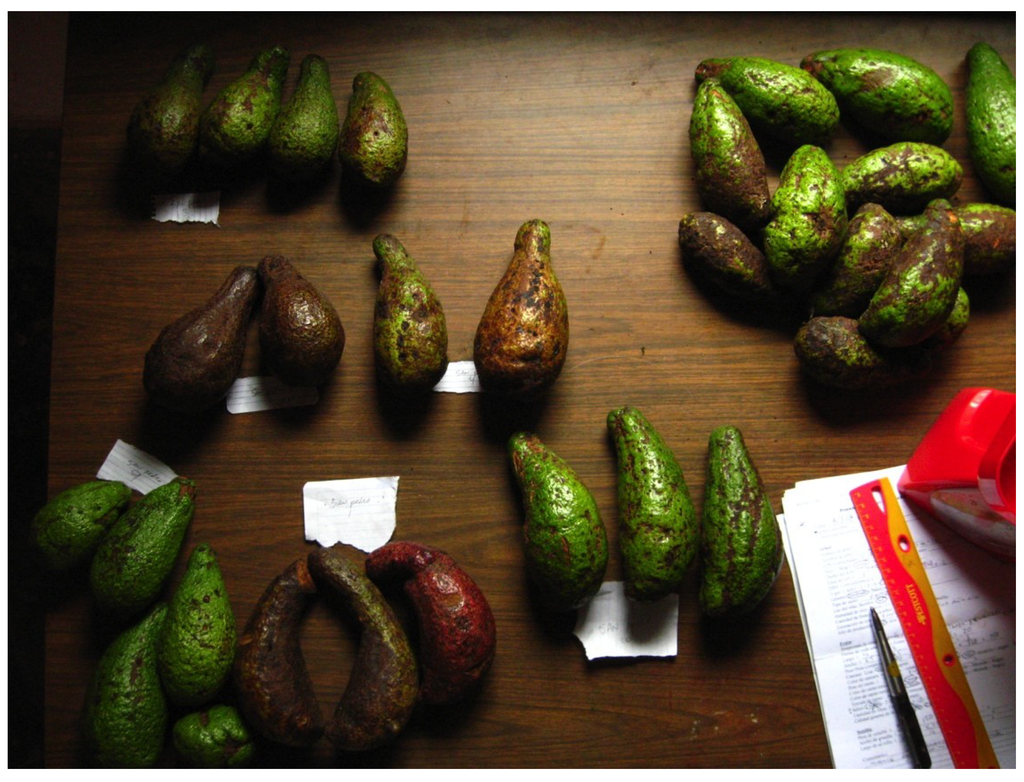

Conservation status
- Endangered (IUCN 3.1)

Scientific classification
- Kingdom: Plantae
- Clade: Tracheophytes
- Clade: Angiosperms
- Clade: Magnoliids
- Order: Laurales
- Family: Lauraceae
- Genus: Persea
- Species: P. schiedeana

Binomial name
- Persea schiedeana Nees

Synonyms
- Persea gratissima var. schiedeana (Nees) Meisn.; Persea pittieri Mez

= Persea schiedeana =

Species of tree

Persea schiedeana, the coyo, is an endangered, evergreen tree in the laurel family (Lauraceae), native to tropical forests of northeastern and southern Mexico, Central America, and Colombia. Its edible fruit resembles that of the avocado (Persea americana), a related tree in the genus Persea. Other common names include aguacate de montaña, aguacatón, chinini, chupte and yas.

Coyo is native to eastern and southern Mexico, parts of Central America, and Colombia. It occurs at elevations up to 2800 meters in lowlands and montane tropical forests. It is cultivated for fruit and used as graft stock for common avocado.

The tree grows to about 20 m high, occasionally reaching 50 m. Young branches are very hairy. The leaves are deciduous and the flowers are light greenish-yellow, with the stamens turning red with age. The fruit, closely resembling that of the avocado, is generally pear-shaped, with a thick, green, leathery skin. The flesh is oily with a milky juice and tastes like an avocado or coconut. The pear-shaped fruit is easily mistaken for an avocado. However, it contains a much larger central seed. The flesh has stone cells and a gritty texture that is generally considered unfavourable for edible consumption, despite its appealing taste. The cotyledons, unlike those of the avocado, are pink internally.

The seeds of the tree are dispersed by wild animals that eat the fruit, including tepezcuintle (Cuniculus paca), tejón coati (Nasua narica) and agoutis (Dasyprocta sp.).

This species is considered to be endangered due to loss of habitat as forests are cleared for agriculture.

== Phylogenetics ==
Coyo is very closely related to avocado (Persea americana) and may be its closest living relative. The Open Tree of Life suggests the following phylogenetic relationships:

- - D. hainanensis — lian gui
  - - Alseodaphnopsis (6 species)
    - M. salicina — liu ye run nan
  - - P. americana — avocado
    - Machilus schiedeana — coyo
