= Persea nudigemma =

Conservation status
- Vulnerable (IUCN 3.1)

Scientific classification
- Kingdom: Plantae
- Clade: Tracheophytes
- Clade: Angiosperms
- Clade: Magnoliids
- Order: Laurales
- Family: Lauraceae
- Genus: Persea
- Species: P. nudigemma

Binomial name
- Persea nudigemma van der Werff

Species of flowering plant

Persea nudigemma is a species of plant in the family Lauraceae, commonly known as laurel. It is a flowering, leafy plant endemic to subtropical or tropical moist montane forests in Ecuador.
