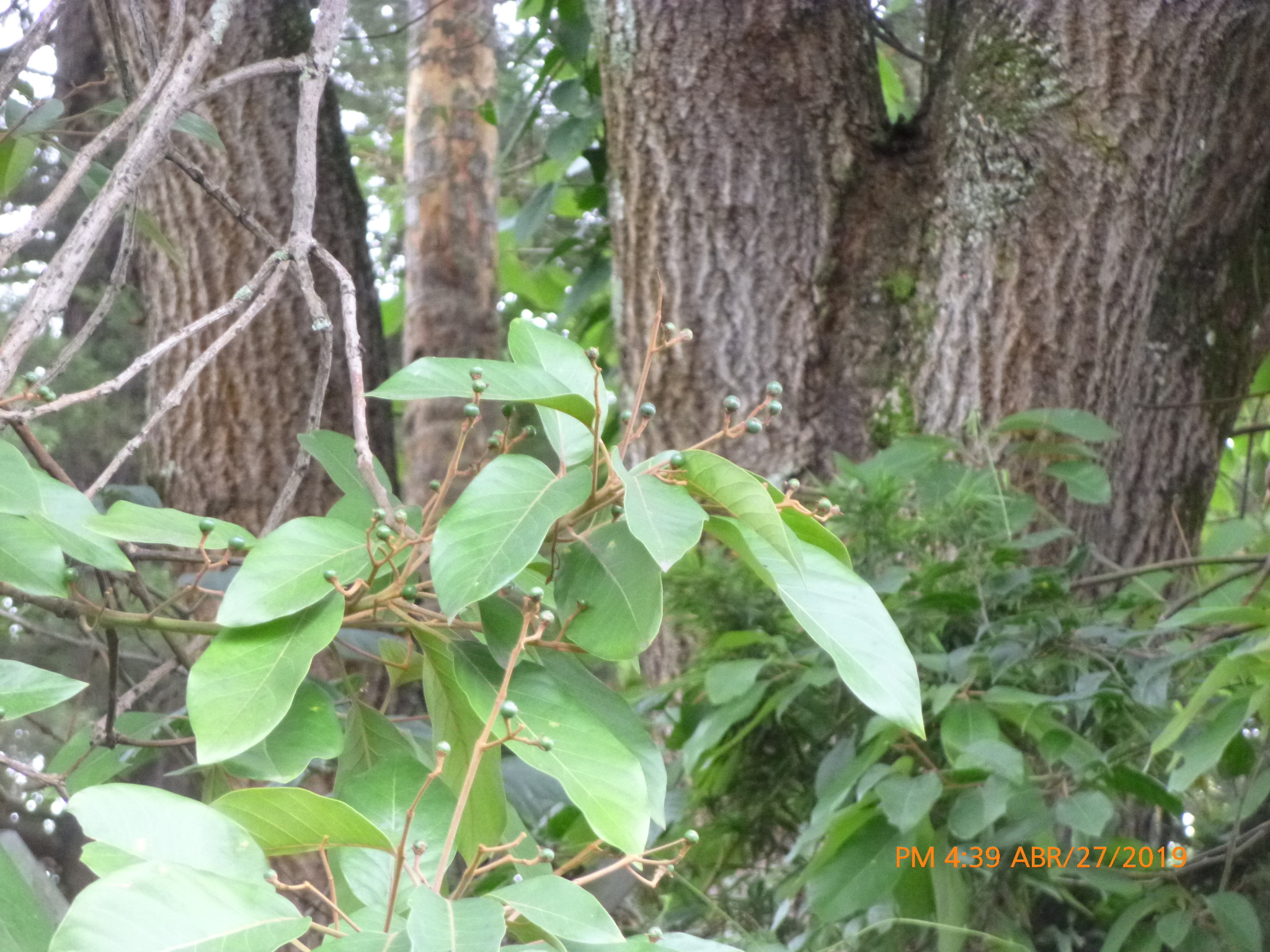

Conservation status
- Least Concern (IUCN 3.1)

Scientific classification
- Kingdom: Plantae
- Clade: Tracheophytes
- Clade: Angiosperms
- Clade: Magnoliids
- Order: Laurales
- Family: Lauraceae
- Genus: Persea
- Species: P. caerulea

Binomial name
- Persea caerulea (Ruiz & Pav.) Mez

Synonyms
- Laurus caerulea Ruiz & Pav.; Persea laevigata var. caerulea (Ruiz & Pav.) Meisn.; Laurus coerulea Ruiz & Pav. ex Meisn.; Laurus laevigata Willd. ex Meisn.; Laurus pruinosa Willd. ex Nees; Laurus pyrifolia Willd. ex Nees; Laurus viburnoides Willd. ex Nees; Persea laevigata Kunth; Persea lignitepala Lasser; Persea petiolaris Kunth; Persea skutchii C.K.Allen

= Persea caerulea =

Species of tree

Persea caerulea is a species of evergreen tree in the laurel family, Lauraceae. It is native to tropical Central and South America, ranging from El Salvador and Honduras through Nicaragua, Costa Rica, and Panama to Colombia, Venezuela, Ecuador, Peru, and Bolivia.
