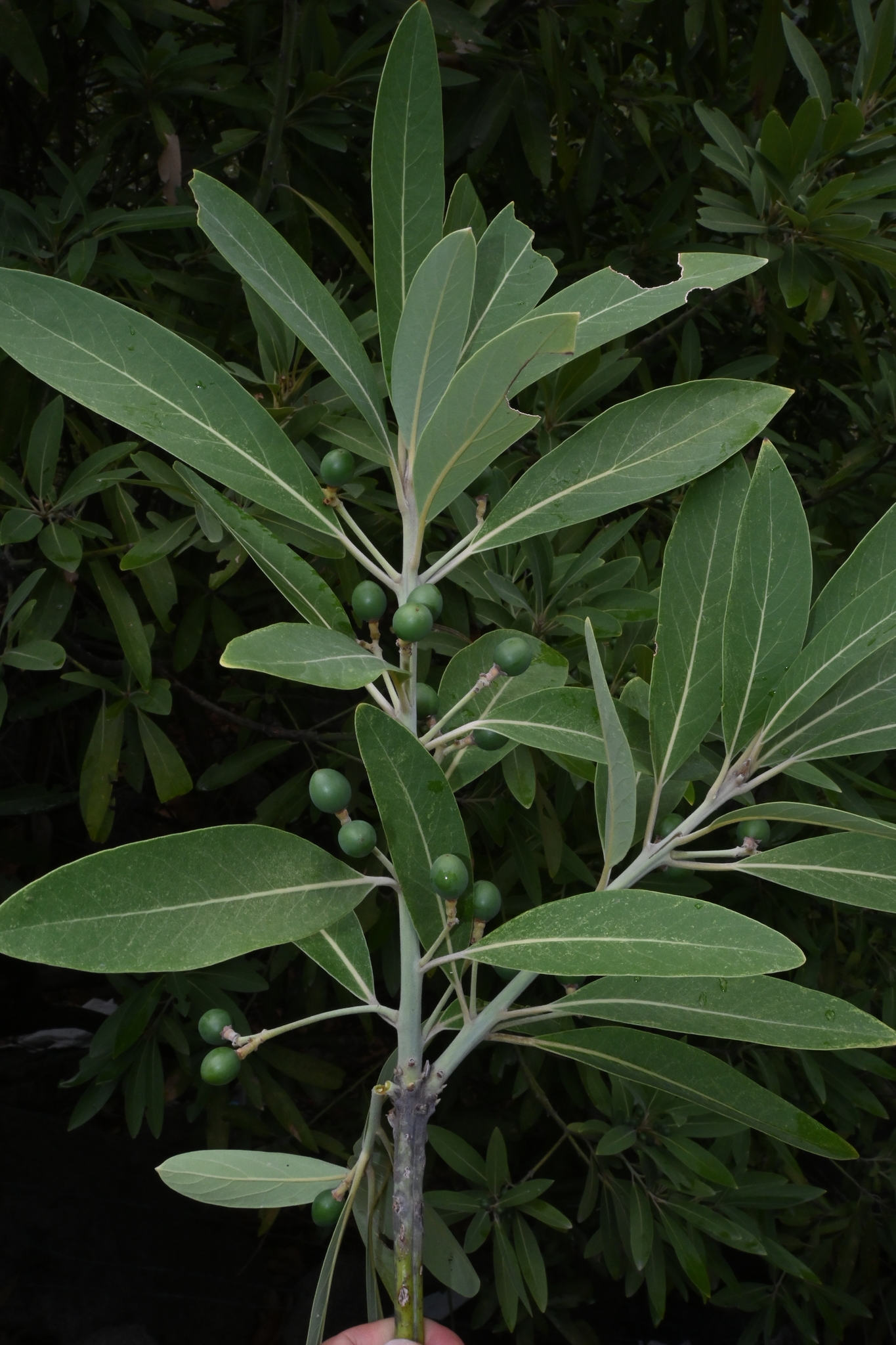

Conservation status
- Least Concern (IUCN 3.1)

Scientific classification
- Kingdom: Plantae
- Clade: Embryophytes
- Clade: Tracheophytes
- Clade: Spermatophytes
- Clade: Angiosperms
- Clade: Magnoliids
- Order: Laurales
- Family: Lauraceae
- Genus: Persea
- Species: P. liebmannii

Binomial name
- Persea liebmannii Mez

Synonyms
- Homotypic Synonyms: Mutisiopersea liebmannii (Mez) Kosterm.; Heterotypic Synonyms: Mutisiopersea podadenia (S.F.Blake) Kosterm.; Persea flavifolia Lundell; Persea petenensis Lundell; Persea podadenia S.F.Blake; Persea podadenia var. glabriramea I.M.Johnst.

= Persea liebmannii =

Species of flowering plant

Persea liebmannii is a species of flowering plant in the family Lauraceae. It is a tree native to Belize, Guatemala, and Mexico.
