= Persea willdenovii =

Conservation status
- Least Concern (IUCN 2.3)

Scientific classification
- Kingdom: Plantae
- Clade: Tracheophytes
- Clade: Angiosperms
- Clade: Magnoliids
- Order: Laurales
- Family: Lauraceae
- Genus: Persea
- Species: P. willdenovii

Binomial name
- Persea willdenovii Kosterm.

Synonyms
- Persea pyrifolia Nees & Mart., nom. illeg.; Persea pyrifolia var. rigida Meisn.

Species of flowering plant

Persea willdenovii is a species of plant in the family Lauraceae. It endemic to eastern and southern Brazil.
