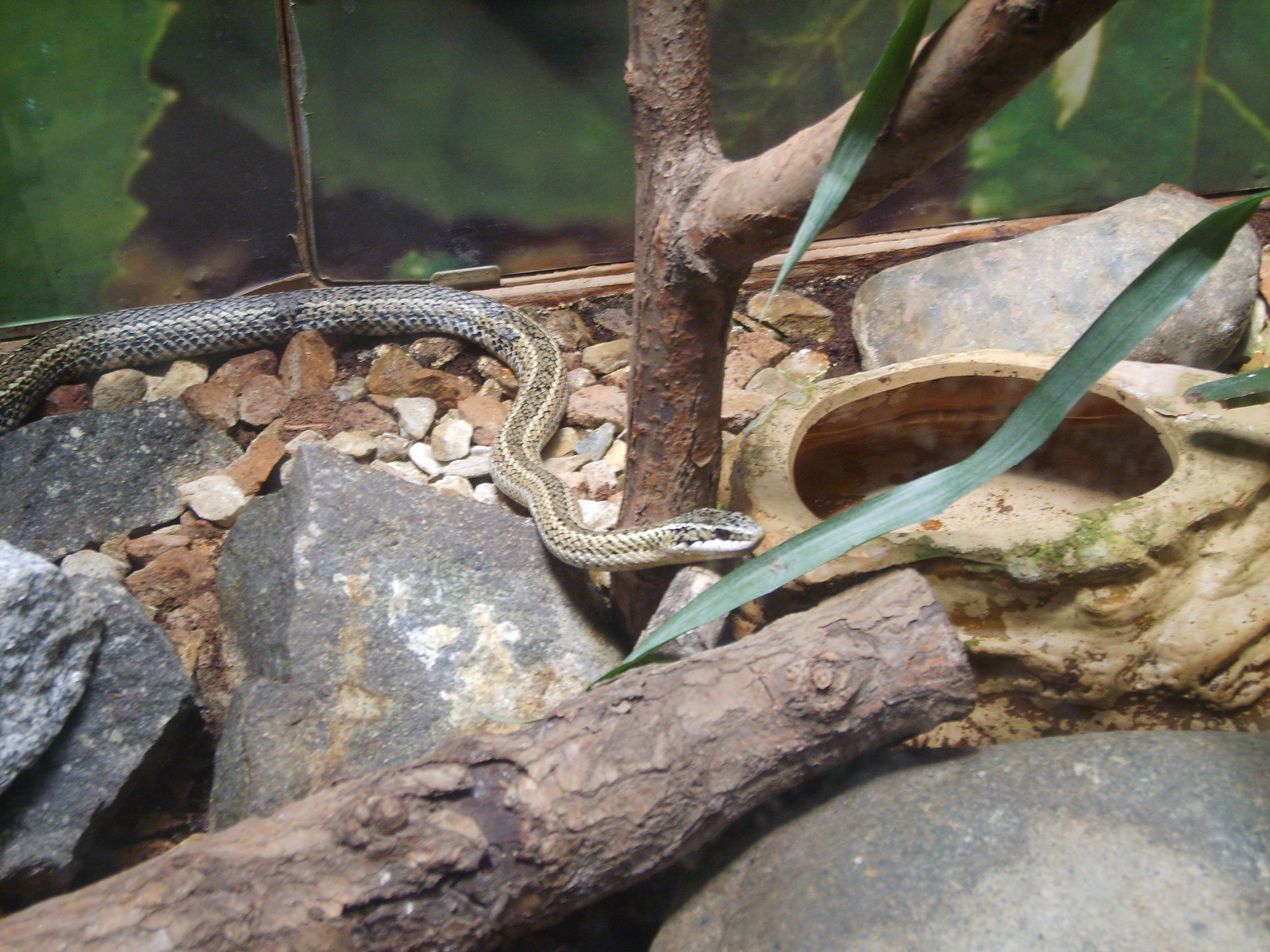

Conservation status
- Least Concern (IUCN 3.1)

Scientific classification
- Kingdom: Animalia
- Phylum: Chordata
- Class: Reptilia
- Order: Squamata
- Suborder: Serpentes
- Family: Colubridae
- Genus: Philodryas
- Species: P. chamissonis

Binomial name
- Philodryas chamissonis (Wiegmann, 1834)

Synonyms
- Coronella chamissonis Wiegmann, 1834; Psammophis temminckii Schlegel, 1837; Tæniophis tantillus Girard, 1854; Dromicus chamissonis — Steindachner, 1867; Liophis luctuosa Philippi, 1899; Philodryas chamissonis — Sallaberry-Pincheira et al., 2011

= Philodryas chamissonis =

Species of snake

Philodryas chamissonis, commonly known as the Chilean green racer and the Chilean long-tailed snake, is a species of moderately venomous opisthoglyphous (rear-fanged) snake in the family Colubridae. The species is endemic to Chile.

== Etymology ==
The specific name, chamissonis, is in honor of German botanist and poet Adelbert von Chamisso.

== Geographic range ==
P. chamissonis has a large distribution in Chile, from Paposo to Valdivia.

== Description ==
Usually, P. chamissonis is gray, with black and white longitudinal stripes on the body. It is a medium-sized snake, which usually reaches 1.4 m (4.6 ft) in total length (including tail).

The length of the tail is 25–28.5 % of the total length. There are 8 upper labials, the 4th and 5th entering the eye. The smooth dorsal scales are arranged in 19 rows at midbody. Ventrals 179–225; anal plate divided; subcaudals 100–122.

== Habitat ==
P. chamissonis lives in a large variety of habitats, at altitudes from sea level to 2,300 m (7,500 ft).

== Diet ==
A Philodryas chamissonis snake eating a Liolaemus tenuis lizard.

The diet of P. chamissonis is mainly composed of little rodents, birds, amphibians, and other smaller reptiles. For example, it especially preys upon lizards of the genus Liolaemus.

== Reproduction ==
P. chamissonis is an oviparous reptile.

== Venom ==
Because P. chamissonis is rarely found, bites by it are uncommon. However, its bite is painful and causes extensive swelling.
