= Persea brevipetiolata =

Scientific classification
- Kingdom: Plantae
- Clade: Tracheophytes
- Clade: Angiosperms
- Clade: Magnoliids
- Order: Laurales
- Family: Lauraceae
- Genus: Persea
- Species: P. brevipetiolata

Binomial name
- Persea brevipetiolata van der Werff

Species of flowering plant

Persea brevipetiolata is a plant species known from the Mexican States of Oaxaca and Veracruz. It is found in lowland forests in the Isthmus of Tehuantepec at elevations less than 250 m.

Persea brevipetiolata is a tree up to 8 m tall. Leaves are elliptical, thick and leathery, up to 16 cm long, with petioles less than 8 mm long, and with raised veins forming a conspicuous network on the underside. Flowers are about 4 mm in diameter, hairless, yellow-green. Fruits are spherical, about 2 mm in diameter.
