= Coleophora octagonella =

Octagonal casemaker moth

Scientific classification
- Kingdom: Animalia
- Phylum: Arthropoda
- Class: Insecta
- Order: Lepidoptera
- Family: Coleophoridae
- Genus: Coleophora
- Species: C. octagonella

Binomial name
- Coleophora octagonella Walsingham, 1882

Species of moth

Coleophora octagonella, the octagonal casemaker moth, is a moth of the family Coleophoridae. It is found in the United States, including Alabama, Florida, Georgia, North Carolina and Tennessee.

The species is misplaced in the genus Coleophora and the family Coleophoridae. It actually belongs to the family Batrachedridae. The larvae feed on lichens which grow on Quercus trees.
