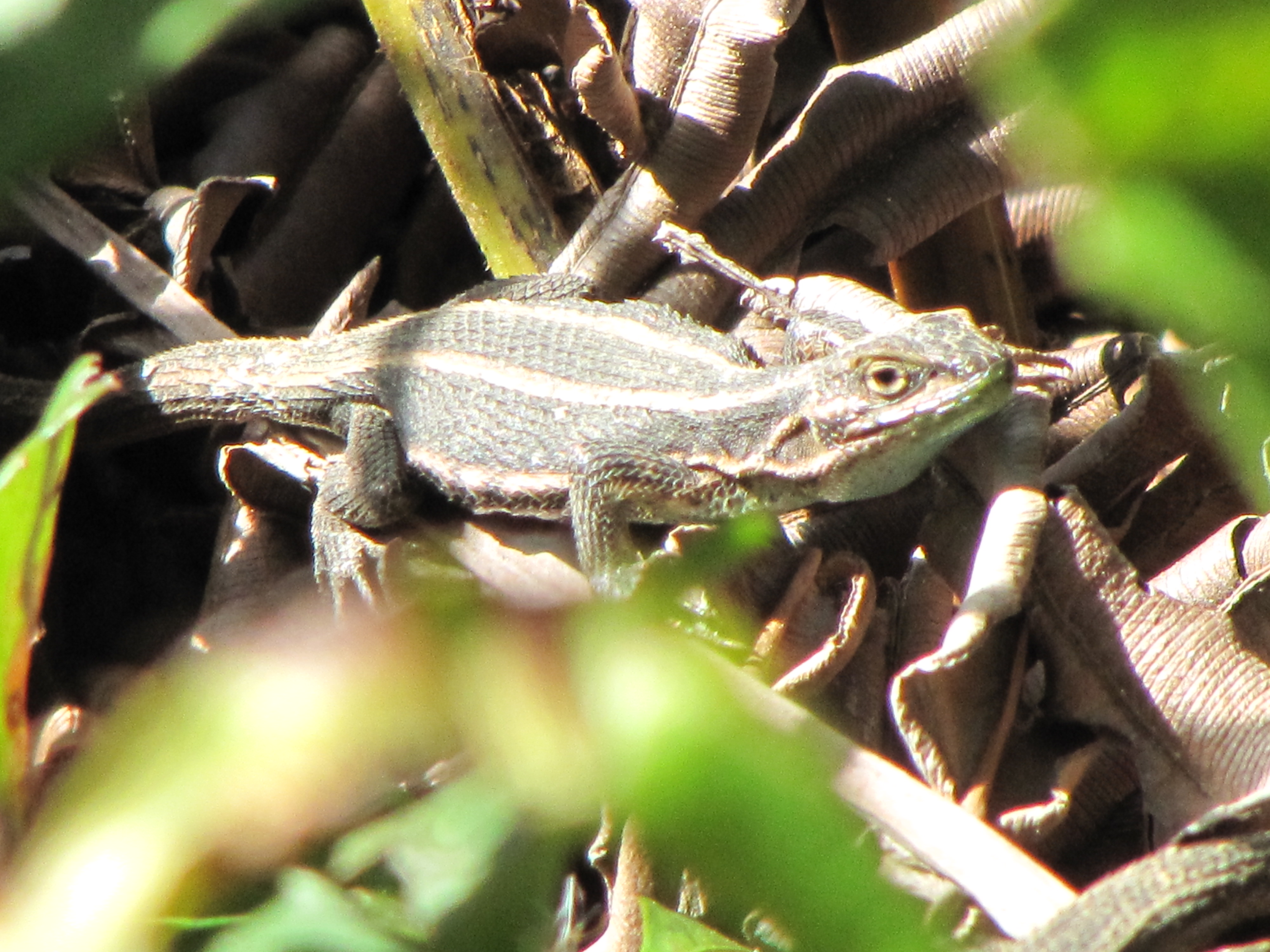

Conservation status
- Least Concern (IUCN 3.1)

Scientific classification
- Kingdom: Animalia
- Phylum: Chordata
- Class: Reptilia
- Order: Squamata
- Suborder: Iguania
- Family: Liolaemidae
- Genus: Liolaemus
- Species: L. cyanogaster

Binomial name
- Liolaemus cyanogaster (A.M.C. Dumeril & Bibron, 1837)

Synonyms
- Proctotretus cyanogaster A.M.C. Duméril & Bibron, 1837; Liolaemus cyanogaster — Gray, 1845; Ptychodeira cyanogaster — Girard, 1858; Liolaemus cyanogaster — Boulenger, 1885

= Liolaemus cyanogaster =

Species of lizard

Liolaemus cyanogaster, commonly known as the cyan tree iguana, is a species of lizard in the family Liolaemidae. The species is endemic to Chile, being abundant between Concepción and Puerto Montt.

== Habitat ==
The preferred natural habitats of L. cyanogaster are grassland, shrubland, and forest, at altitudes from sea level to 800 m (2,600 ft).

== Diet ==
L. cyanogaster preys upon insects.

== Reproduction ==
L. cyanogaster is viviparous.
