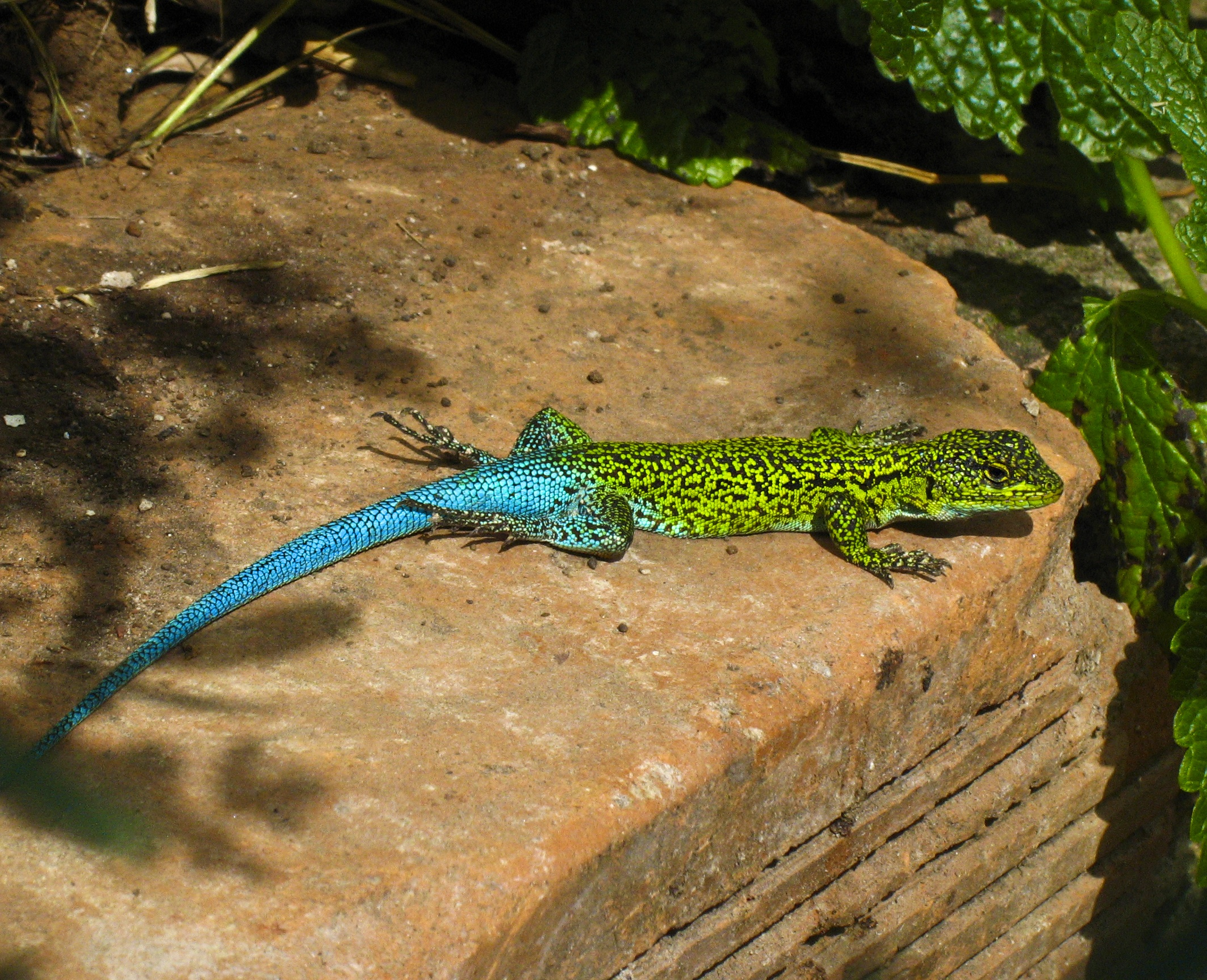
- Male Liolaemus tenuis

Conservation status
- Least Concern (IUCN 3.1)

Scientific classification
- Kingdom: Animalia
- Phylum: Chordata
- Class: Reptilia
- Order: Squamata
- Suborder: Iguania
- Family: Liolaemidae
- Genus: Liolaemus
- Species: L. tenuis

Binomial name
- Liolaemus tenuis Duméril & Bibron, 1837

= Liolaemus tenuis =

Species of lizard

Liolaemus tenuis, known as the jewel lizard, is a species of lizard in the family Liolaemidae. Other names are thin tree iguana, slender lizard and thin lizard. It is endemic to Chile.

It is a relatively small species, with a 5.5 cm snout–vent length. Of diurnal habits, it feeds mainly of insects. It is sometimes kept as a pet.

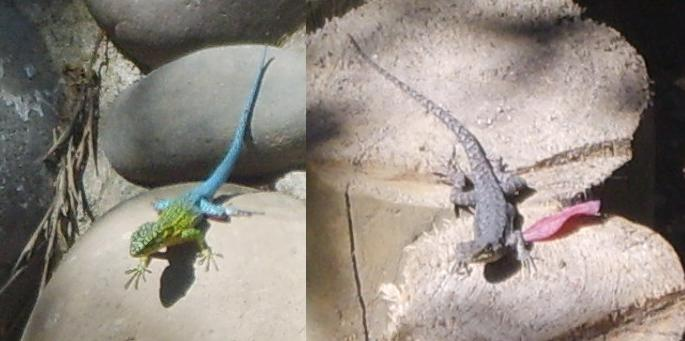
Male and female

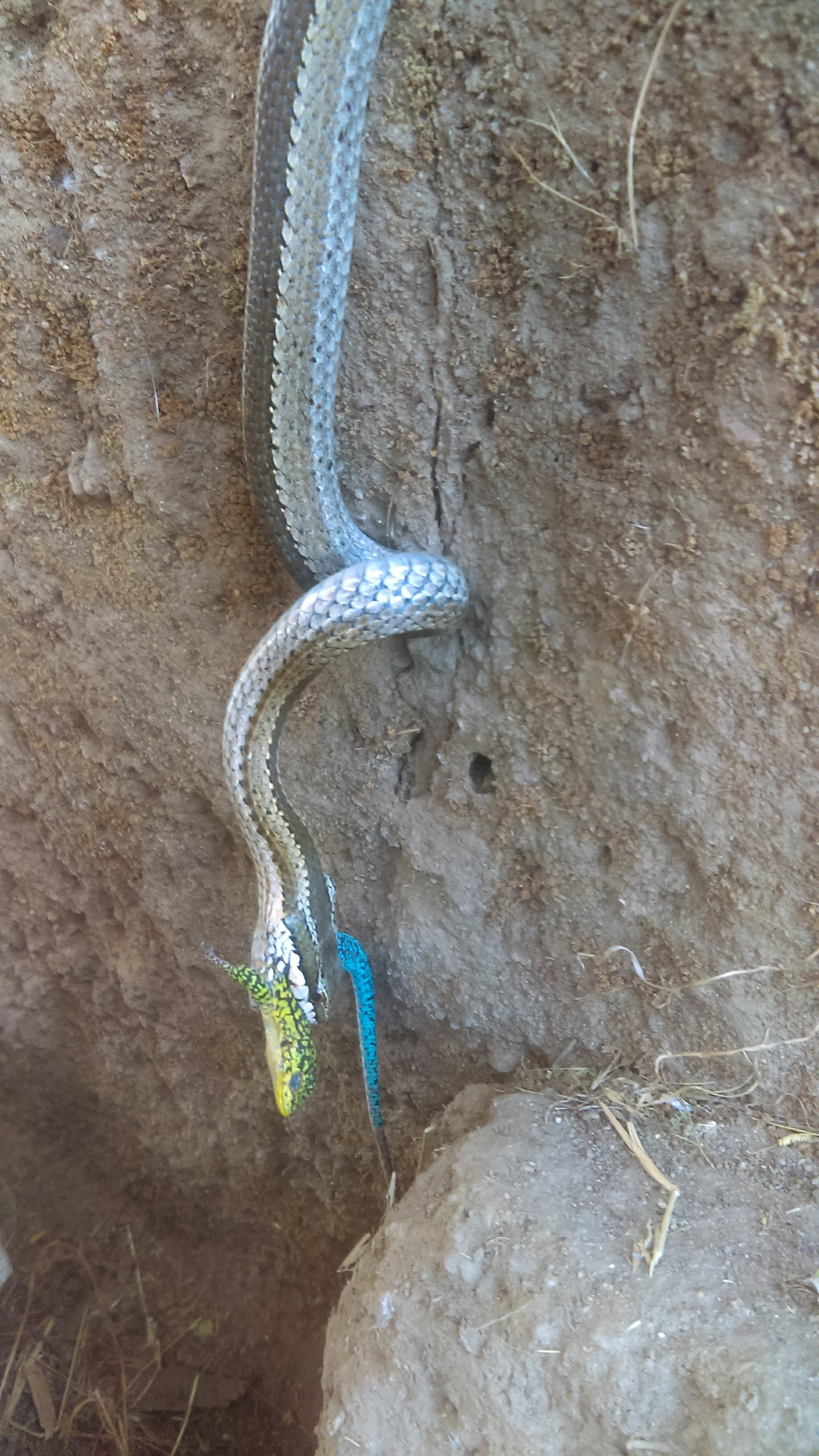
A Philodryas chamissonis snake eating a Liolaemus tenuis.
