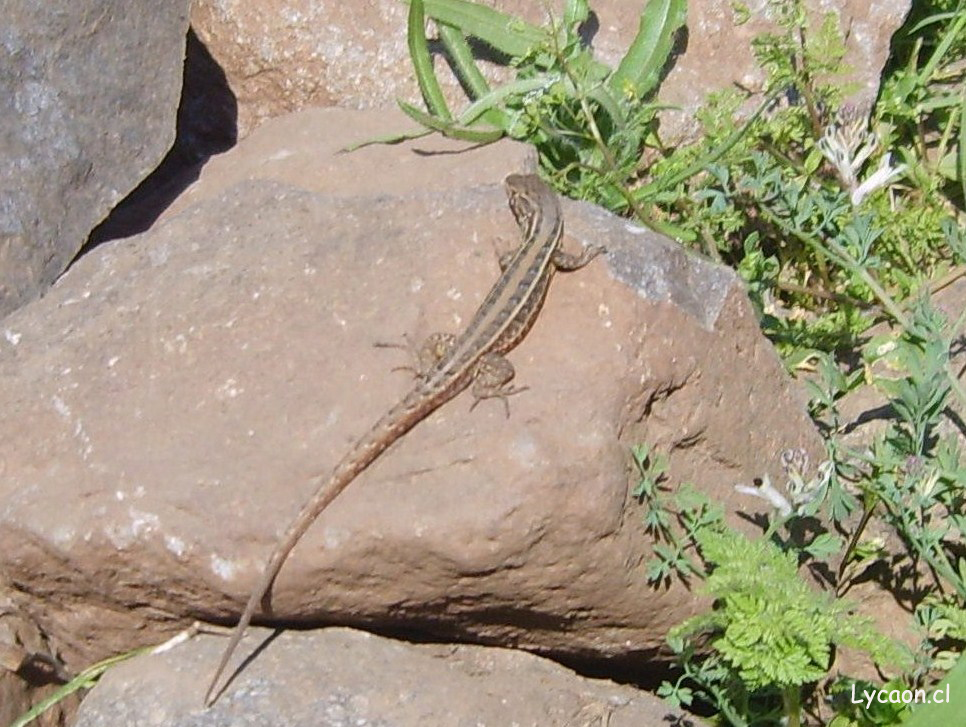

Conservation status
- Least Concern (IUCN 3.1)

Scientific classification
- Kingdom: Animalia
- Phylum: Chordata
- Class: Reptilia
- Order: Squamata
- Suborder: Iguania
- Family: Liolaemidae
- Genus: Liolaemus
- Species: L. lemniscatus

Binomial name
- Liolaemus lemniscatus Gravenhorst, 1837

= Liolaemus lemniscatus =

Species of lizard

Liolaemus lemniscatus, commonly known as wreath tree iguana or elegant tree iguana, is a species of lizard in the family Liolaemidae found in Argentina and Chile.
