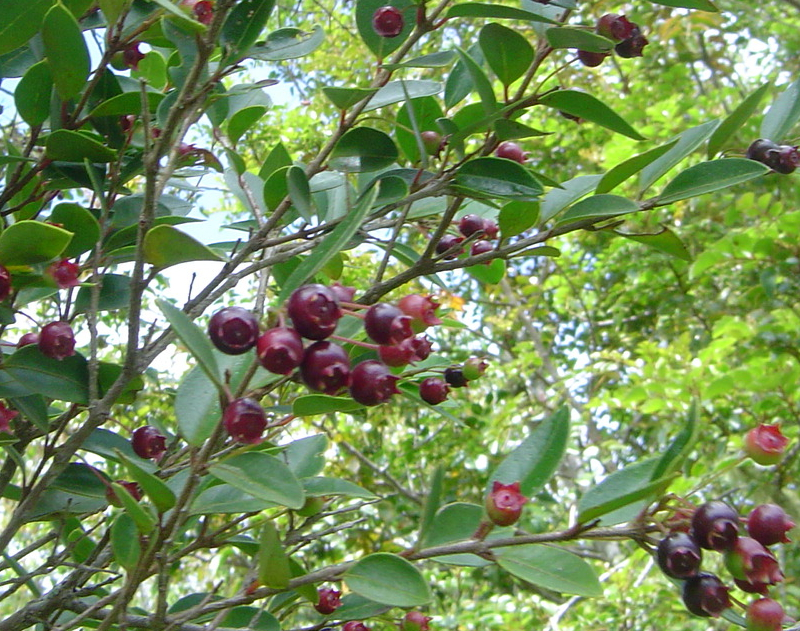
- Luma with fruits

Conservation status
- Least Concern (IUCN 3.1)

Scientific classification
- Kingdom: Plantae
- Clade: Tracheophytes
- Clade: Angiosperms
- Clade: Eudicots
- Clade: Rosids
- Order: Myrtales
- Family: Myrtaceae
- Genus: Amomyrtus
- Species: A. luma

Binomial name
- Amomyrtus luma (Molina) D.Legrand & Kausel

Synonyms
- List: Eugenia darwinii Hook.f.; Myrceugenia luma (Molina) I.M.Johnst. nom. illeg.; Myrcia lechleriana Miq.; Myrtus darwinii (Hook.f.) Barnéoud; Myrtus lechleriana (Miq.) Sealy; Myrtus luma Molina; Myrtus luma Barnéoud nom. illeg.; Myrtus multiflora Juss. ex J.St.-Hil.; Myrtus reloncavi Barnéoud ex F.Phil.; Myrtus valdiviana Phil.; Pseudocaryophyllus darwinii (Hook.f.) Burret; Pseudocaryophyllus multiflorus (Juss. ex J.St.-Hil.) Burret

= Amomyrtus luma =

Luma

Species of tree

Amomyrtus luma, known as luma, is a species of tree in the family Myrtaceae. It is native to Chile and Argentina. It grows from Colchagua to Aysen (34 to 45°S). This species occurs in rainforests, near streams, and in other moist sites.

== Description ==
Luma is an evergreen tree that measures up to 25 m (80 ft) tall and up to 50 cm (25 in) in diameter, with smooth bark, decorticant, reddish to brown. The leaves are opposite, in an oval to oblong shape, with an acute apex that ends in a pointed end up to 1 mm long. The petioles are hairy, 2–4 mm long. New shoots are hairy, which distinguishes it from Amomyrtus meli, a species that it strongly resembles. The flowers are hermaphroditic, with 5 fused sepals and 5 free white petals about 4 mm long. The stamens are numerous (30–45) and 4–5 mm long. The fruit is a black to purplish-black berry when mature, 1–1.5 cm in diameter, generally with 3 seeds, about 3–4.5 mm.

== Uses ==
The fruits, which are called cauchaos, are edible and used to make marmalade. The wood is extremely hard and resistant and is used as firewood. It has been planted in Spain.

== Etymology ==
The name Amomyrtus comes from the Greek Amos (fragrant) and the family name Myrtus, and Luma is the Mapuche name for the tree.
