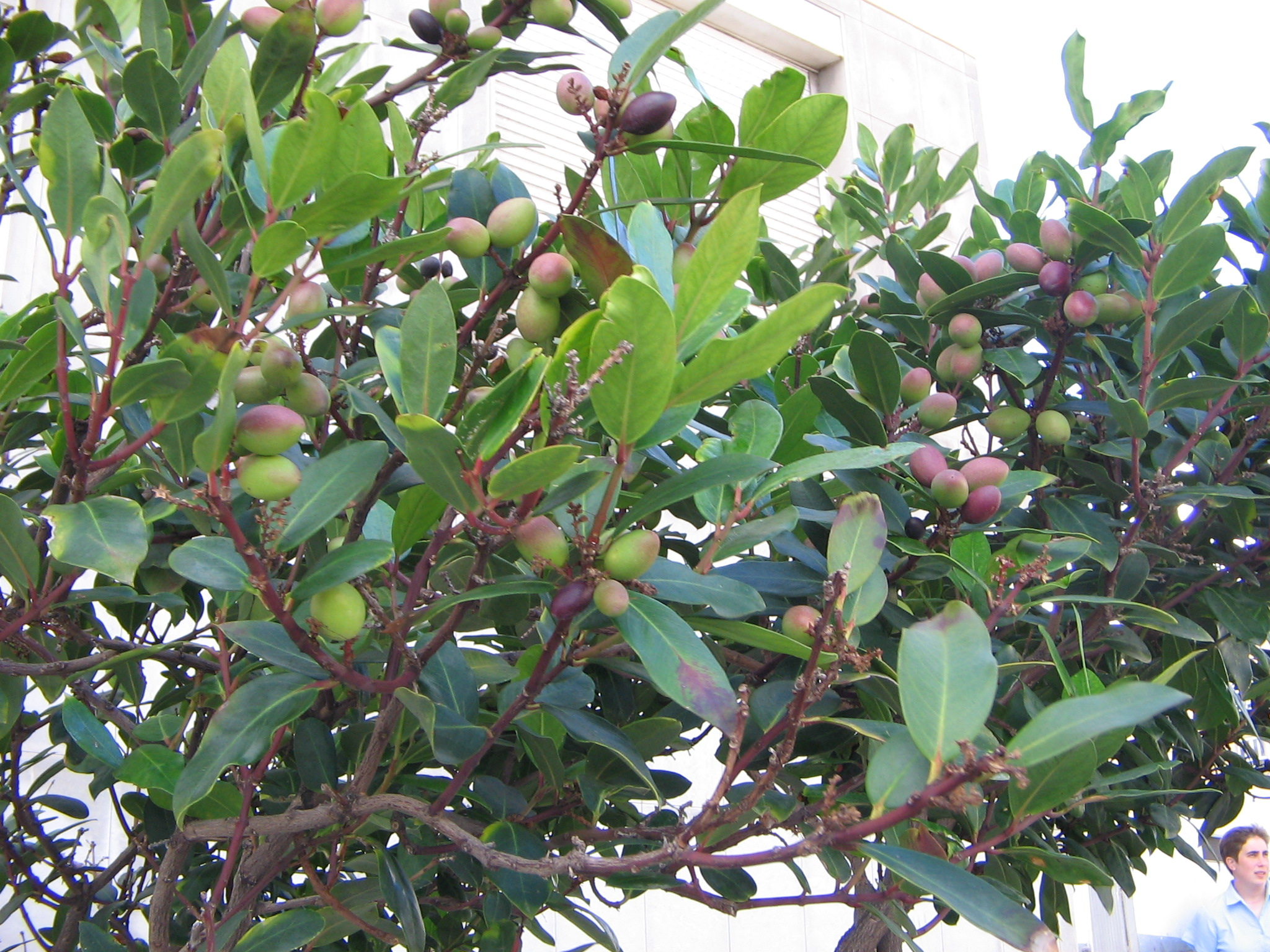

Conservation status
- Least Concern (IUCN 3.1)

Scientific classification
- Kingdom: Plantae
- Clade: Tracheophytes
- Clade: Angiosperms
- Clade: Magnoliids
- Order: Laurales
- Family: Lauraceae
- Genus: Persea
- Species: P. indica

Binomial name
- Persea indica (L.) Spreng.

Synonyms
- Borbonia indica (L.) J.Presl; Laurus americana Nees; Laurus indica L. (1753) (basionym); Laurus latifolia Salisb.; Laurus teneriffae Poir.; Ocotea indica (L.) Kostel.; Persea pseudoindica Link; Persea teneriffae F.Muell.; Phoebe indica (L.) Pax

= Persea indica =

Species of tree

Persea indica is a large, evergreen tree in the laurel family (Lauraceae), native to humid uplands on Madeira and the Canary Islands in the North Atlantic. It belongs to the genus Persea, a group of evergreen trees including the avocado. It is threatened by habitat loss.

It has been introduced to a number of islands in the nearby Azores.

== Overview ==
Fossil evidence indicates that genus Persea originated in West Africa during the Paleocene, and spread to Asia, South America, Europe and North America. It is thought that the gradual drying of Africa, west Asia, and the Mediterranean from the Oligocene to the Pleistocene, and the glaciation of Europe during the Pleistocene, caused the extinction of the genus across these regions, resulting in the present distribution. Genus Persea disappeared from increasingly xerophytic Africa, starting with the formation of the Benguela Current. It is extinct in Africa, save for P. indica, which survives in the cloud forests of the Canary Islands.

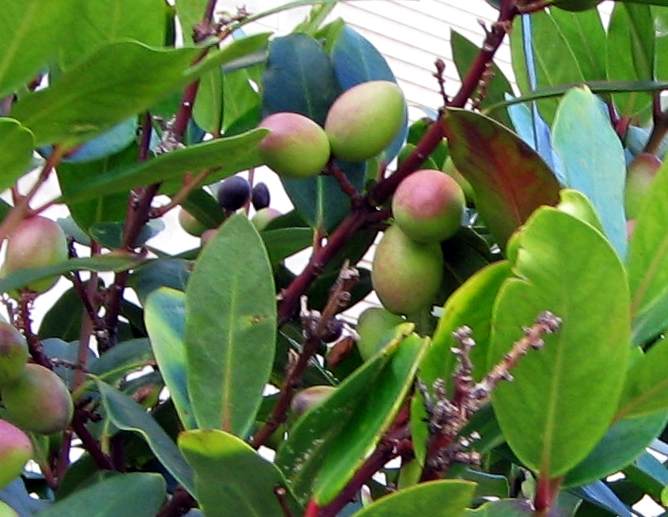
Fruits

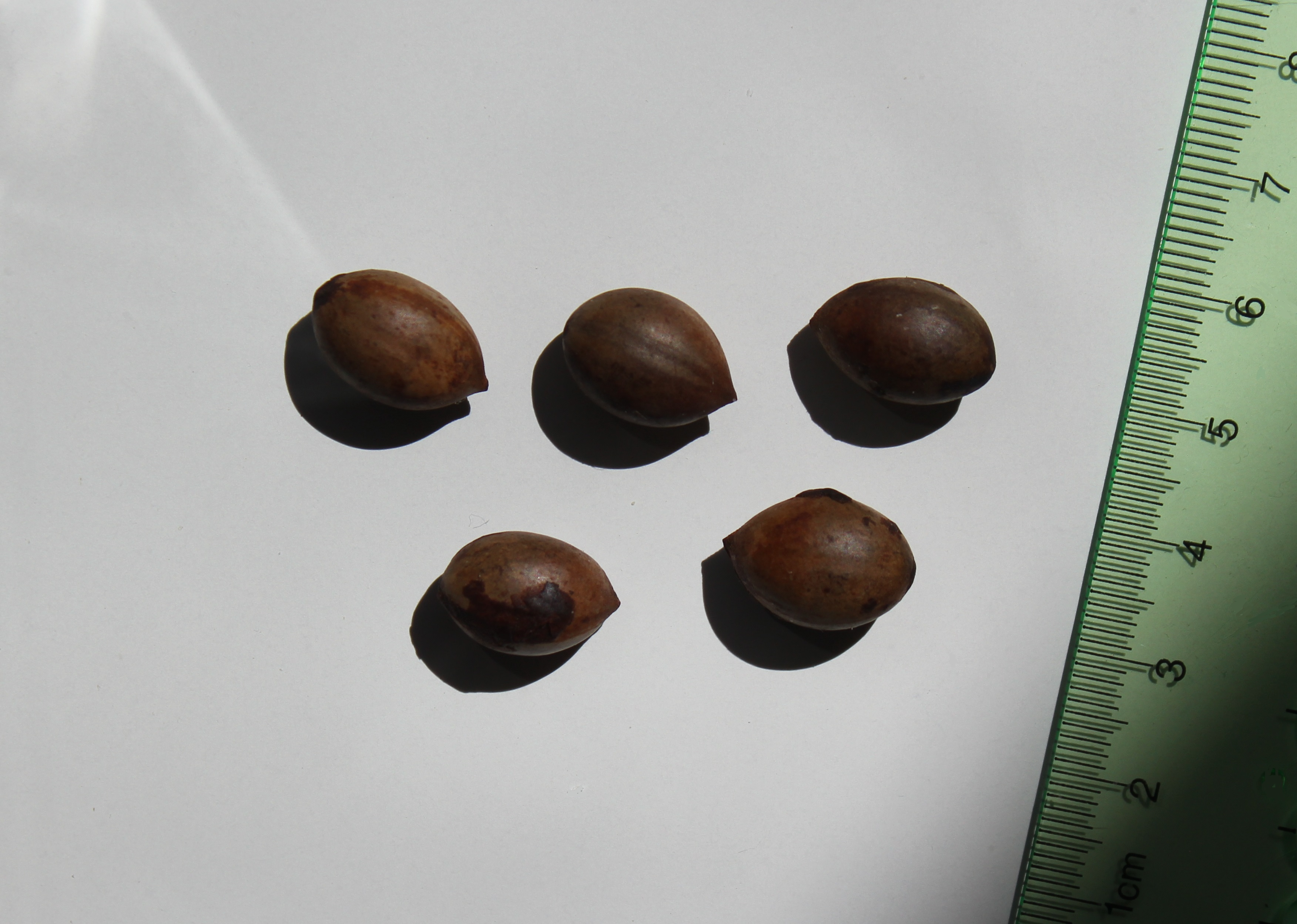
Seeds

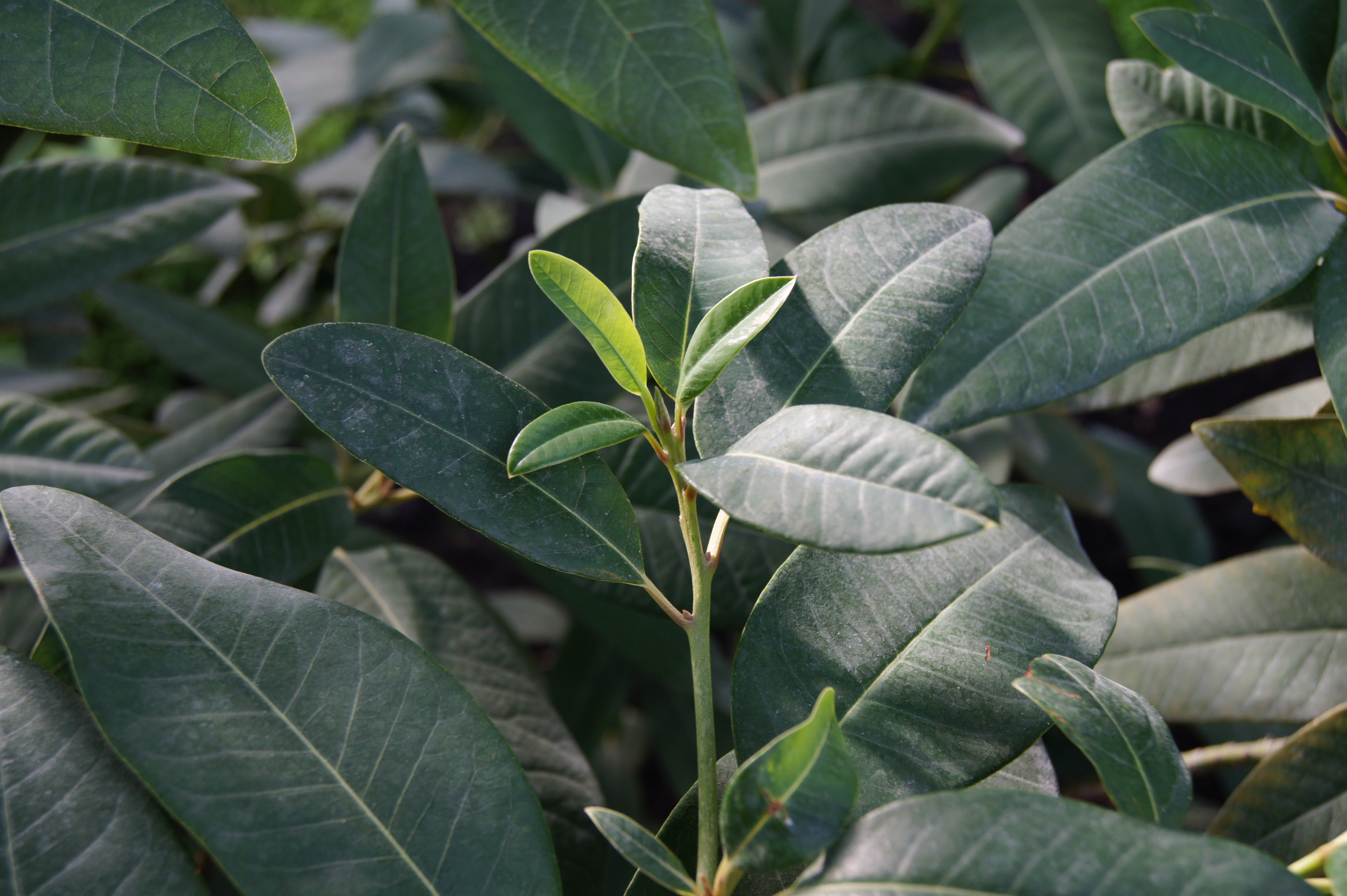
Shoot

== Fossil record ==
Fossils of Persea indica have been described from the fossil flora of Kızılcahamam district in Turkey, which is of early Pliocene age.

== See also ==
- List of animal and plant symbols of the Canary Islands
