= Nothaphoebe =

Scientific classification
- Kingdom: Plantae
- Clade: Tracheophytes
- Clade: Angiosperms
- Clade: Magnoliids
- Order: Laurales
- Family: Lauraceae
- Genus: Nothaphoebe; Blume

Synonyms
- Euphoebe Blume ex Meisn.

Genus of flowering plants

Nothaphoebe is a genus of plant in family Lauraceae. It contains 21 species, which range from mainland Southeast Asia through Indonesia and the Philippines to New Guinea.

== Accepted species ==
21 species are currently accepted:

- Nothaphoebe annamensis A.Chev. ex H.Liu – Vietnam
- Nothaphoebe condensa Ridl. – Cambodia, Peninsular Malaysia, Myanmar, Thailand, and Vietnam
- Nothaphoebe coriacea (Kosterm.) Kosterm. – Borneo, Peninsular Malaysia, and Sumatra
- Nothaphoebe crassifolia (Ridl.) Kosterm. – Mentawai Islands
- Nothaphoebe elata (Kosterm.) Kosterm. – New Guinea
- Nothaphoebe falcata Blume – Sumatra
- Nothaphoebe foetida (Kosterm.) Kosterm. – Borneo
- Nothaphoebe gigaphylla (Kosterm.) Kosterm. – Bacan Islands in the Maluku Islands
- Nothaphoebe havilandii Gamble – Borneo
- Nothaphoebe helophila (Kosterm.) Kosterm. – Sumatra
- Nothaphoebe heterophylla Merr. – Borneo
- Nothaphoebe kingiana Gamble – Peninsular Malaysia and Vietnam
- Nothaphoebe leytensis (Elmer) Merr. – Philippines
- Nothaphoebe macrocarpa (Blume) Meisn. – Java and the Lesser Sunda Islands
- Nothaphoebe magnifica (Kosterm.) Kosterm. – Sumatra
- Nothaphoebe novoguineensis Kaneh. & Hatus. – New Guinea
- Nothaphoebe pachyphylla Kosterm. – Borneo
- Nothaphoebe pahangensis Kosterm. – Peninsular Malaysia
- Nothaphoebe sarawacensis Gamble – Borneo
- Nothaphoebe siamensis Kosterm. – Thailand
- Nothaphoebe umbelliflora (Blume) Blume – Thailand, Laos, Cambodia, Vietnam, Malaysia, Indonesia, Philippines, and New Guinea
