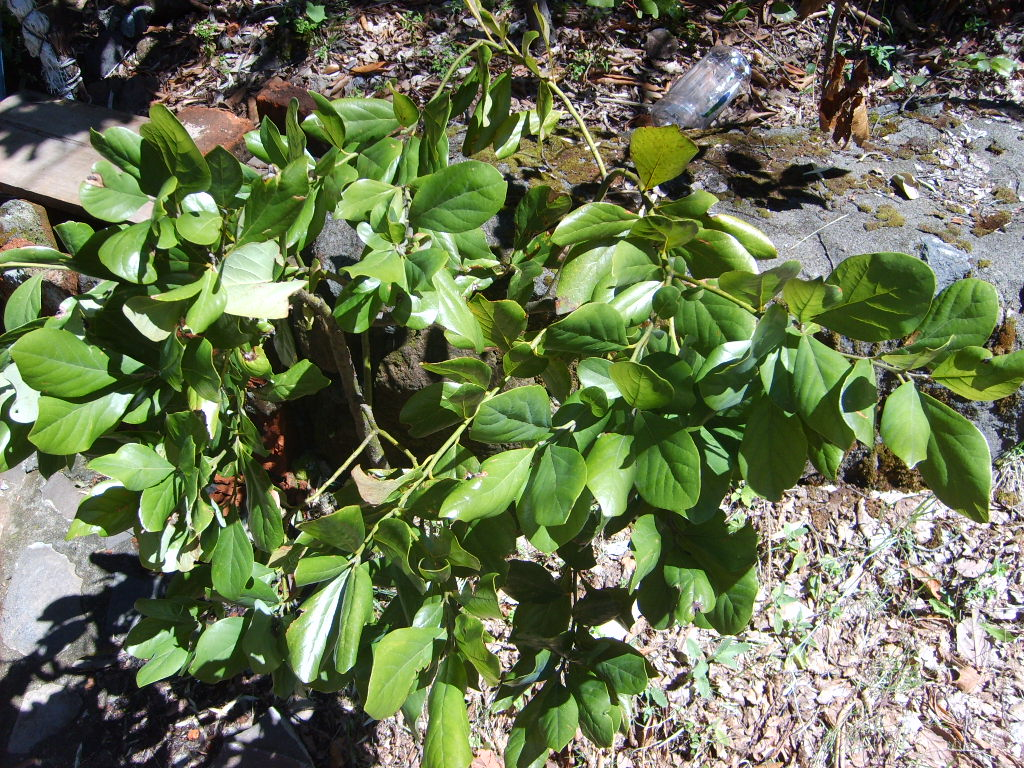

Conservation status
- Least Concern (IUCN 3.1)

Scientific classification
- Kingdom: Plantae
- Clade: Embryophytes
- Clade: Tracheophytes
- Clade: Angiosperms
- Clade: Magnoliids
- Order: Laurales
- Family: Lauraceae
- Genus: Persea
- Species: P. lingue

Binomial name
- Persea lingue (Ruiz & Pav.) Nees

Synonyms
- Laurus ligi Dombey ex Nees; Laurus linge Ruiz ex Meisn.; Laurus lingue Ruiz & Pav.; Laurus lingui Gillies ex Meisn.; Laurus palustris Poepp. ex Meisn.; Nothaphoebe lingue (Ruiz & Pav.) Baeza; Nothaphoebe meyeniana (Nees) Baeza; Persea frigida Linden; Persea intermedia Phil.; Persea lige Nees ex Meisn., not validly publ.; Persea lingue var. canescens Nees; Persea lingue var. palustris Nees; Persea meyeniana Nees

= Persea lingue =

Species of plant

Persea lingue, synonyms including Persea meyeniana, is an evergreen tree or shrub in the laurel family (Lauraceae), found in Argentina and Chile. It belongs to the genus Persea, a group of evergreen trees including the avocado. P. lingue was historically used in leather production, and is currently threatened by habitat loss.

== Description ==
Persea lingue is an evergreen tree which grows up to 25 m tall.

== Distribution and habitat ==
Persea lingue is native to central and south Chile and south Argentina. It grows in coastal and mountain forests from sea level up to 2000 m elevation.

== Use ==
In pharmacy its bark was once mentioned as cortex Lauri lingue, medicinal action unknown.

In the late 19th and early 20th century the bark of the tree which is rich in tannins was used to produce leather. An industry based in Valdivia and led by German immigrants and German-Chileans harvested the tree and exported the leather to Hamburg and Le Havre. A decline of wild stands of Persea lingue and tariffs imposed by the German Empire in 1898 contributed in the decline of the leather industry of southern Chile.

== Etymology ==
Persea see Persea. Lingue from Lingue River in Chile, where it grows.
