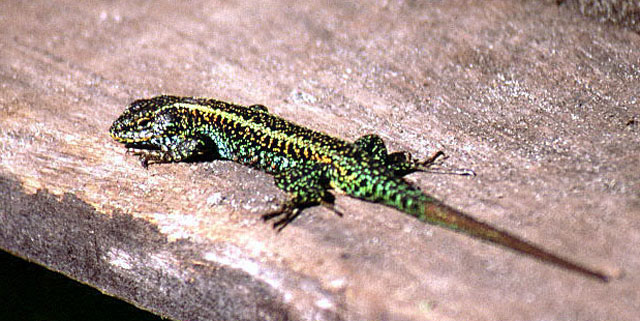

Conservation status
- Least Concern (IUCN 3.1)

Scientific classification
- Kingdom: Animalia
- Phylum: Chordata
- Class: Reptilia
- Order: Squamata
- Suborder: Iguania
- Family: Liolaemidae
- Genus: Liolaemus
- Species: L. pictus

Binomial name
- Liolaemus pictus (Duméril & Bibron, 1837)

= Liolaemus pictus =

Species of lizard

Liolaemus pictus, the painted tree iguana, is a species of lizard in the family Liolaemidae. It is found in Chile and Argentina.
