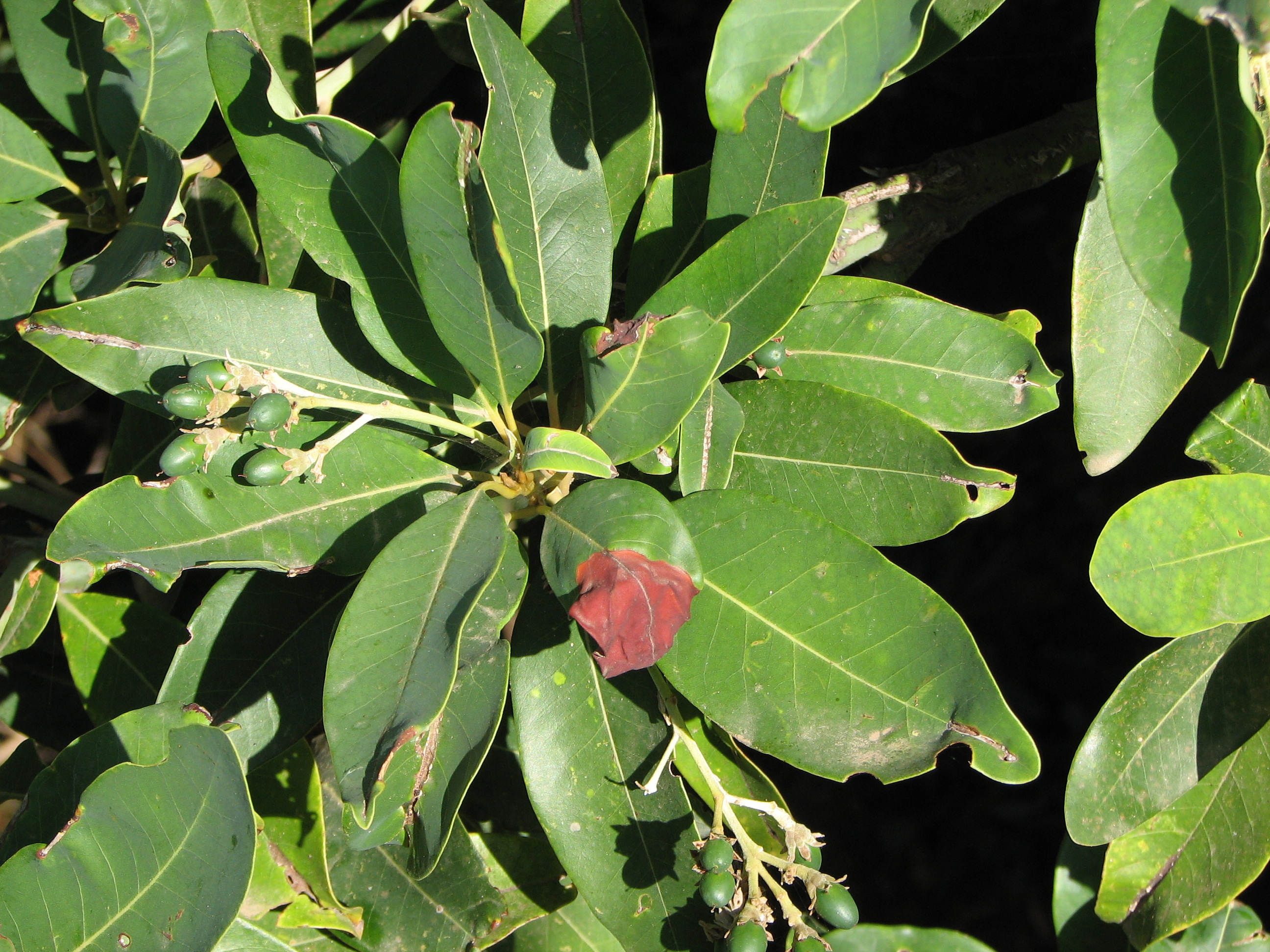
- Persea indica foliage and fruit
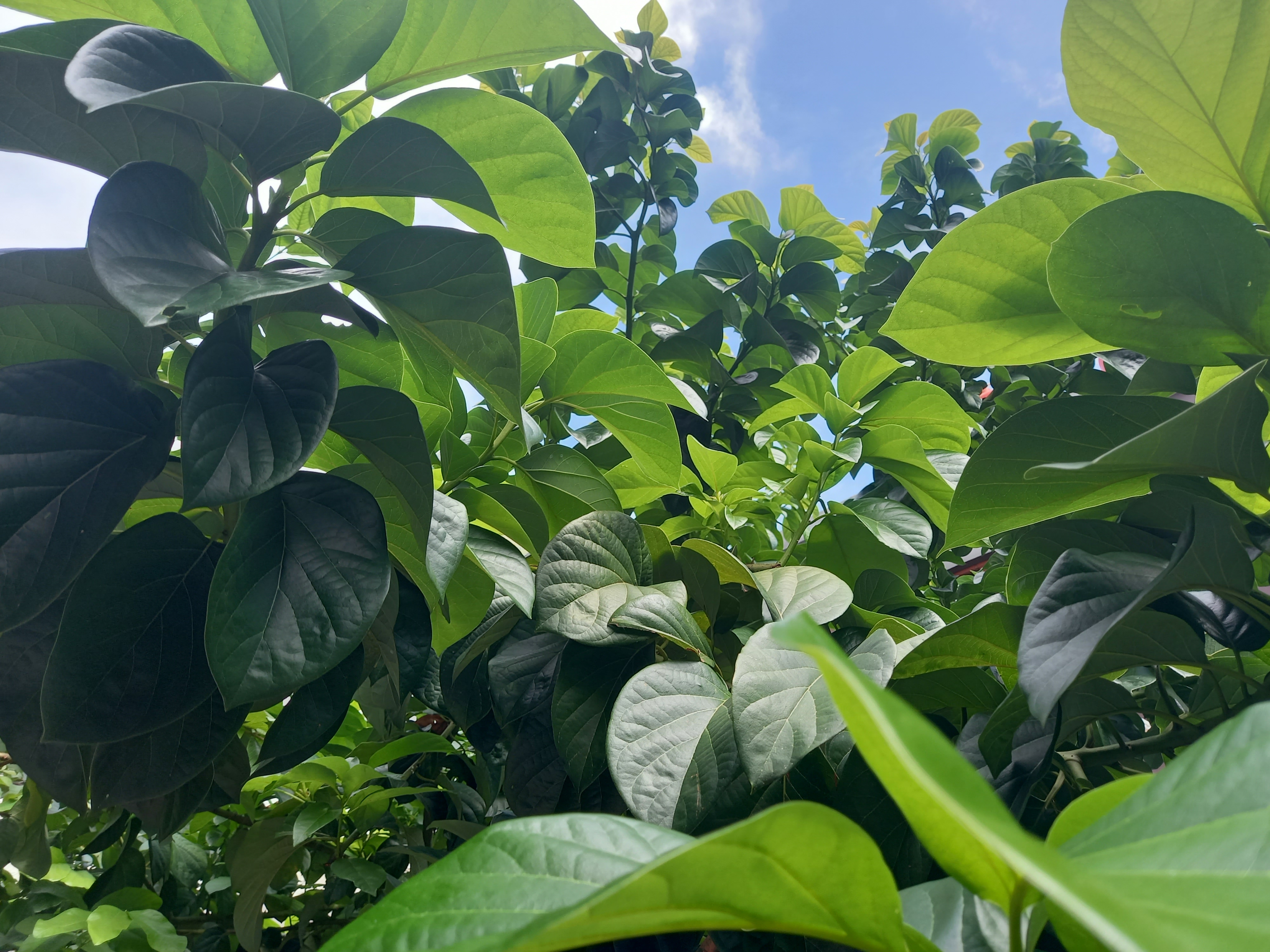
- Avocado (Persea americana) foliage

Scientific classification
- Kingdom: Plantae
- Clade: Tracheophytes
- Clade: Angiosperms
- Clade: Magnoliids
- Order: Laurales
- Family: Lauraceae
- Genus: Persea; Mill.

Type species
- Persea americana

Species
- See text. Complete list

Synonyms
- Apollonias Nees; Farnesia Heist. ex Fabr.; Mutisiopersea Kosterm.; Nyrophylla Neck.

= Persea =

Persea Temporal range: Eocene–Present

Genus of flowering plants in the laurel family

Persea is a genus of about 111 species of evergreen trees belonging to the laurel family, Lauraceae. The best-known member of the genus is the avocado, P. americana, widely cultivated in subtropical regions for its large, edible fruit.

== Overview ==
They are medium-size trees, 15–30 m (49.2–98.4 ft) tall at maturity. The leaves are simple, lanceolate to broad lanceolate, varying with species from 5–30 cm (1.97–11.81 in) long and 2–12 cm (0.79–4.72 in) broad, and arranged spirally or alternately on the stems. The flowers are in short panicles, with six small greenish-yellow perianth segments 3–6 mm (0.12–0.24 in) long, nine stamens and an ovary with a single embryo. The fruit is an oval or pear-shaped berry, with a fleshy outer covering surrounding the single seed; size is very variable among the species, from 1–1.5 cm (0.39–0.59 inches) in e.g. P. indica, up to 10–20 cm (3.94–7.87 inches) in some cultivars of P. americana.

== Distribution and ecology ==
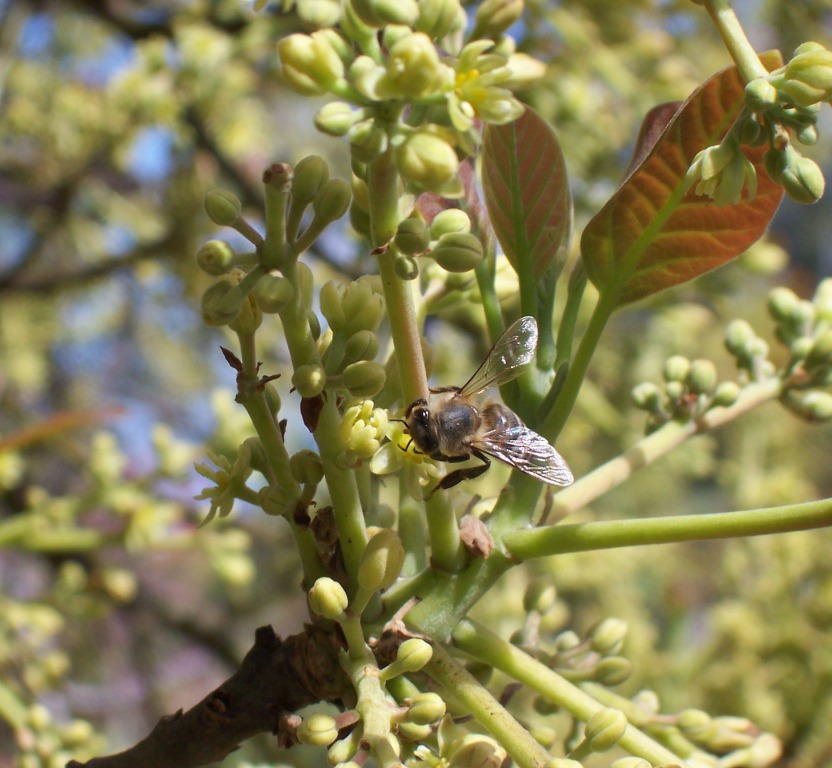
Persea americana flowers

The species of Persea have a disjunct distribution, with about 109 Neotropical species, ranging from Argentina and Chile in South America to Central America, Mexico, and the Caribbean; with two species, P. indica and P. barbujana, native to Madeira and the Canary Islands off northwest Africa. None of the species are very tolerant of severe winter cold, with the hardiest, P. lingue, surviving temperatures down to about −12 °C (10.4 °F); they also require continuously moist soil, and do not tolerate drought. A number of these species are found in forests that face threats of destruction or deforestation, including P. lingue in central Chile.

The family Lauraceae was part of the land flora of Gondwana, and many genera had migrated to South America via Antarctica over ocean landbridges by the time of the Paleocene. From South America they spread over most of the continent. When the North American and South American tectonic plates joined in the late Neogene, volcanic mountain building created island chains which later formed the Mesoamerican landbridge. Pliocene elevation created new habitats for speciation. While some genera died out in increasingly xerophytic mainland Africa, starting with the freezing of Antarctica about 20 million years ago and the formation of the Benguela current, others, which also reached South America and Mesoamerica, such as Beilschmiedia and Nectandra are still surviving today in Africa in a number of species. The genus, however, died out in Africa, except for P. indica and P. barbujana, which survive in the fog-shrouded mountains of the Canary Islands and Madeira.

Fossil evidence indicates that the genus originated in West Africa during the Paleocene, and spread to Asia, to South America, and to Europe and thence to North America. It is thought that the gradual drying of Africa, west Asia, and the Mediterranean from the Oligocene to the Pleistocene, and the glaciation of Europe during the Pleistocene, caused the extinction of the genus across these regions, resulting in the present distribution.

Since this habitat is constantly threatened by encroaching agriculture, the laurel forest animal or vegetal species have already become rare in many of its former habitats and are threatened by further habitat loss.

In Mesoamerica, Persea proliferated into many new species, and the berries of some of them constitute a valuable food supply for quetzals, trogoniform birds that live in the montane rainforests of Mesoamerica. In particular, the resplendent quetzal's favorite fruits are berries of wild relatives of the avocado. Their differing maturing times in the cloudforest determine the migratory movements of the quetzals to differing elevation levels in the forests. With a gape width of 21 mm (0.83 in), the quetzal swallows the small berry (aguacatillo) whole, which he catches while flying through the lower canopy of the tree, and then regurgitates the seed within 100 meters (328 ft) from the tree. Wheelright in 1983 observed that parent quetzals take far less time intervals to deliver fruits to the young brood than insects or lizards, reflecting the ease of procuring fruits, as opposed to capturing animal prey. Since the young are fed exclusively berries in the first 2 weeks after hatching, these berries must be of high nutritional value. Usually only the total percentage of water, sugar, nitrogen, crude fats and carbohydrates are reported by ornithologists.

Persea species are also used as food plants by the larvae of some Lepidoptera species including giant leopard moth, Coleophora octagonella (which feeds exclusively on P. carolinensis) and Hypercompe indecisa.

== Classification ==
The genus Persea includes two subgenera, Persea and Eriodaphne.

Graft-incompatibility and morphological and phylogenetic differences between subgenus Persea and subgenus Eriodaphne suggests that these too may be better treated as distinct genera. Kostermans (1993) founded the genus Mutisiopersea for these. Some authors place Persea barbujana from the Canary Islands in a separate genus Apollonias, but phylogenetic studies place it within subgenus Eriodaphne. The genus Tamala is included in Persea by many authors, and some authors treat the Asian genus Machilus as a subgenus of Persea. Another closely related genus, Beilschmiedia, is also sometimes included in Persea.

In a phylogenetic analysis of the "Persea group", which also includes Alseodaphne, Dehaasia, Machilus, Nothaphoebe, and Phoebe, Persea was found to be mostly monophyletic. The species Persea nudigemma was found to be more closely related to Phoebe, while Persea sphaerocarpa was found to be nested within a group of Alseodaphne species.

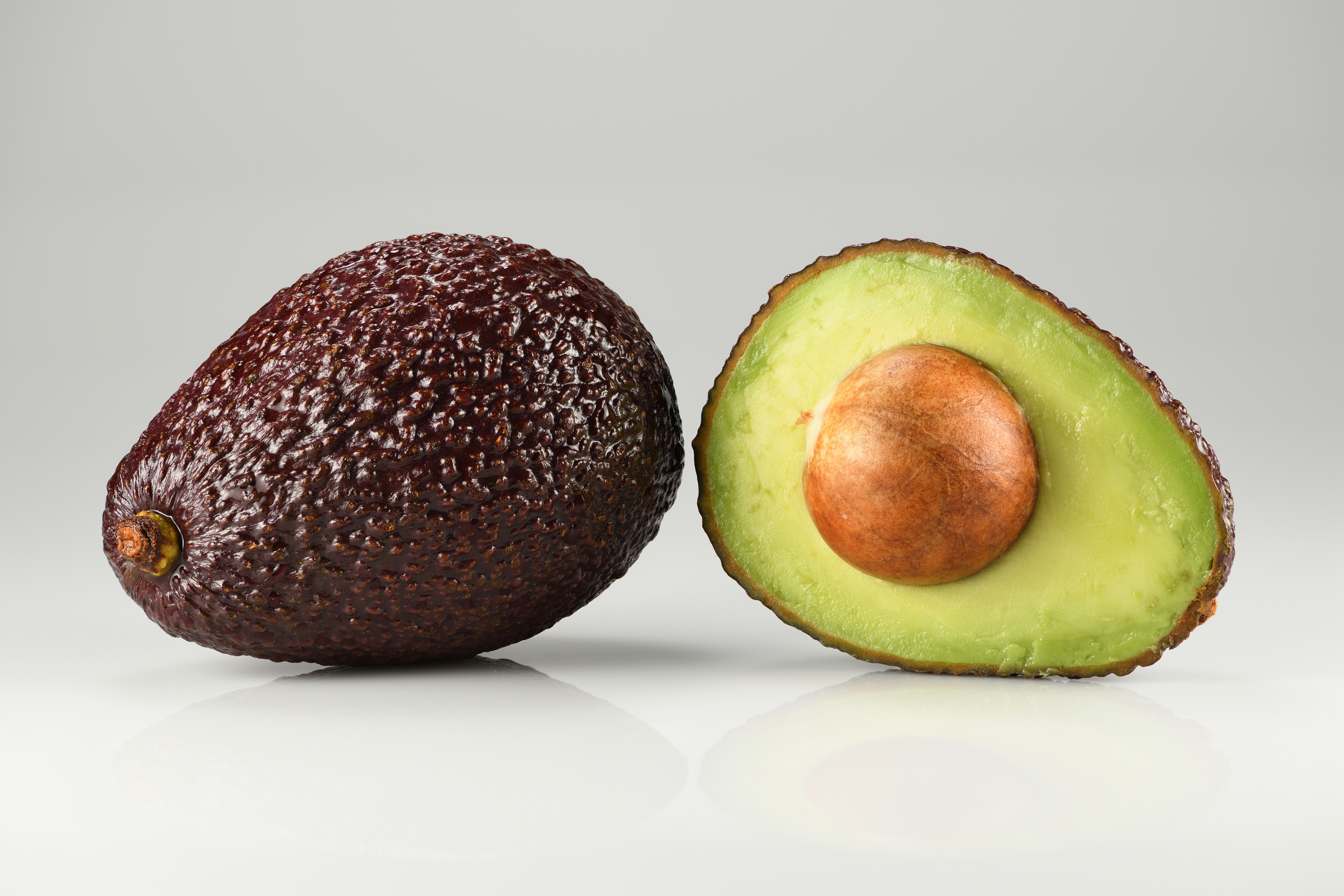
The avocado fruit, Persea americana

Subgenus Persea — Central America. Two species.

- Persea americana Mill. – Avocado
  - Persea americana var. drymifolia (Schltdl. & Cham.) S.F.Blake
  - Persea americana var. floccosa (Mez) Scora
  - Persea americana var. guatemalensis (L.O.Williams) Scora
  - Persea americana var. nubigena (L.O.Williams) L.E.Kopp
  - Persea americana var. steyermarkii (C.K.Allen) Scora
- Persea schiedeana Nees – Coyo

Subgenus Eriodaphne (Mutisiopersea) — The Americas and Macaronesia. About 109 species, including

- Persea alpigena (Sw.) Spreng.
- Persea brevipetiolata van der Werff – from Mexico
- Persea caerulea (Ruiz & Pav.) Mez
- Persea cinerascens S.F.Blake
- Persea donnell-smithii Mez
- Persea indica (L.) Spreng. – Viñátigo
- Persea lingue (Ruiz & Pav.) Nees – Lingue
- Persea longipes (Schltdl.) Meisn.
- Persea palustris (Raf.) Sarg. – Swampbay

=== Formerly placed here ===
- Cinnamodendron cinnamomifolium (Kunth) Kosterm. (as P. cinnamomifolia Kunth or P. mexicana (Meisn.) Hemsl.)
- Laurus azorica (Seub.) Franco (as P. azorica Seub.)
- Tamala borbonia (L.) Raf. (as Persea borbonia (L.) Spreng.)
- Tamala humilis (Nash) Small (as Persea humilis (Nash) House)
- Tamala palustris Raf. (as Persea palustris (Raf.) Sarg.)

=== Phylogeny ===
Based on

- - - - clade I
        - - - - - - - Mac. robusta
                    - Mac. sp. W14071
                    - Mac. sp. W14068
                  - Pho. minutiflora
                - Mac. japonica
                - Mac. decursinervis
              - - - Mac. grijsii
                  - Mac. platycarpa
                - Mac. yunnanensis
            - - - - Mac. kwangtungensis
                  - Mac. oculodracontis
                  - Mac. duthiei
                  - Mac. gamblei
                - - Mac. oreophila
                  - Mac. leptophylla
              - Pho. faberi
            - - - Mac. salicoides
                - Mac. pomifera
              - - Mac. salicina
                - Mac. thunbergii
              - Mac. breviflora
            - - - Mac. pingii
                - Mac. shweliensis
              - - Mac gongshanensis
                - Mac. phoenicis
              - Mac. monticola
          - Deh. caesia
        - - - - - - - Deh. hainanensis
                    - Als. sp. W17084
                  - Deh. sp. L20070187
                - Als. semecarpifolia
              - Als. huanglianshanensis
            - - Als. gigaphylla
              - Not. umbelliflora
          - - Deh. sp. A34
            - Deh. incrassata
      - clade II
        - Persea clade I
          - - - - - - - Per. aurata
                      - Per. splendens
                    - - Per. major
                      - Per. weberbaueri
                  - - Per. sp. V25232
                    - Per. sp. W19517
                - Per. alba
              - - - Per. sp. W14875
                  - Per. sp. B21834
                  - Per. lingue
                - Per. caerulea
            - - - - Per. borbonia
                  - Per. haenkeana
                - Per. palustris
              - Per. indica
          - Per. areolatocostae
        - Persea clade II
          - - Per. americana
            - Per. styermarkii
          - Apo. barbujana
    - clade III
      - - - Phoebe clade I
            - - - - - - Pho. formosana
                      - Pho. chekiangensis
                    - Pho. nanmu
                  - Pho. neurantha
                - Pho. lanceolata
              - - Pho. sp. L20070260
                - Pho. zhennan
            - Pho. macrocarpa
            - Pho. angustifolia
          - Phoebe clade II
            - - - Pho. cuneata
                - Pho. elliptica
              - Pho. sp. A49
            - - - Pho. puwenensis
                - Pho. hungmaoensis
              - Pho. megacalyx
        - Per. nudigemma
      - - - - Als. rugosa
            - Als. hainanensis
          - Als. sp. W14264
        - - Per. sphaerocarpa
          - Per. sp. W21874
      - - Als. petiolaris
        - Als. andersonii
  - - - - - - Neo. sericea
            - Neo. howii
          - Neo. cambodiana
        - - Act. cupularis
          - Act. trichocarpa
      - Lit. verticillata
    - - Lin. megaphylla
      - Lit. auriculata
      - Lin. erythrocarpa

== Etymology ==
Philip Miller derived Persea from the Greek name Περσέα. It was applied by Theophrastus and Hippocrates to an uncertain Egyptian tree, possibly Cordia myxa or a Mimusops species.

== Bibliography ==
- André Joseph Guillaume Henri Kostermans. 1993. Mutisiopersea Kostermans, a new genus in Lauraceae. Rheedea 3: 132–135.
- C. Michael Hogan. 2008. Chilean Wine Palm: Jubaea chilensis, GlobalTwitcher.com, ed. Nicklas Stromberg
- Lucille E. Kopp. 1966. "A taxonomic revision of the genus Persea in the Western Hemisphere (Persea-Lauracese)" Memoirs of the New York Botanical Garden 14(1): pp. 1–117
