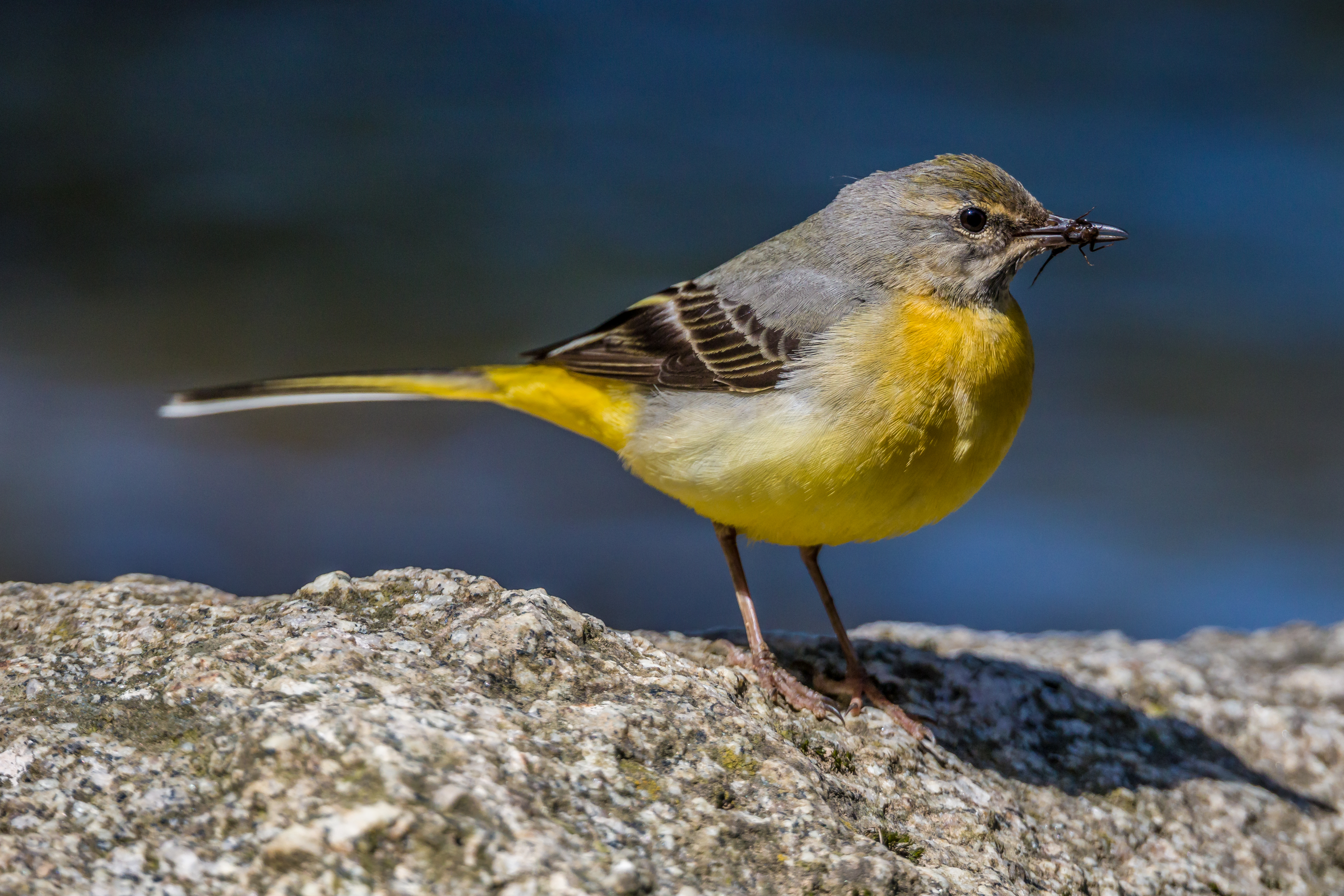
- at Mörlenbach, Hesse, Germany
- Gray wagtail call

Conservation status
- Least Concern (IUCN 3.1)

Scientific classification
- Kingdom: Animalia
- Phylum: Chordata
- Class: Aves
- Order: Passeriformes
- Family: Motacillidae
- Genus: Motacilla
- Species: M. cinerea

Binomial name
- Motacilla cinerea Tunstall, 1771
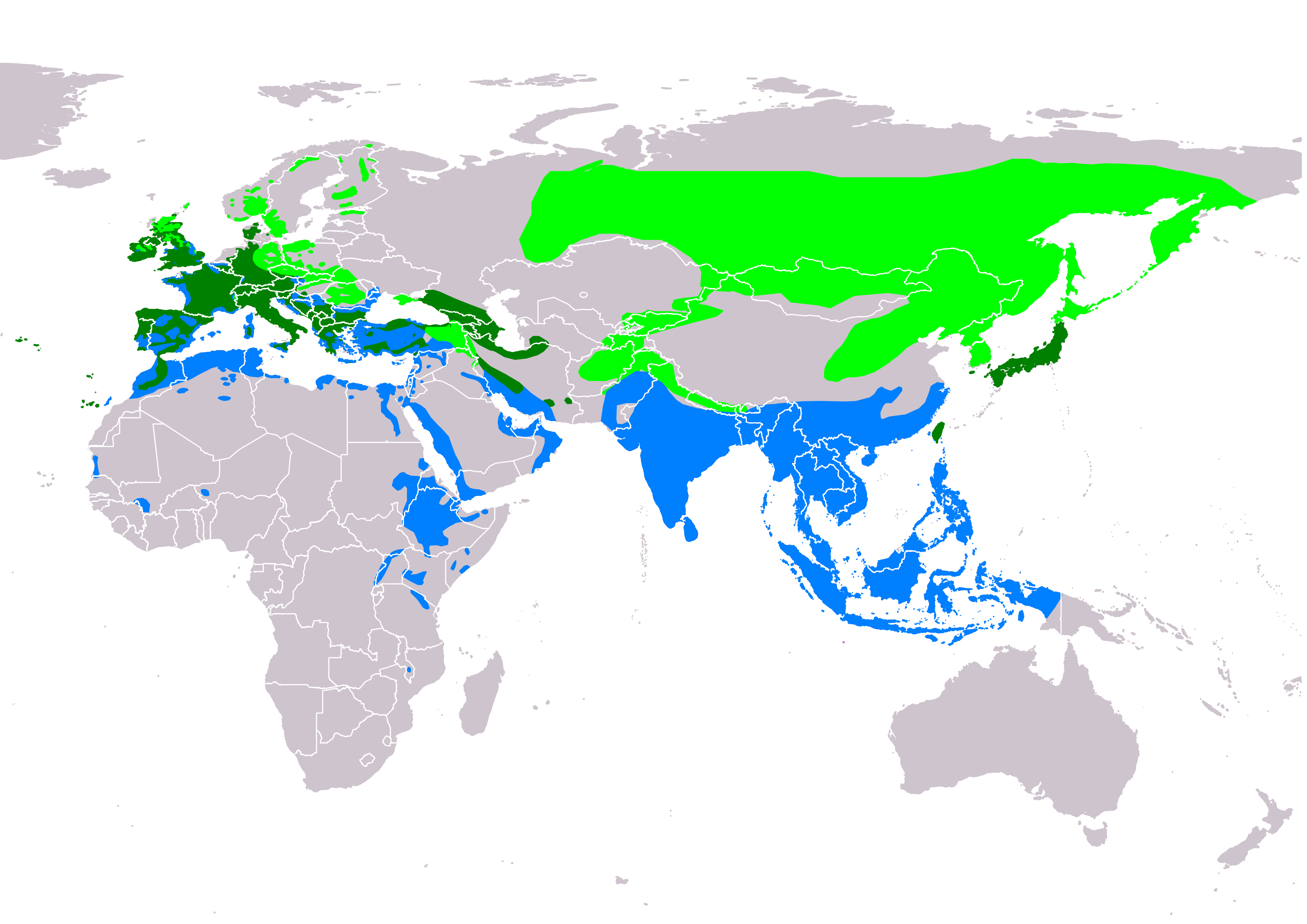
- Range of M. cinerea Extant, breeding Extant, resident Extant, non-breeding

Synonyms
- Motacilla melanope Calobates melanope

= Grey wagtail =

Species of bird

The grey wagtail (Motacilla cinerea) is a member of the wagtail family, Motacillidae, measuring around 18–19 cm overall length. The species looks somewhat similar to the yellow wagtail but has the yellow on its underside restricted to the throat and vent. Breeding males have a black throat. The species is widely distributed, with several populations breeding in Eurosiberia and migrating to tropical regions in Asia and Africa. The species is always associated with running water when breeding, although they may use man-made structures near streams for the nest. Outside the breeding season, they may also be seen around lakes, coasts and other watery habitats. Like other wagtails, they frequently wag their tail and fly low with undulations and they have a sharp call that is often given in flight.

== Taxonomy and systematics ==
The binomial name of the grey wagtail Motacilla cinerea was introduced by Marmaduke Tunstall in his 1771 publication Ornithologia Britannica. Motacilla is the Latin name for the pied wagtail; although actually a diminutive of motare, "to move about", from medieval times it led to the misunderstanding of cilla as "tail". The specific cinerea is Latin for "ash-grey" from cinis, "ashes".

The relationships of this species are not well resolved; it belongs to the non-African clade of wagtails, these are confusing in their external morphology, and mtDNA cytochrome b and NADH dehydrogenase subunit 2 sequence data are not able to robustly resolve their relationships. While the present species is probably most closely related to citrine wagtails and some blue-headed wagtails, the exact nature of this relationship is unclear.

Three subspecies are recognised:

- M. c. patriciae Vaurie, 1957 – Azores
- M. c. schmitzi Tschusi, 1900 – Madeira
- M. c. cinerea Tunstall, 1771 – west Europe, Canary Islands and northwest Africa to central, east, northeast Asia

== Description ==
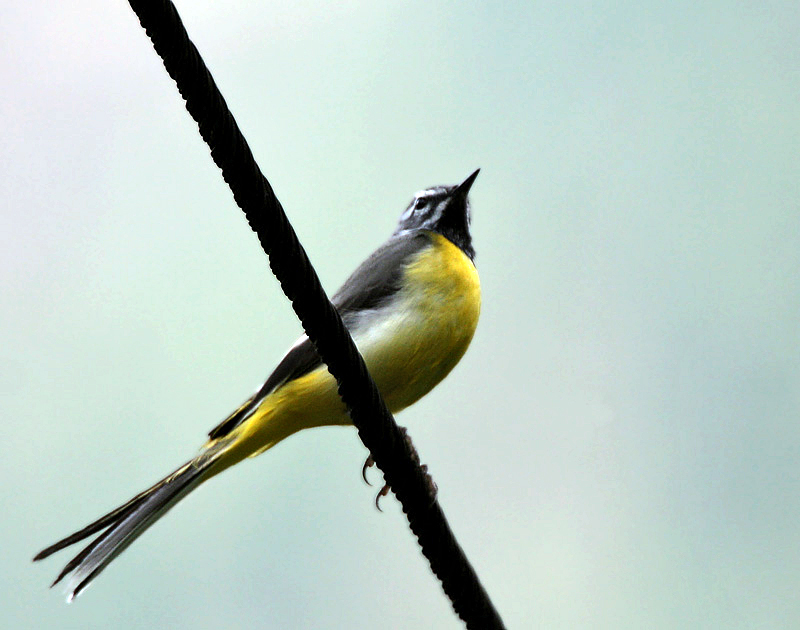
Male M. c. melanope

Grey wagtail in Japan

This slim wagtail has a narrow white supercilium and a broken eye ring. The upperparts are grey and the yellow vent contrasting with whitish underparts makes it distinctive. The breeding male has a black throat that is edged by whitish moustachial stripes. They forage singly or in pairs on meadows or on shallow water marshes. They also use rocks in water and will often perch on trees. They have a clear sharp call note and the song consists of trills.

== Distribution and habitat ==
The bird is widely distributed across the Palearctic region with several well marked populations. The nominate form (includes caspica of Iran, Turkey and the Caucasus) is from western Europe including the British Isles, Scandinavia and Mediterranean region. Race melanope, which is not well separated from the nominate subspecies, is described as the population breeding in eastern Europe and central Asia mainly along the mountain chains of the Urals, Tien Shan and along the Himalayas. They winter in Africa and Asia. Race robusta breeds along the northeastern parts of Asia in Siberia extending to Korea and Japan. These winter in Southeast Asia. Island forms include patriciae of the Azores, schmitzi of Madeira and canariensis of the Canary Islands.

They sometimes occur on the islands to the West of Alaska but have been known to occur further south in California as a vagrant.

== Behaviour and ecology ==
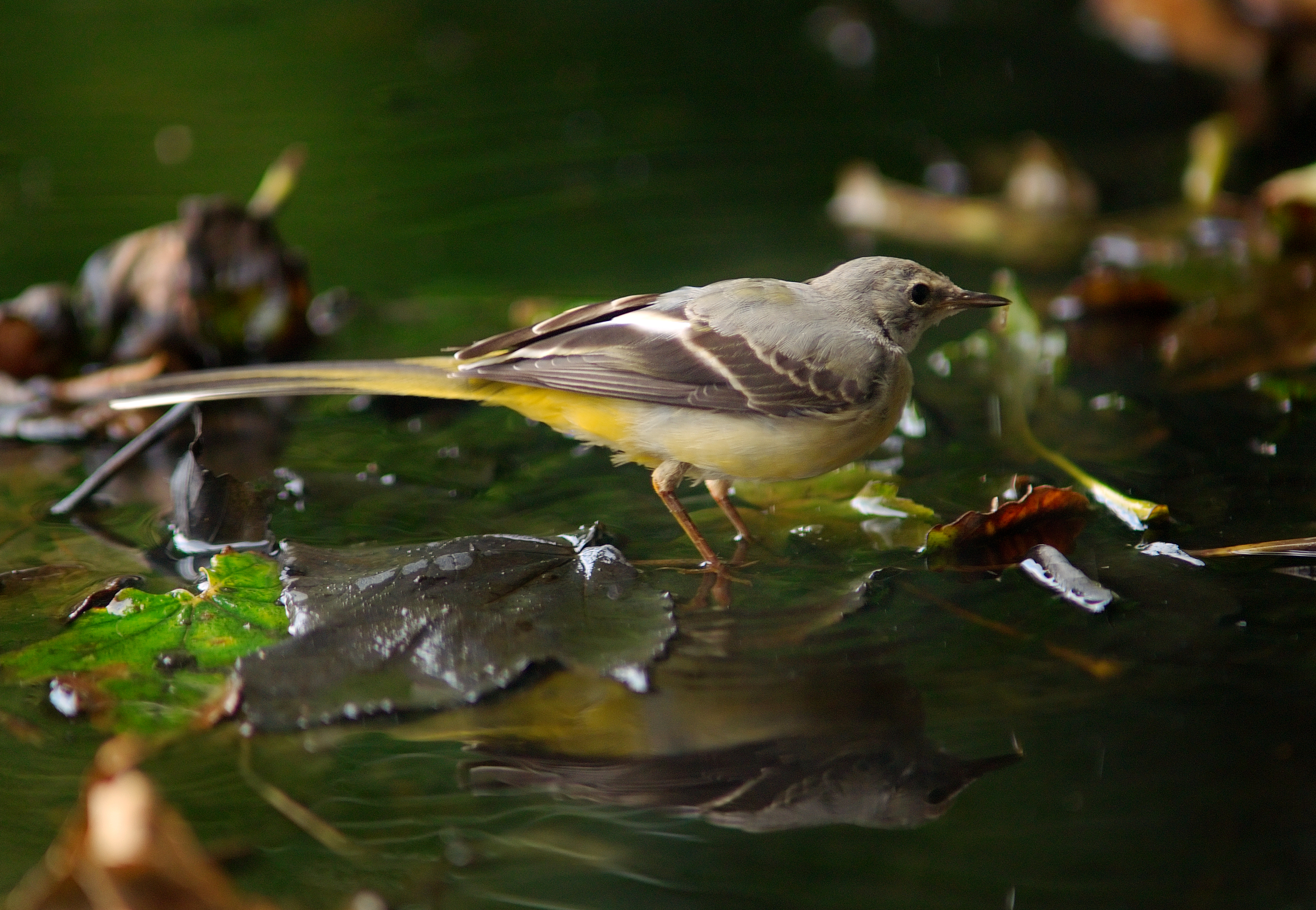
Nominate race (Belgium)

The breeding season is April to July and the nest is placed near fast running streams or rivers on an embankment between stones and roots. The male in display, makes short flights up into the air and descends slowly with fluttering flight accompanied by a rapid series of chipping high notes. In Europe the nests are often made in holes in manmade structures. The clutch consists of 3–6 speckled eggs and multiple broods may be raised with declining numbers in the clutch in subsequent broods. The usual clutch size is five in Ireland and the breeding success is about 80% with predation of eggs or chicks being the main cause of breeding failure. The Canary Islands population typically have smaller clutches and the breeding season is not as short and well marked as in populations at higher latitudes. The incubation period is about two weeks with chicks fledging within a fortnight. They live for a maximum of 8 years in the wild.

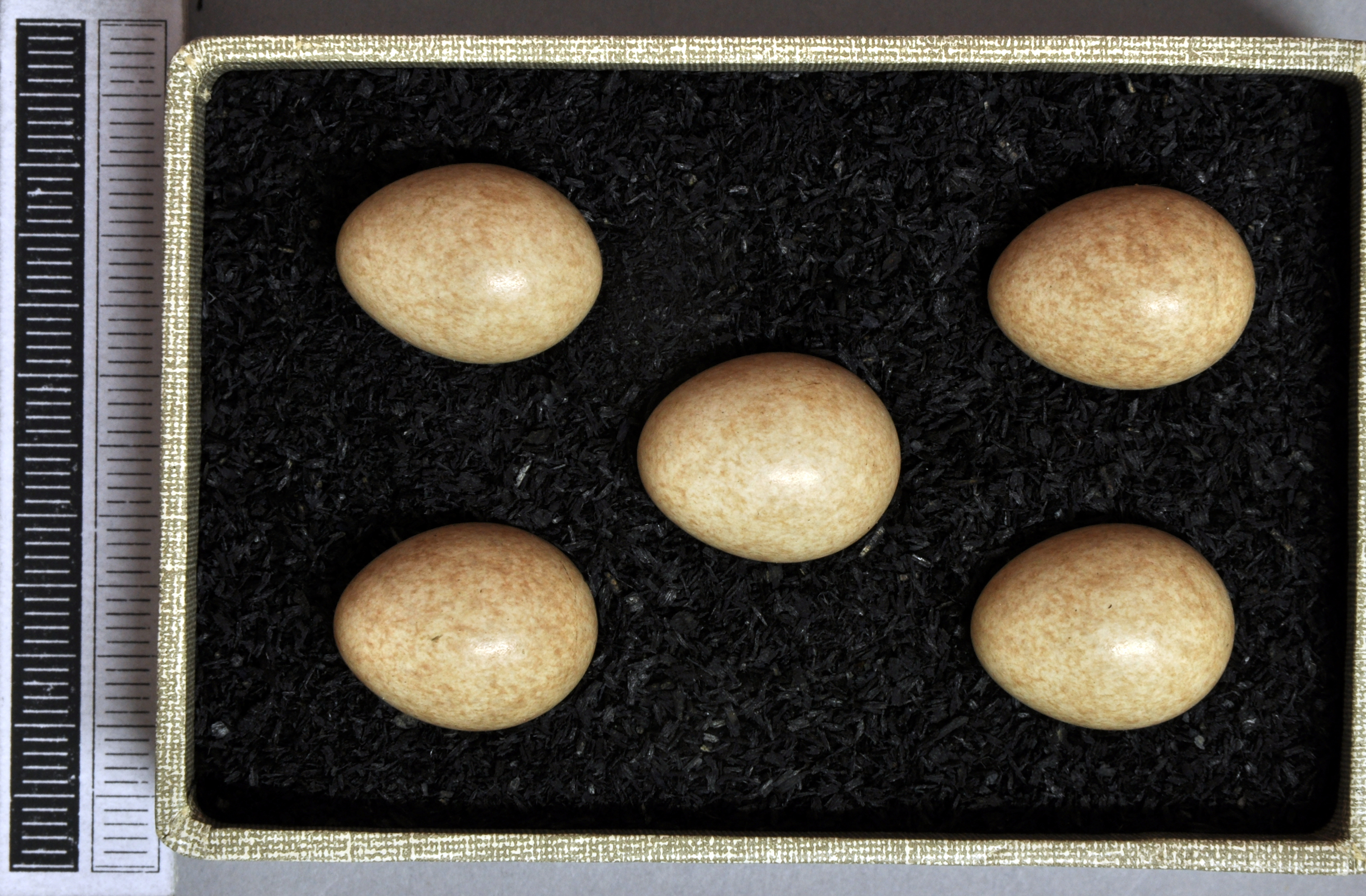
Eggs, Collection Museum Wiesbaden

In some parts of its range the white-throated dipper nests in the same habitats as the grey wagtail and there are some records of interspecific feeding of dipper chicks by adult wagtails.

These birds feed on a variety of aquatic invertebrates including adult flies, mayflies, beetles, crustacea and molluscs. They often forage along roadsides in winter, flushing with a sharp chi-cheep call and flying up further along the road but after some distance turning back to return to the original location.

In winter, they roost in small groups. Wintering birds have been known to return to the same sites, sometimes a small urban garden, each year.

Adults often have parasitic ticks, Ixodes ricinus, which can harbour Borrelia and thus can potentially disperse Lyme disease over a wide region. Coccidia such as Isospora sp. are known in this species. The common cuckoo is sometimes a brood parasite of this species, and kestrels may sometimes prey on them.
