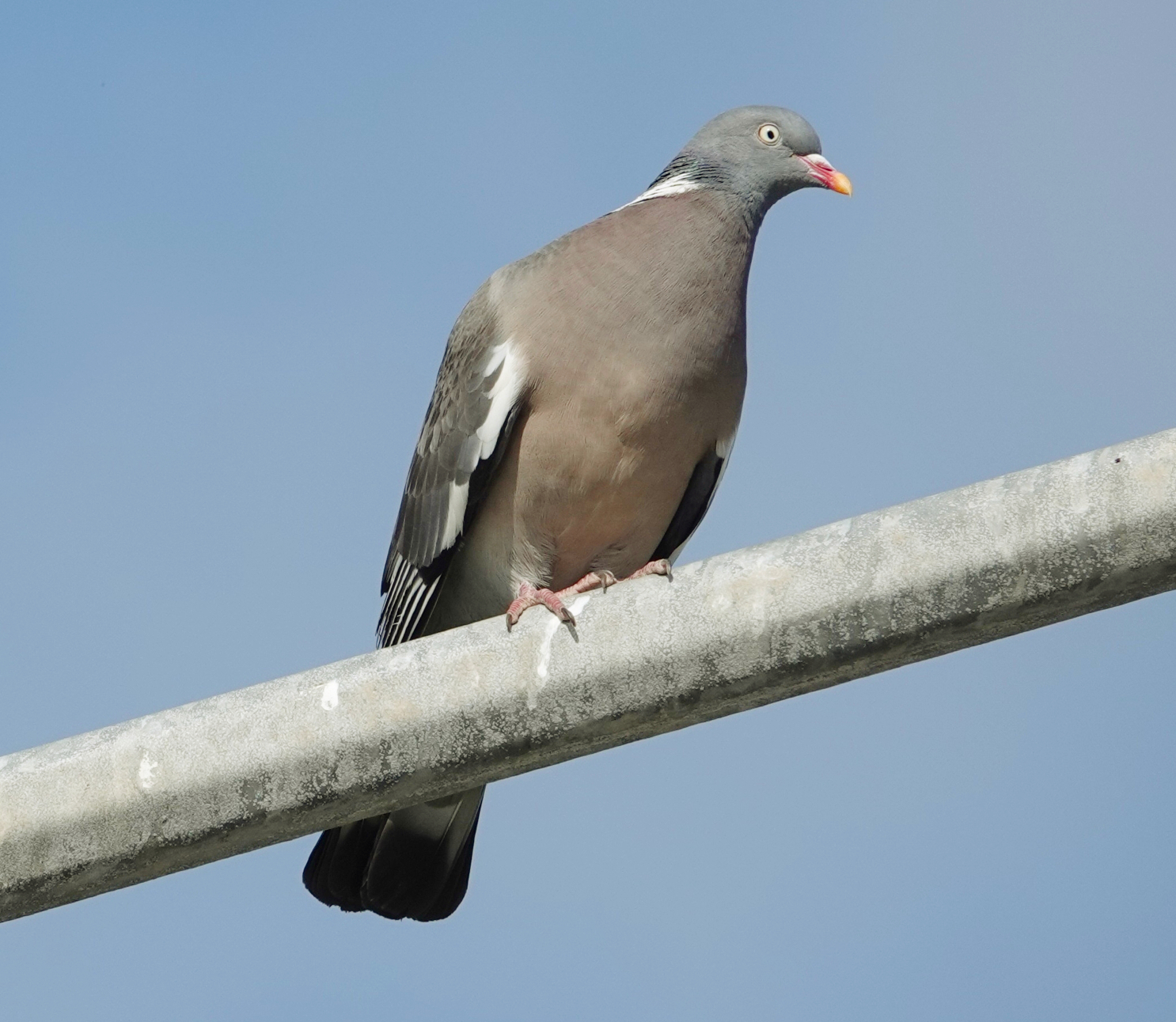

Conservation status
- Endangered (ESA)

Scientific classification
- Kingdom: Animalia
- Phylum: Chordata
- Class: Aves
- Order: Columbiformes
- Family: Columbidae
- Genus: Columba
- Species: C. palumbus
- Subspecies: C. p. azorica

Trinomial name
- Columba palumbus azorica Hartert, 1905

= Azores wood pigeon =

Subspecies of bird

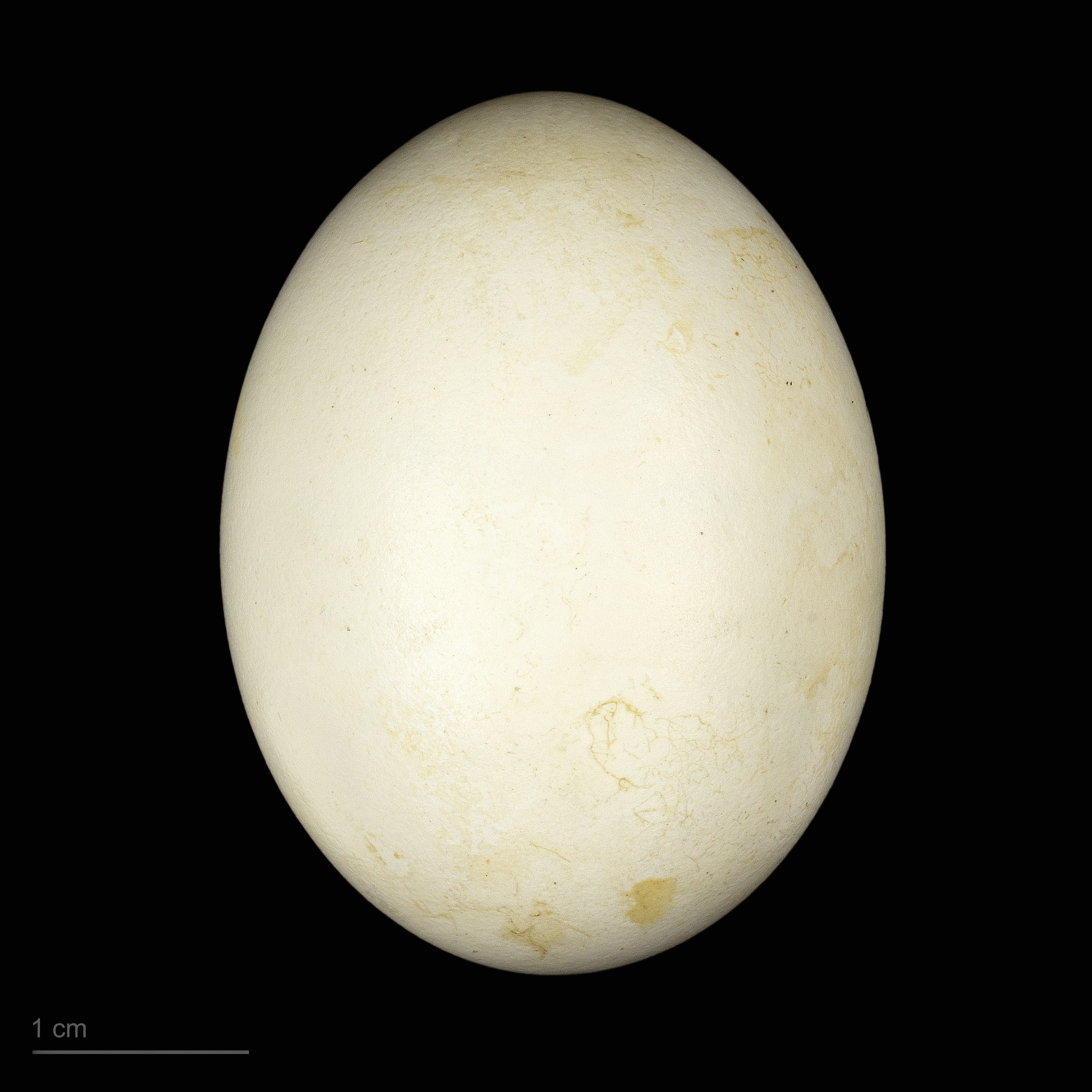
Columba palumbus azorica - MHNT

The Azores wood pigeon (Columba palumbus azorica) (Portuguese: pombo-torcaz-dos-açores) is an endemic subspecies of the common wood pigeon located in the Atlantic Azores islands of Portugal. This endemic subspecies is the only live pigeon present in the laurel forest habitat of the Azores Islands.

== Description ==
The Azores wood pigeon closely resembles the mainland wood pigeons found in Africa. Its plumage is somewhat darker and conspicuous, with slightly brighter colour than the European subspecies (C. p. palumbus), especially on the upper parts and the underwing coverts. The bill is orange to yellow and the colouring is paler at the tip, and the eyes are pale yellow. It has white neck markings and iridescent green and purple patches on the neck and breast. The neck feathers stiffen to form white spots on the sides of the neck, with more extension than the European common wood pigeon, but similar to the Asian wood pigeon (C. p. casiotis). The Azores wood pigeon also has white in the wings and a more extensive green iridescence on the nape. The common wood pigeon may be distinguished from other pigeons by its larger size.

== Ecology ==
It is still present on seven islands, but is extinct on Flores Island. This pigeon shared its habitat with the extinct laurel forest mountain pigeon, or black pigeon (Portuguese: pombo da serra). The extinct species was tamer than the Azores wood pigeon. However, this subspecies is also in danger of disappearing, like the related Madeiran wood pigeon (C. p. maderensis).

The Azores wood pigeon is found mainly in wooded areas. The largest number of breeding members are found in March. Like the other islander race of common wood pigeon and some species of Macaronesian or Pacific Islands wood pigeons, the Azores have a low rate of reproduction, less than the common wood pigeon. The Azores wood pigeon lays 1-2 white eggs.

In 2003, seven of the nine islands of the Azores were surveyed. The survey gave density estimates of 14.52 birds/km^{2} on Terceira and 5.14 birds/km^{2} on the other six islands. Azores wood pigeon densities in the Azores were still much lower than those of the common wood pigeon in mainland Europe. Populations in the Azores may now be limited by the availability of breeding habitat and over-winter food supply. There are strong differences between wood pigeon abundance on the different islands of the archipelago, notably with densities on the island of Terceira being higher than on any of the other islands. In 1905, The German ornithologist Ernst Hartert identified it as a subspecies.

Azores wood pigeons play an important ecological role; they are the only birds in the area capable of eating the larger native drupes of the laurel forest species, and disperse the seeds. Its numbers fell sharply after human colonisation of the archipelago and it vanished altogether from some of the islands. The major cause of its population decline was habitat loss from forest clearance, but hunting and nest predation by introduced species like rats, were also contributory factors. Any intrusion of humans or animals such as dogs and cats can cause great concern in the nesting population. The black rat is a species that climbs trees in search of food and assaults birds' nests causing, at least, the abandonment of eggs and ruination of the breeding season.

== Endangered ==
The Azores wood pigeon is endangered. Protection of the laurel forests and an effective ban on hunting enabled an increase in numbers.

This species has a greater dependence on water than other species of pigeon. It inhabits beaches and islands in the evergreen broadleaf forest, Macaronesian laurisilva, dense subtropical forest and warm temperate evergreen broadleaf forests. It is heavily dependent on a mature forest, whose seeds are dispersed by the birds. Also it feeds in pastures and farmland, in cultivated land and tilled land. It is present inland on Terceira especially on the west coast and near Lagoa da Junco. There are a few specimens in São Miguel near Lagoa Azul.

The species has virtually disappeared due to de-forestation. The breeding area is found only near bodies of fresh water with dense tree cover, where couples can nest. Diet changes seasonally as the availability of fruit fluctuates. Leaves can comprise the major part of the diet at certain times of the year, especially when there is little fruit available. The bird browses on leaves and buds, especially during breeding. It prefers foliage and buds at the tips of the branches. They eat rounded and fleshy young leaves, leaves from genus Prunus, young shoots from Asteraceae, Caryophyllaceae, and Brassicaceae (Cruciferae).

== Taxonomy ==
The genus Columba is the largest within the pigeon family, and has the widest distribution. Its members are typically pale grey or brown, often with white head or neck markings or iridescent green or purple patches on the neck and breast. The neck feathers may be stiffened and aligned to form grooves. One of several subgroups within Columba consists of the widespread Eurasian common wood pigeon, Bolle's pigeon, the trocaz pigeon, and the African Afep pigeon. Two Macaronesian endemic pigeons, Bolle's and trocaz, are thought to be derived from isolated island populations of C. palumbus.

The Atlantic archipelagos of the Canary Islands, Azores, and Madeira have a volcanic origin and have never been part of a continent. At various times in the past, the major islands of these archipelagos were all colonised by ancestral wood pigeons, which evolved on their respective islands in isolation from the mainland populations. One of these was the lineage of extinct species laurel forest mountain pigeon or Azores black pigeon (Portuguese: pombo da serra). Mitochondrial and nuclear DNA sequences suggest that the ancestor of Bolle's pigeon may have arrived in the Canary Islands about 5 mya. An older lineage gave rise to another Canarian endemic, the laurel pigeon, C. junoniae, may date from 20 mya.

The trocaz pigeon was recognised as a different species from the other local form, the now-extinct Madeiran wood pigeon, the two local pigeons never interbred or habitually associated together. The trocaz pigeon is a monotypic species, although in the past Bolle's pigeon was sometimes regarded as a subspecies of the trocaz pigeon.

The most recent common wood pigeon arrival came from a European or African subspecies, giving rise to the subspecies C. p. maderensis, on Madeira and C. p. azorica in the Azores islands.
