= Cuthbert Constable =

English physician and antiquary (c. 1680–1746)

Cuthbert Constable (c. 1680 – 27 March 1746), born Cuthbert Tunstall, was an English physician and antiquary, "the Catholic Maecenas of his age".

== Life ==
He was the son of Francis Tunstall of Wycliffe Hall, Yorkshire, England, and Cicely, daughter of John Constable, second Viscount Dunbar. When in 1718 he succeeded, on the death of his uncle, the last Viscount Dunbar, to the estates of Burton Constable, he legally changed his surname from Tunstall to Constable. He was educated at Douai and subsequently studied medicine at Montpellier, where he took the doctor of medicine degree.

He formed a large collection of books and manuscripts at Burton Constable, and in other ways was a constant patron of Catholic literature, assisting Bishop Richard Challoner by lending him documents for the Memoirs of Missionary Priests, and Charles Dodd, by contributing to the expenses of the History of the Church of England. He also maintained friendly relations with non-Catholic scholars; and among the Burton Constable papers are two volumes of his correspondence with Francis Nicholson (1650–1731), a Catholic convert, formerly of University College, Oxford, and the well-known antiquary, Thomas Hearne. His correspondence with the former was chiefly concerned with particulars for the biography of Abraham Woodhead, for whom he had a great veneration.

== Writings ==
His only publication is a life of Woodhead prefixed to his edition of The Third Part of the Brief Account of Church Government, written by that author (London, 1736). Gillow states that even this was largely taken from Nicholson, but is valuable for the complete Woodhead bibliography. The other works enumerated by Gillow are not by Constable, but were manuscripts in his collection. The collection itself was sold by auction in 1889, some of the manuscripts being purchased by Lord Herries and added to his collection at Everingham.

Constable was twice married, first to Amy, daughter of Hugh Clifford, 2nd Baron Clifford of Chudleigh, by whom he had three children, William, Cicely, and Winifred, and secondly to Elizabeth Heneage, by whom he had one son, Marmaduke, who inherited the estate of Wycliffe and resumed the family name of Tunstall.
