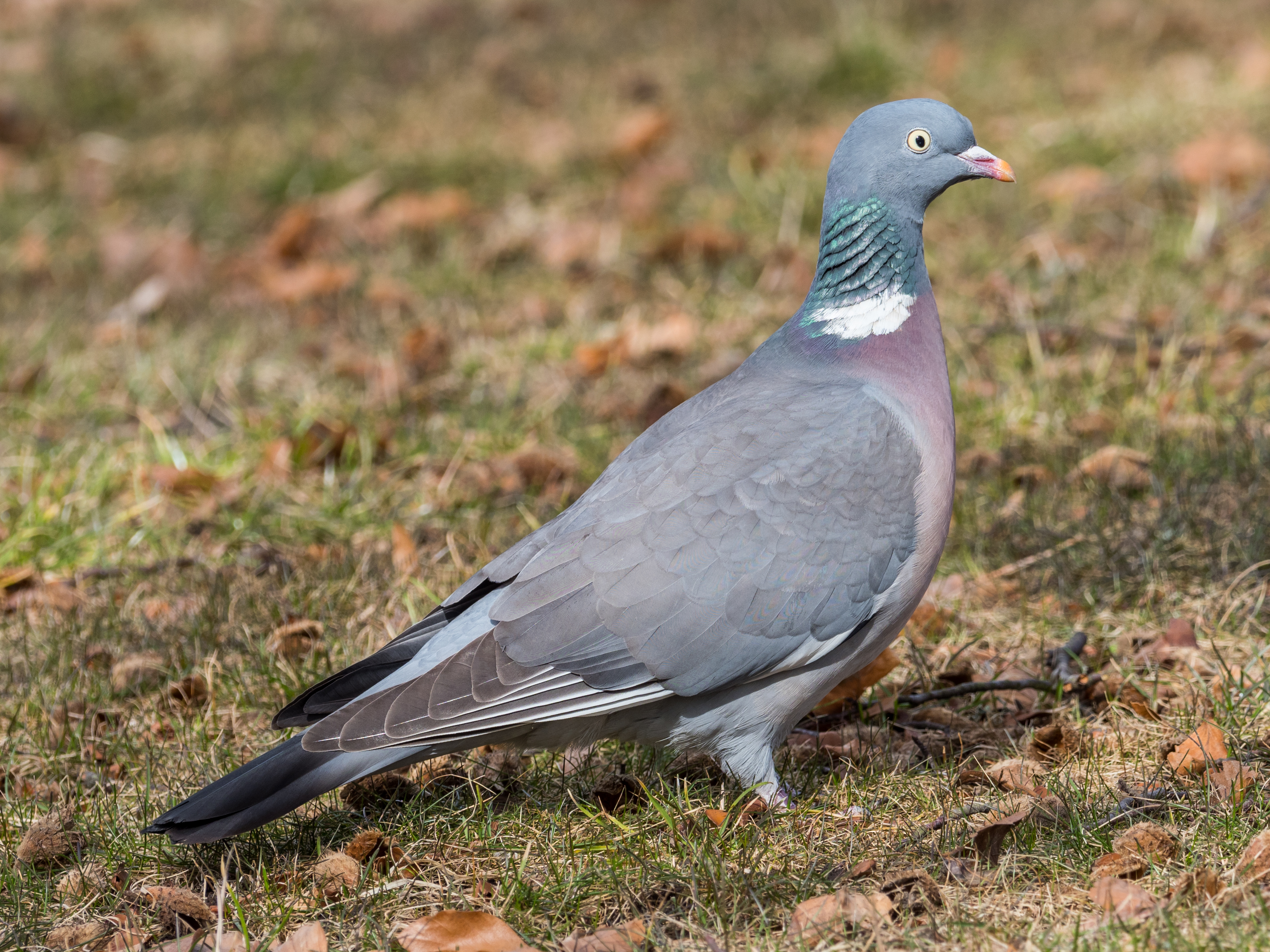
- in Vaxholm, Sweden

Conservation status
- Least Concern (IUCN 3.1)

Scientific classification
- Kingdom: Animalia
- Phylum: Chordata
- Class: Aves
- Order: Columbiformes
- Family: Columbidae
- Genus: Columba
- Species: C. palumbus

Binomial name
- Columba palumbus Linnaeus, 1758
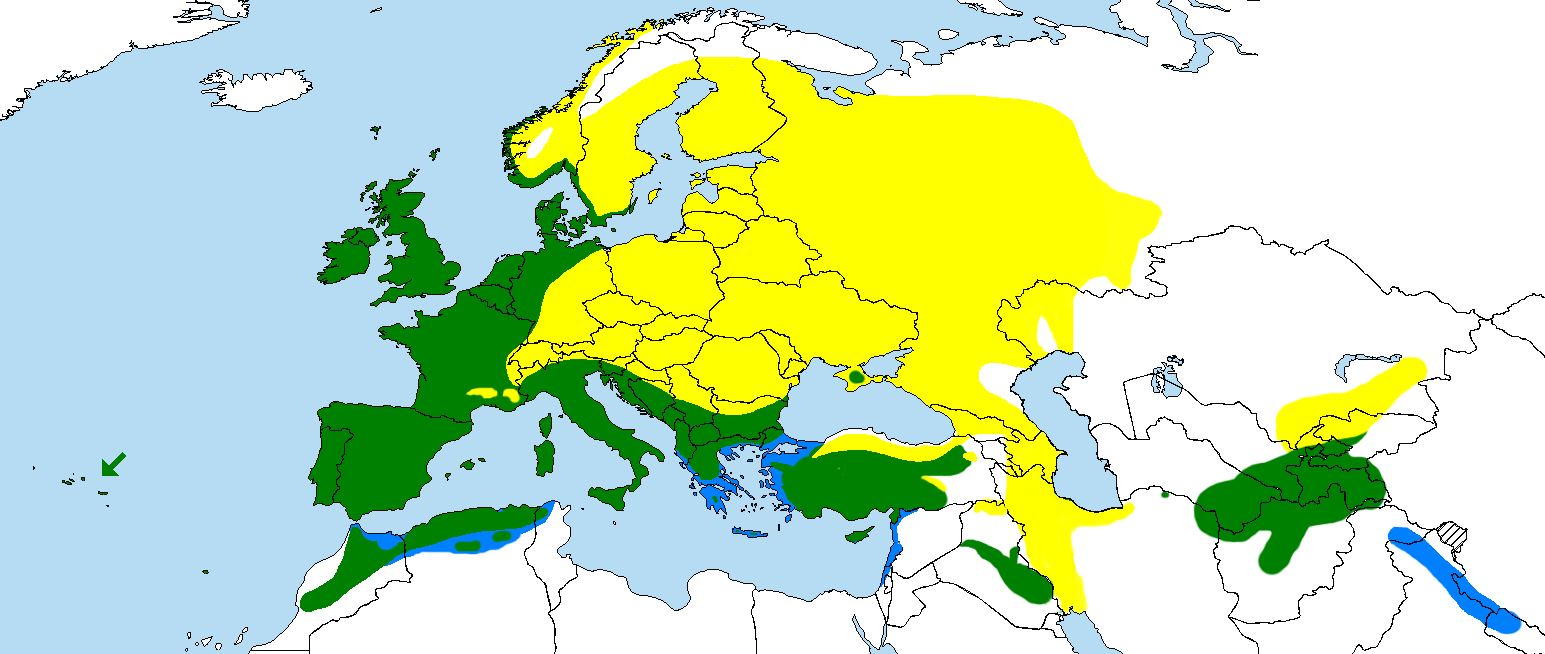
- Global range Breeding summer visitor Breeding resident Non-breeding winter visitor

Audio
- Song

= Common wood pigeon =

Common wood pigeon Temporal range: Middle Pleistocene–Recent

Species of large, white/green-naped, arboreal bird of Eurasia

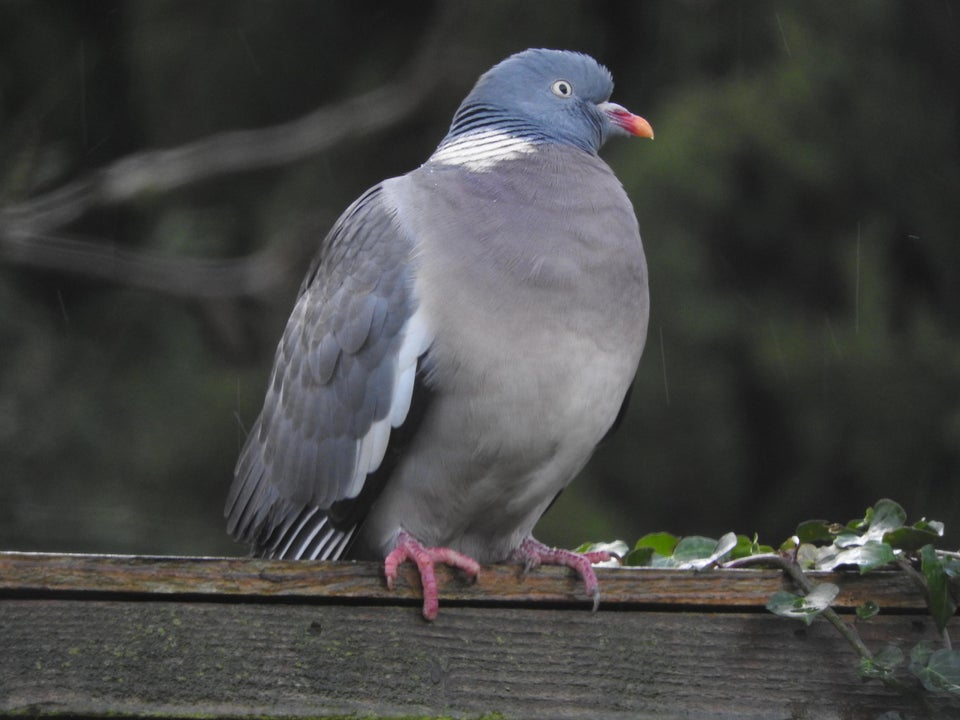
Common wood pigeon perched on a fence. Photograph taken in Cambridge, England

The common wood pigeon (Columba palumbus), also known simply as the wood pigeon, is a large pigeon (Columbidae) native to the Western Palaearctic. It belongs to the genus Columba, which includes closely related species such as the rock dove (Columba livia) though unlike the rock dove, it prefers woodland and commonly perches in trees. The species has a flexible diet, feeding mainly on plant material, including cereals, and is therefore considered an agricultural pest. Wood pigeons are extensively hunted over much of their range, but this does not appear to have a major impact on their population numbers.

== Taxonomy ==
The common wood pigeon was formally described by the Swedish naturalist Carl Linnaeus in 1758 in the tenth edition of his Systema Naturae. He placed it with all the other pigeons in the genus Columba and coined the binomial name Columba palumbus, still in use today. The specific epithet palumbus is an alternate form of the Latin palumbes for a wood pigeon.

Five subspecies are recognised, one of which is now extinct:

- C. p. palumbus Linnaeus, 1758 – Europe to western Siberia and Iraq; Northwest Africa
- †C. p. maderensis Tschusi, 1904 – Madeira (extinct)
- C. p. azorica Hartert, 1905 – the eastern and central Azores
- C. p. iranica (Zarudny, 1910) – southwestern and northern Iran to southwestern Turkmenistan
- C. p. casiotis (Bonaparte, 1854) – southeastern Iran and Kazakhstan to western China, northwestern India and Nepal

Fossils of the species are recorded from the early Middle Pleistocene of Sicily.

== Description ==
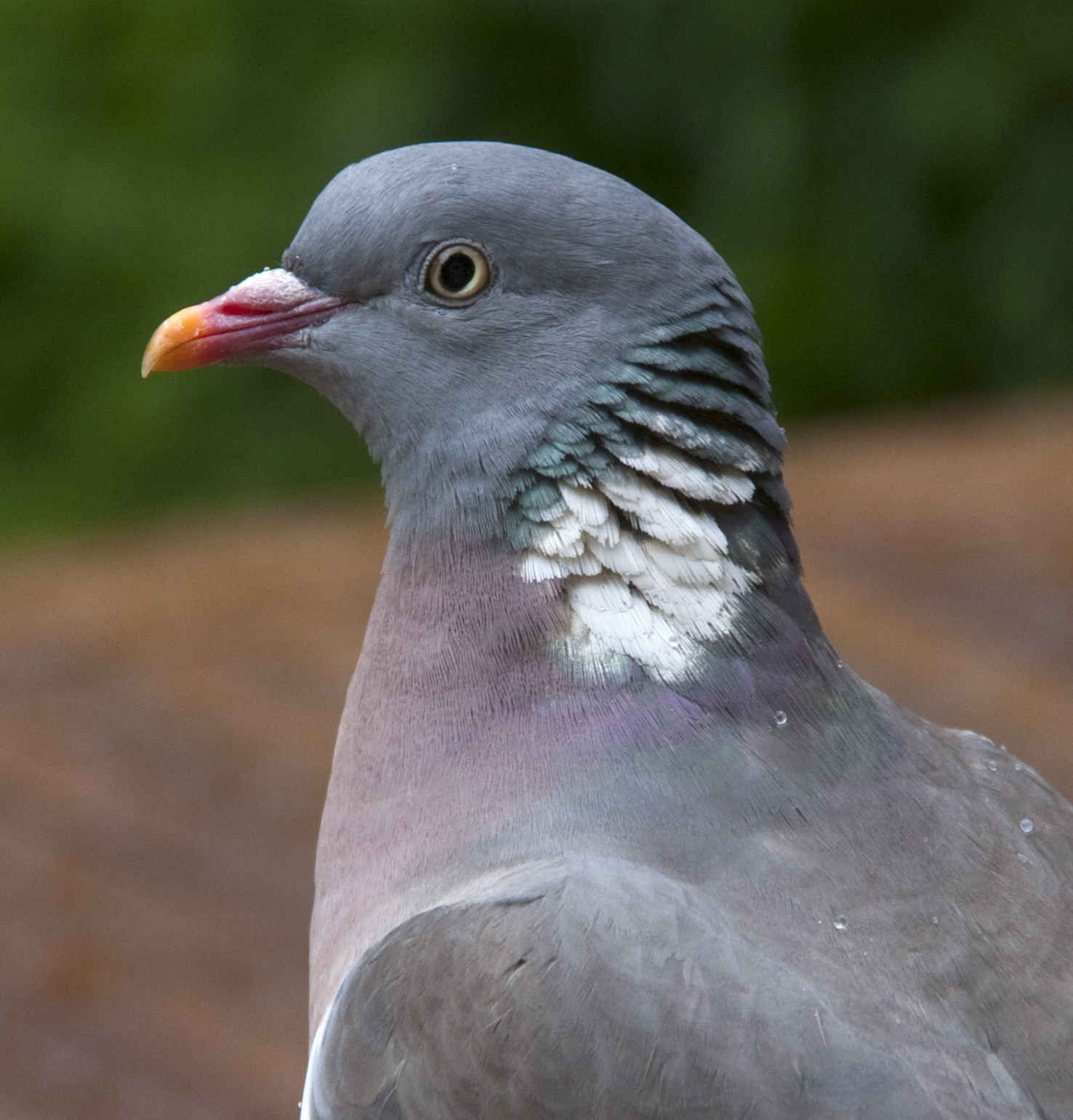
Adult common wood pigeon, photograph taken in Birmingham, England

The three Western European Columba pigeons, common wood pigeon, stock dove and rock dove, though superficially alike, have very distinctive characteristics; the common wood pigeon may be identified at once by its larger size at 38–44.5 cm (15–17 1/2 in) and weight 300–615 g (10 5/8–21 3/4 oz), and the white plumage on its neck and wing. It is otherwise a basically grey bird, with a pinkish breast. The wingspan can range from 68 to 80 cm (27 to 31 in) and the wing chord measures 24 to 25.4 cm (9 1/2 to 10 in). The tail measures 13.8 to 15 cm (5 1/2 to 6 in), the beak is 1.9 to 2.2 cm (3/4 to 7/8 in) and the tarsus is 2.5 to 2.8 cm (1 to 1 1/8 in). Adult birds bear a series of green and white patches on their necks, and a pink patch on their chest. The eye colour is a pale yellow, in contrast to that of rock doves, which is orange-red, and the stock dove, which is dark grey-brown to black.

Juveniles lack the white patches on either side of the neck. When they are around six months old (about three months after leaving the nest), they develop small white patches on either side of the neck. These gradually increase in size until they are fully formed when the bird is about 6–8 months of age. Juveniles also have a greyer bill and an overall lighter grey appearance than adults.

=== Calls ===
The call of the wood pigeon is a monotonous five-syllable characteristic cooing phrase, "oooh, oooh, ooh, ooooh, ooh", usually repeated several times. In Ireland and the UK, the traditional mnemonic for this repeated cooing phrase has been interpreted as "Take two cows, Teddy", or "Take two cows, Taffy". Other interpretations include "I am a pigeon", "My toe bleeds, Betty", and "I don't want to go". However the whole call begins and ends part-way through the mnemonic phrase, thus: "two cows Teddy, take two cows Teddy, take two cows Teddy, take".

== Distribution and habitat ==
In the colder northern and eastern parts of the Western Palaearctic the common wood pigeon is a migrant, but in southern and western Europe it is a well distributed and often abundant resident. In Great Britain wood pigeons are commonly seen in parks and gardens and are increasingly seen in towns and cities. In May 2019, a single wood pigeon was sighted in La Romaine, Quebec, Canada, making it the only known record of the species in the Americas.

== Biology ==
A flock of common wood pigeons feeding in a field

Like many species of pigeon, wood pigeons use trees and buildings to gain a vantage point over their surroundings, and their distinctive call means that they are usually heard before they are seen. Its flight is fast and regular, with the occasional sharp flick of the wing flaps characteristic of pigeons. It takes off with a loud clatter. It perches well and, during its nuptial display, it walks along a horizontal branch with its neck swelled, its wings down and its tail outstretched. During the display flight, the bird climbs, and its wings crack smartly like a whip as the bird glides down on stiff wings. The common wood pigeon is gregarious, often forming very large flocks outside the breeding season.

Wood pigeons are known to be fiercely territorial and will fight each other for access to nesting and roosting sites. Typically, male wood pigeons use threat displays and pursuit to deter competitors, but they will also engage in direct confrontation by jumping and striking their rival with both wings.

Most of its diet consists of plant matter, round and fleshy leaves from Caryophyllaceae, Asteraceae, and cruciferous vegetables taken from open fields or gardens and lawns. Young shoots and seedlings are favoured, as well as grain, pine nuts, and certain fruits and berries. In the autumn they also eat figs and acorns, and buds of trees and bushes in winter. They will also eat ants, larvae, and small worms. They need open water to drink from and bathe in. Young common wood pigeons quickly become fat, as a result of the crop milk fed to them by their parents. This is an extremely rich fluid that is produced in the adult birds' crops during the breeding season.

=== Breeding ===
It breeds in trees in woodlands, parks and gardens, laying two white eggs in a simple stick nest. The eggs hatch after 17 to 19 days. Wood pigeons seem to prefer trees near roads and rivers. During the breeding season, males display aggressive behaviour towards each other by jumping and flapping their wings. Their plumage, especially on the head, becomes much darker during hot summer periods. They can breed throughout the year if food is plentiful, but the main breeding season is usually between April and October.

The nests are vulnerable to attack, particularly from crows, jays, and magpies, but also from stoats, and invasive brown rats and gray squirrels. The young usually fly at 33 to 34 days, but if the nest is disturbed, some young may be able to survive having left the nest as early as 20 days after hatching.

In a study carried out using ring-recovery data, the survival rate for juveniles in their first year was 52 per cent, and the annual survival rate for adults was 61 per cent. For birds that survive the first year the typical lifespan is therefore only three years, but the maximum recorded age is 19 years and 8.5 months for a bird ringed and recovered in Cambridgeshire.

Breeding wood pigeons
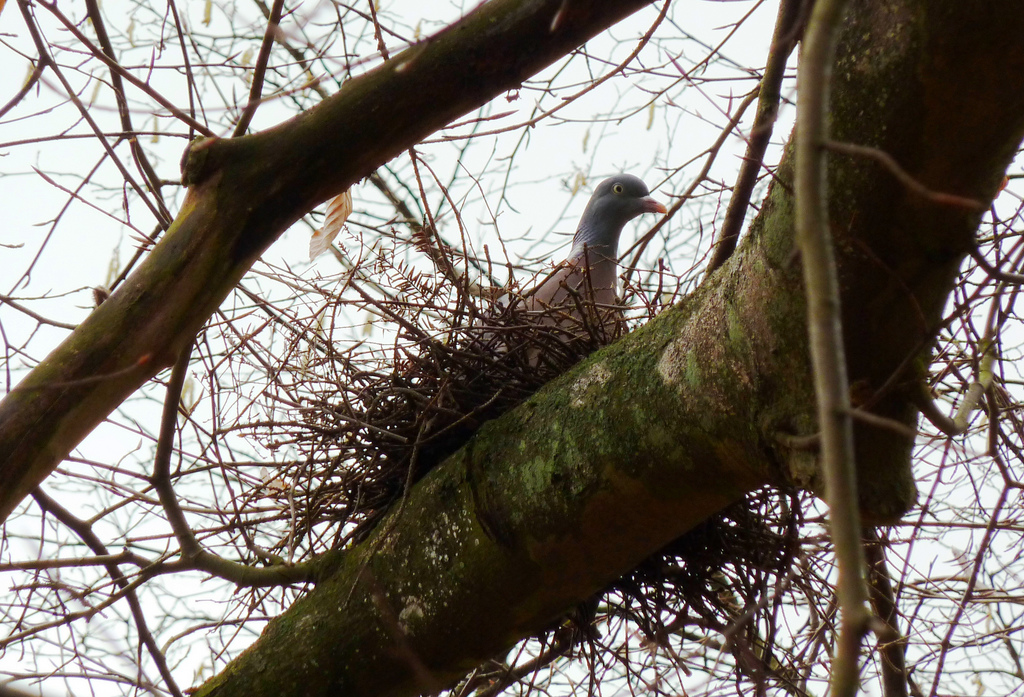
Adult sitting on its nest in a tree

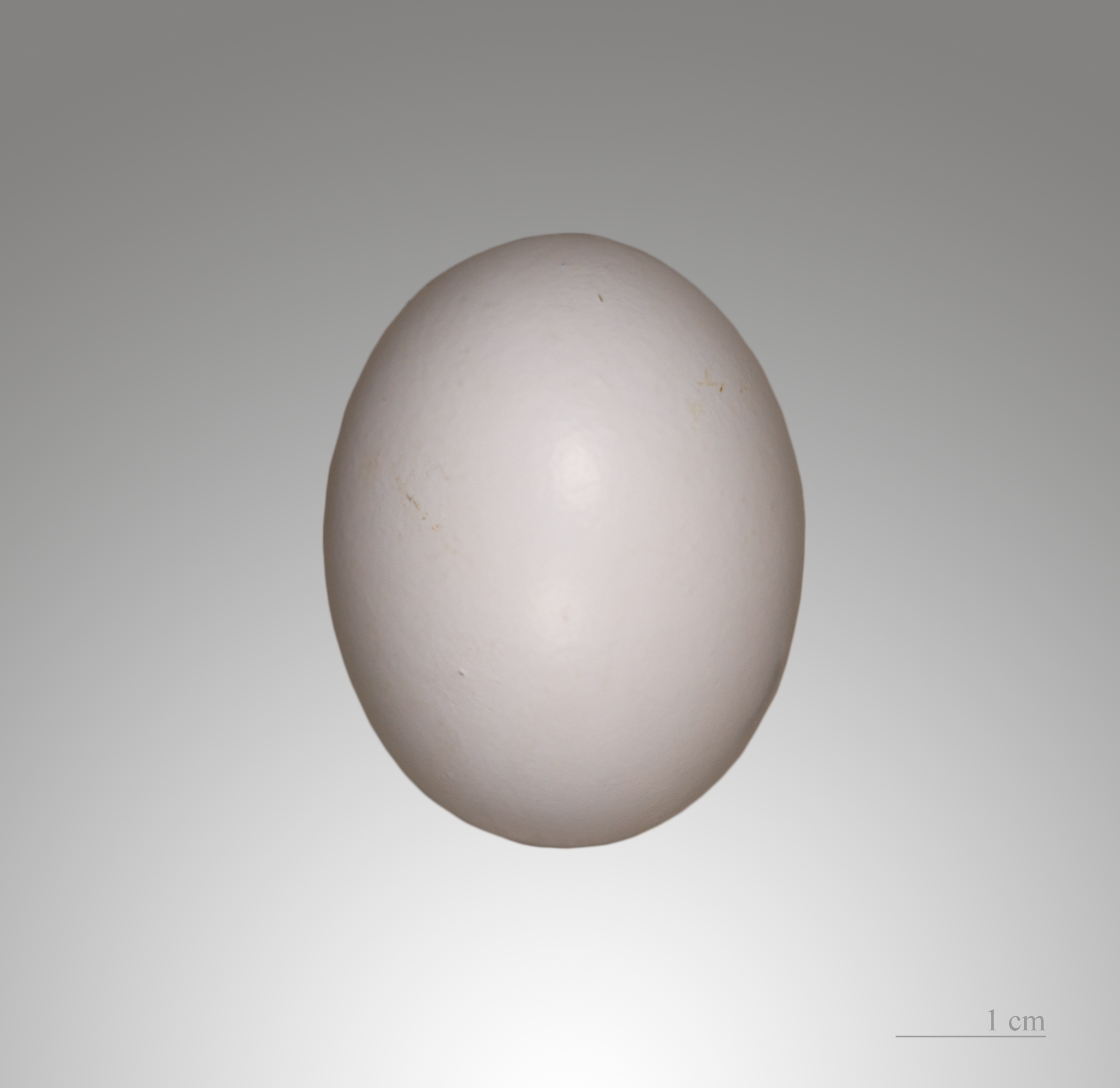
Egg

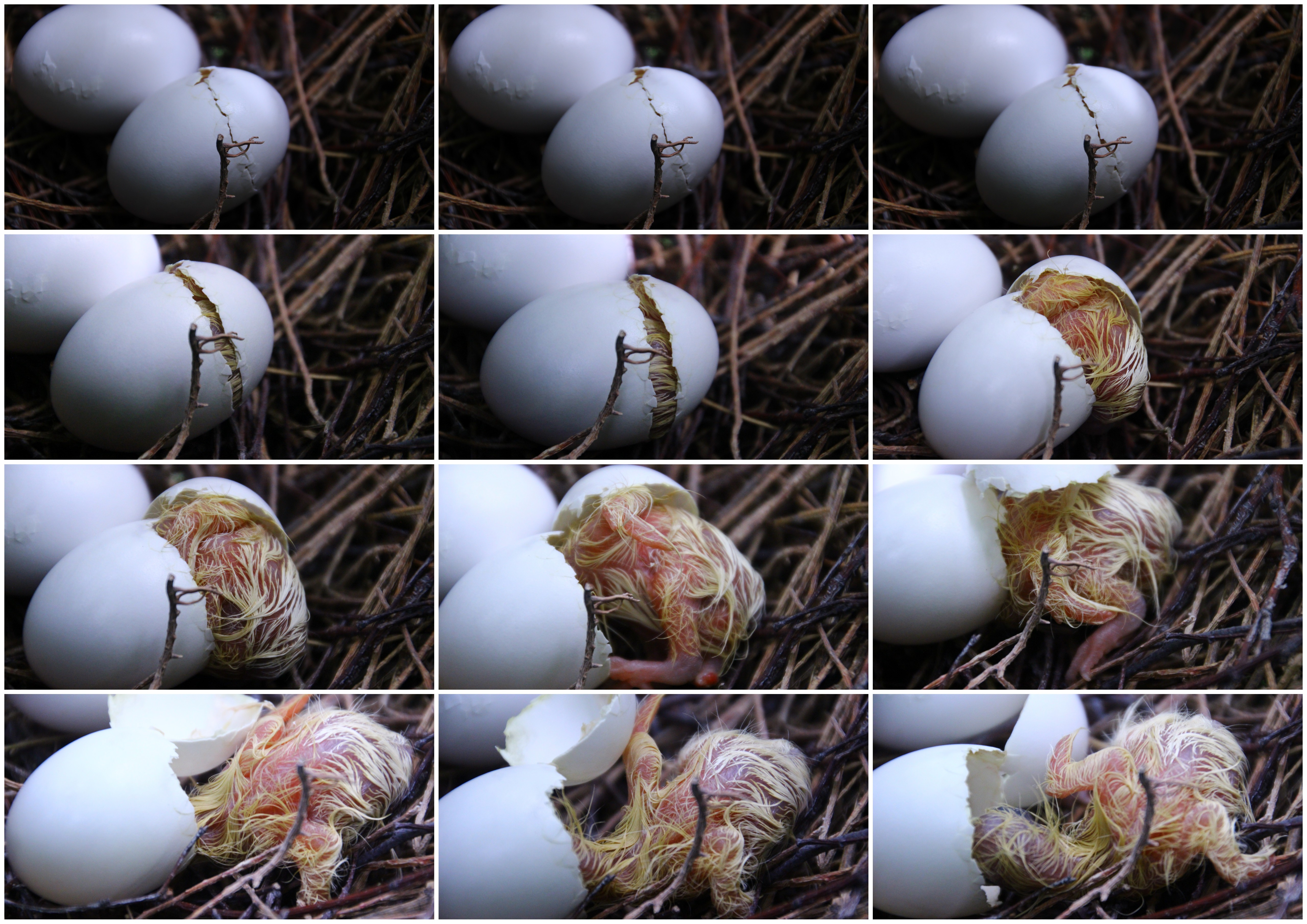
Hatching of a common wood pigeon

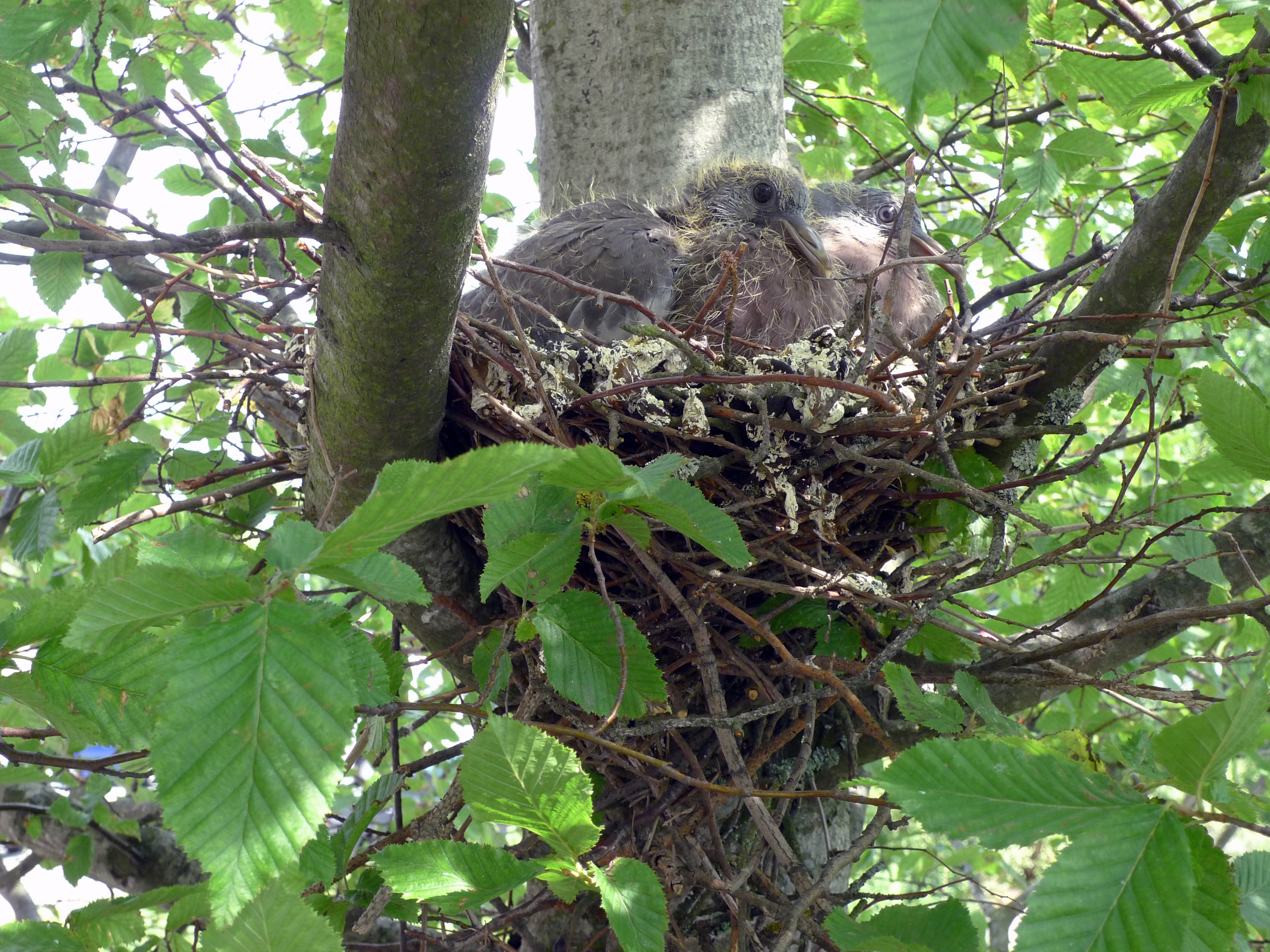
Two young Columba palumbus in a nest

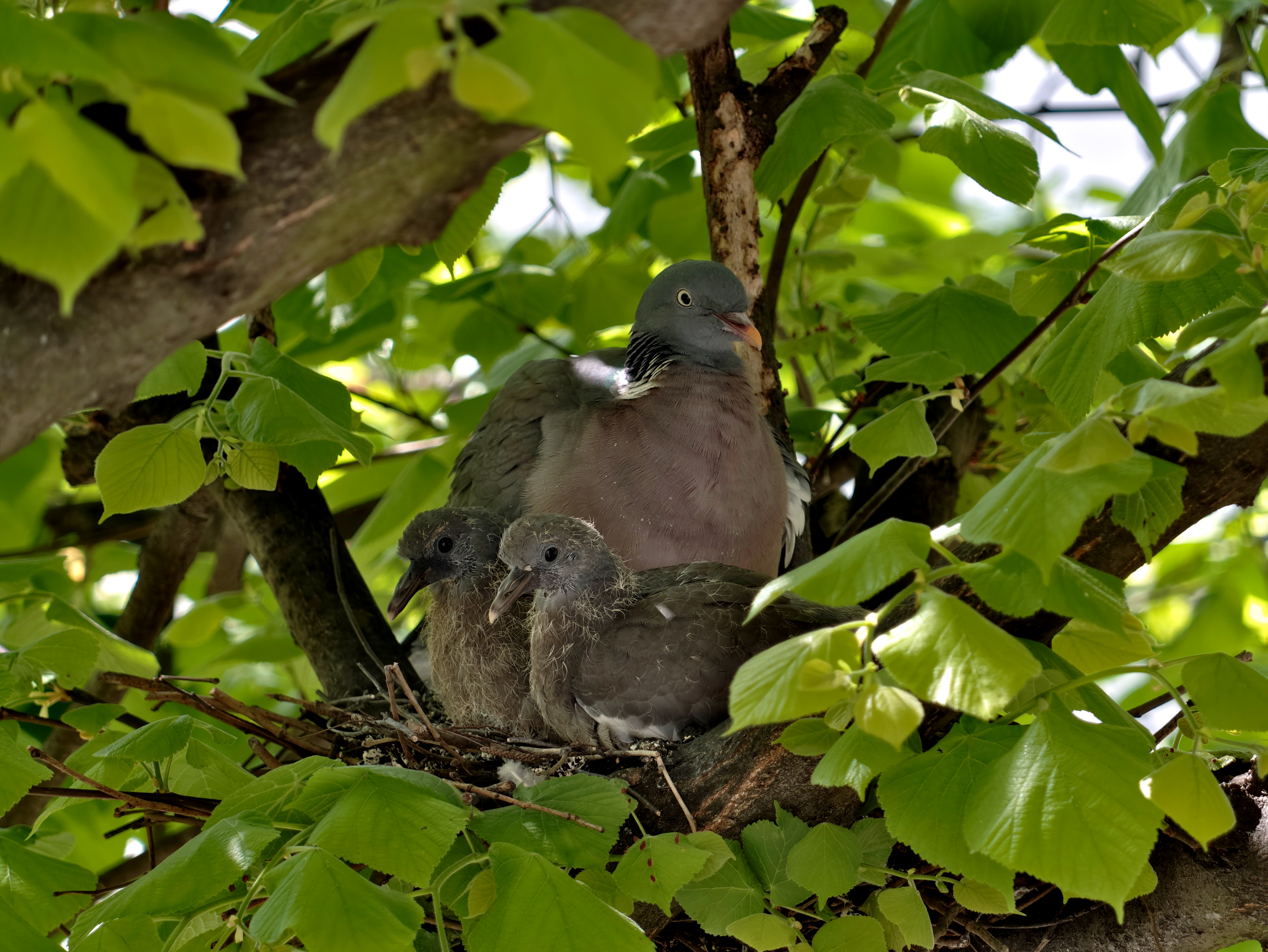
Common wood pigeon with two squabs in the nest

=== Predators ===
Predators of the wood pigeon typically include avivorous birds such as the Eurasian sparrowhawk (Accipiter nisus), Eurasian goshawk (Astur gentilis), peregrine falcon (Falco peregrinus), but domestic cats are also known to prey on fledged birds. The eggs and young of wood pigeons are also often predated by corvids.

== Relation to humans ==
Wood pigeons in urban areas can become exceptionally tame, even more so than feral pigeons. They allow and respond positively to close contact, including stroking and petting, with individuals they have learnt to trust.

=== Hunting ===
This species can be an agricultural pest, and it is frequently hunted, being a legal quarry species in most European countries due to its attack of crops, especially cereals. As a result, it is often wary in rural areas, but may be quite tame where it is not persecuted. The wood pigeon is extensively hunted over much of its range, with millions of birds being shot each year. In 1953, the British government introduced a subsidy to cover the cost of cartridges for wood pigeon hunters, which was abolished in 1969.

=== In culture ===
The wood pigeon is mentioned several times in the Eclogues written by the ancient Roman poet Virgil. Referring to its distinctive husky call, Virgil writes in Eclogue 1;

Here beneath high rocks
The gatherers of leaves, with cheerful songs
Fill the high winds. Meanwhile thy turtle doves
And hoarse wood pigeons from the lofty elms

Make endless moan.
