= Burton Constable Hall =

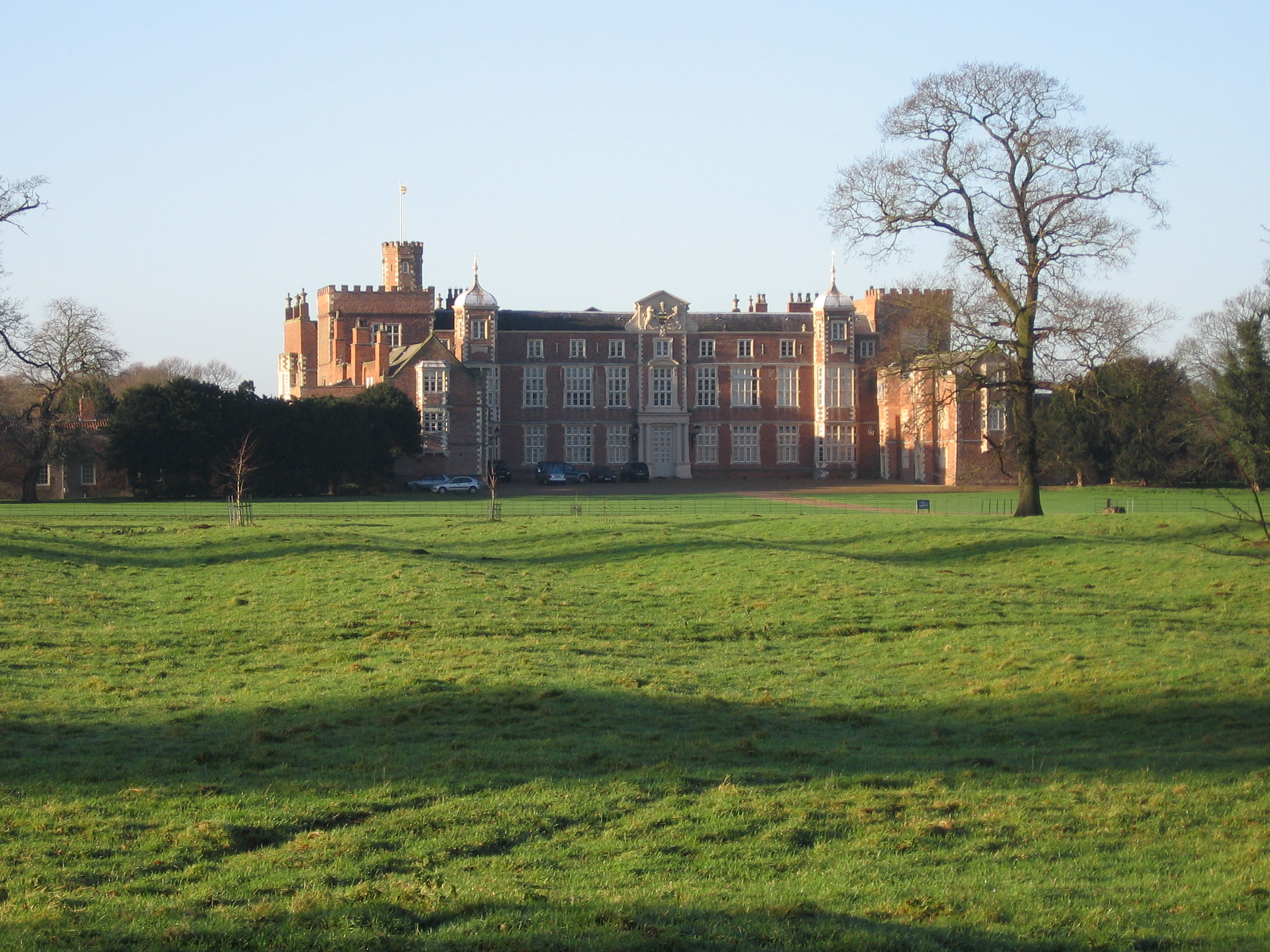
- Burton Constable Hall

- Location of Burton Constable Hall in the East Riding of Yorkshire
- 53°48′49″N 0°11′46″W
- Type: Prodigy house
- Location: East Riding of Yorkshire
- OS grid reference: TA 18871 36784

History
- Built for: Sir John Constable

Site notes
- Architectural styles: Elizabethan (exterior) and Georgian (interior)
- Owner: Constable family
- Website: burtonconstable.com

Listed Building – Grade I
- Official name: Burton Constable Hall
- Designated: 4 March 1952
- Reference no.: 1083444

Listed Building – Grade I
- Official name: Stables and Carriage House Approximately 20 Metres to South-East of Constable Burton Hall
- Designated: 16 December 1966
- Reference no.: 1366245

National Register of Historic Parks and Gardens
- Official name: Burton Constable
- Designated: 11 May 1984
- Reference no.: 1000921

Burton Constable Hall is a large Elizabethan country house in England, with 18th- and 19th-century interiors and a fine 18th-century cabinet of curiosities. The hall, a Grade I listed building, is set in a park designed by Capability Brown with an area of 300 acres (1.2 km^{2}). It is located 3 miles (5 km) south-east of the village of Skirlaugh in the East Riding of Yorkshire, approximately 9 miles (14 km) north-east of the city of Hull, and has been the home of the Constable family for over 400 years.

The hall and park are owned by the Burton Constable Foundation, a registered charity.

== History ==
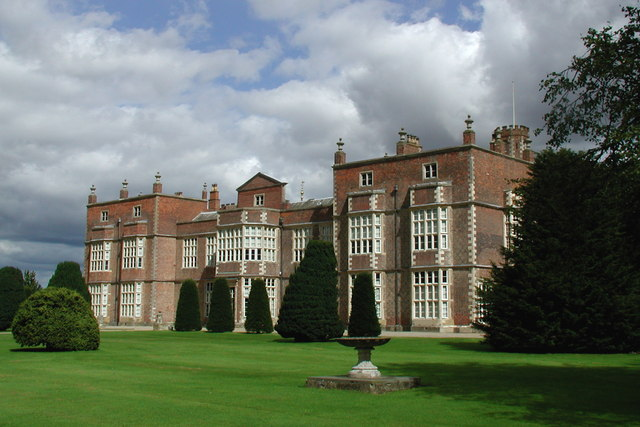
Burton Constable Hall garden front

Despite its apparent uniformity of style, Burton Constable has a long and complicated building history. The lower part of the north tower, built from limestone, is the oldest part of the house to survive and dates to the 12th century, when a medieval pele tower served to protect the village of Burton Constable from the time of the reign of King Stephen. In the late 15th century a new brick manor house was built at Burton Constable, eventually replacing Halsham as the family's principal seat. In the 1560s Sir John Constable embarked on the building of the Elizabethan prodigy house that stands today. This incorporated remains of the earlier manor house along with the addition of the new range containing a Great Hall, which rose the full height of the building and was top-lit by a lantern, along with a Parlour, Chambers and South Wing.

=== Museums ===
Although it is known that a museum existed in 1774, its location remains a mystery. It was referred to as the "White room adjoining Gallery" in the inventory of 1791, when it housed a number of framed drawings. The present-day Museum Rooms were, according to a plan of 1775, two bedrooms separated by a dressing room. By the 1850s an elaborate theatre had been created in this area, with the outer room serving as an auditorium and the inner room as a stage and fly tower. The Museum Rooms in their present form date from the 1970s, when William Constable's assorted collections of scientific material were recovered from attics where they had been stored since the early 19th century. The museum now displays part of the most substantial Cabinet of Curiosities to be found in any English country house. In 2003, the Burton Constable Foundation purchased an 18th-century telescope which had, before its sale around 1960, been for some two centuries a well-known feature of the house. It was originally acquired by William Constable, who purchased it from the famous York clockmaker Henry Hindley in 1760 for the sum of 100 guineas (£105). It is thought to be the world's first equatorially-mounted telescope.

== Architecture ==
The house is built of reddish-brown brick, with diapering in purple brick, stone dressings, and roofs of Welsh slate and lead. It has an approximately H-shaped plan, with ranges around a courtyard to the south. The main east range has three storeys and nine bays. The outer bays have full-height canted bay windows rising to form turrets, and the central bay projects under a pediment with a coat of arms. Flanking the outer bays are square embattled towers, the left with a taller octagonal stair turret, and both towers have projecting two-storey wings. In the centre is a doorway with paired Tuscan columns, a fanlight, a triglyph frieze and a dentilled cornice. Most of the windows are mullioned and transomed. The west front has two storeys and five bays, with a central three-storey bay, flanked by three-storey two-bay ranges. In the centre, steps lead up to double French doors with an architrave, a pulvinated frieze and a hood.

=== Remodelling of the house in the 1760s ===
By the 18th century, the Great Hall must have seemed old fashioned, and a surviving design of c. 1730 suggests that Cuthbert Constable intended to completely remodel the interior. However, it appears that remodelling was not undertaken until the 1760s when his son William Constable commissioned a number of architects for designs. These included John Carr, Timothy Lightoler and Capability Brown. The decorative plasterwork was executed by James Henderson of York. At this time, Constable also acquired the plaster figures of Demosthenes and Hercules with Cerberus, and plaster busts of the Roman emperor Marcus Aurelius Antoninus and the Greek poet Sappho, from the sculptor John Cheere. Above the fireplace is a carving of oak boughs and garlands of laurel leaves, crowned by the Garter Star, surrounding the armorial shield of the Constable family in scagliola by Domenico Bartoli.

The dining room was substantially remodelled by William Constable in the 1760s, who commissioned designs from Robert Adam, Thomas Atkinson, and Timothy Lightoler (who won the commission). The ceiling draws on contemporary interest in the excavations at Pompeii and Herculaneum, with plasterwork by Giuseppe Cortese. The overmantel plaque of Bacchus and Ariadne riding on a panther was modelled on famous antique cameos illustrated in Pierres Antiques Gravées, published 1724 by Philip, Baron von Stosch and Bernard Picart. This room was again redecorated in the 19th century.

=== Long gallery ===
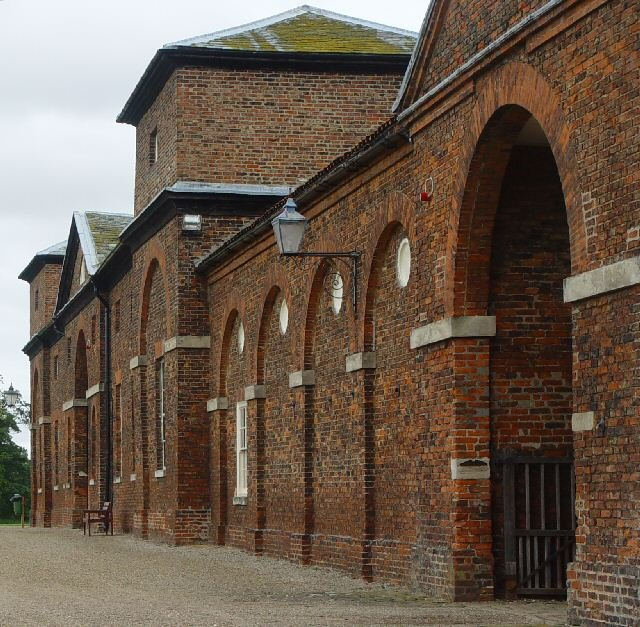
Stable block

The long gallery, along the west front of the upper floor, was completed by the end of the 16th century. When Dame Margaret Constable was given leave to 'walke at her pleasure' in 1610, the Long Gallery would have been sparsely furnished, and probably remained as such throughout the 17th century. However, its panelling dates from the late 17th century, as does the marble fireplace. Its elm and mahogany bookcases were installed in the 1740s by Cuthbert Constable, and the neo-Jacobean plasterwork on the ceiling and frieze dates from the 1830s. In 1833, the Clifford-Constable family began restoring the Long Gallery, including the acquisition of sphinx tables by Giuseppe Leonardi with tops of specimen marbles by Giacomo Raffaelli.

=== Chinese room ===
The Chinese Room was inspired by visits to Brighton Pavilion in the 1830s by Marianne, Lady Clifford-Constable and her sister Eliza. The woodworker Thomas Brooks carved the gilded dragons. Marianne designed the dragon chair, which was carved in 1841 by Thomas Wilkinson Wallis while still serving his apprenticeship with Thomas Ward of Hull.

== Grounds and park ==
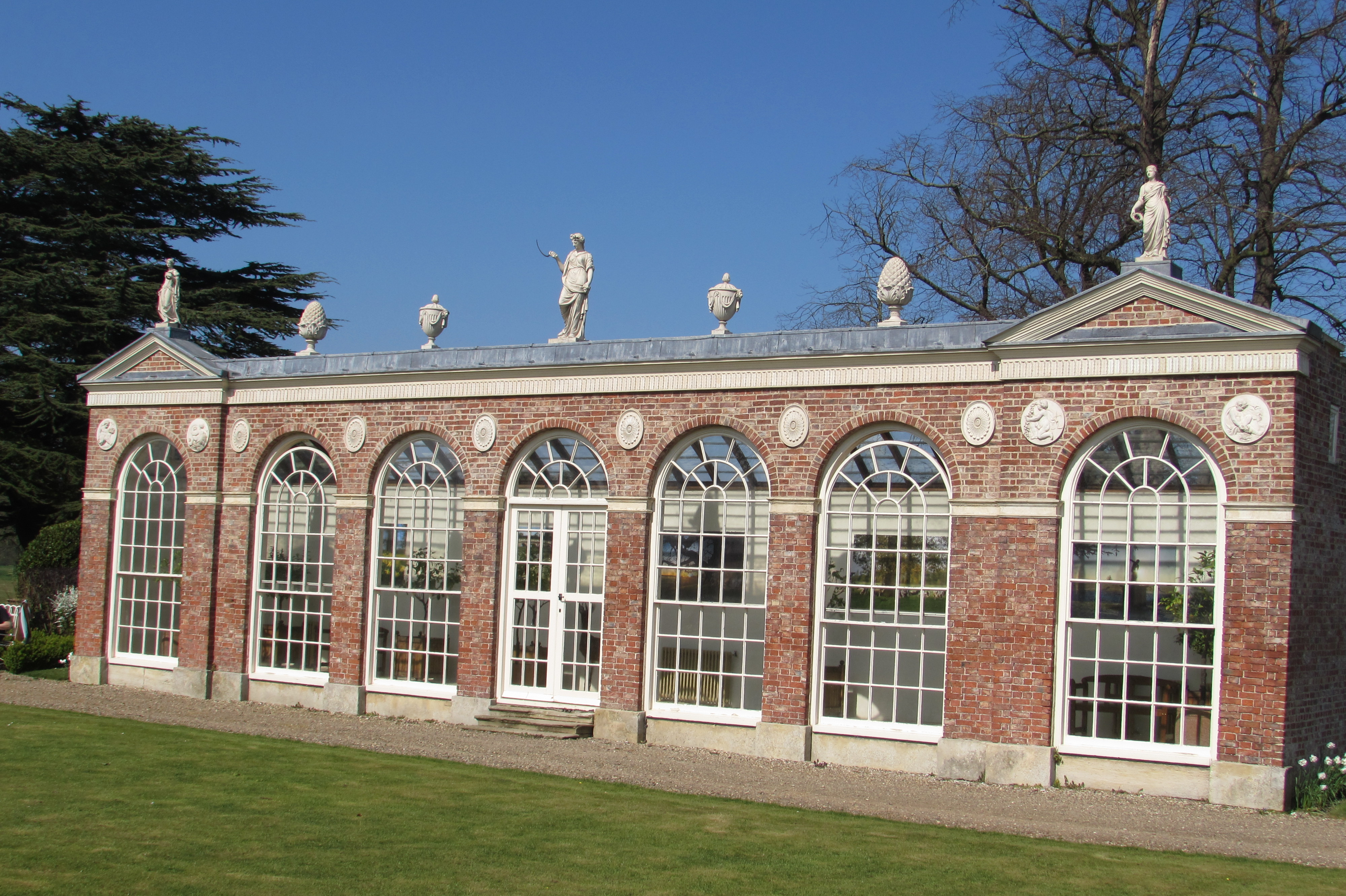
The Orangery, 1782

The medieval open field system was used before the deer park was created in 1517. William Senior's 1621 survey indicates that the park was then made up of a series of enclosures with the main entrance to the house from the east, approached by a walk or avenue. The ancient moat stretched around two sides of the hall. Some way to the west, there were three long, narrow fish ponds. In 1715, considerable work was undertaken for William, 4th Viscount Dunbar in levelling land for new gardens. It seems likely that a lawn was created at this time on the west front, and to the north a grove containing a geometrical arrangement of paths. In 1757, William Constable consulted Thomas Knowlton, head gardener of the Londesborough Estate which belonged to the Earl of Burlington. Knowlton proposed a menagerie, at the north end of the lakes that is now Grade II* listed and a stove garden set close to the house on the west front, which contained a greenhouse 203 feet (62 m) long.

Lancelot "Capability" Brown, who was responsible for landscaping between 1772 and 1782, joined the ponds to create the two lakes separated by a dam-cum-bridge, planting clumps of trees, installing sunk fences and the ha-ha. Burton Constable is one of Brown's best documented projects, as notes of his eight visits and the instructions he issued whilst touring the ongoing works were recorded and kept by the estate steward, John Raines. Known as "Hints from Mr. Brown" or "Mr Brown's Directions", the documents were digitised in 2016 as part of Burton Constable's contributions to the Capability Brown Festival, celebrating the tercentenary of his birth.

The Elizabethan stable block adjacent to the house was demolished to be replaced in 1768 by Lightoler's Palladian stables. The stables were designated in 1966 by English Heritage as a Grade I listed building. Closer to the house, a new Orangery was completed in 1782 to the designs of Thomas Atkinson with artificial stone ornament supplied by Eleanor Coade. This was designated in 1966 as Grade II*.

=== Menagerie ===
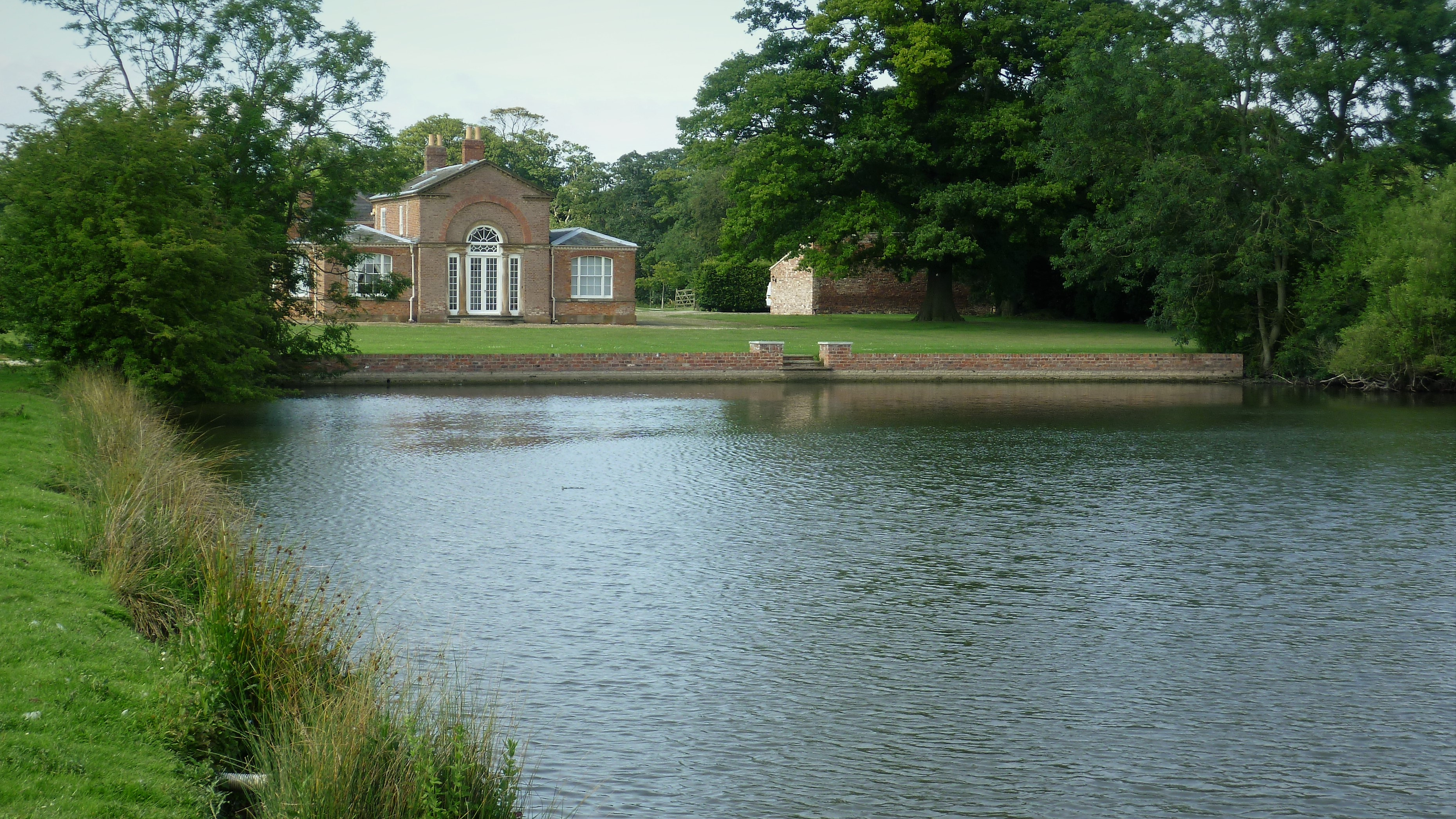
The Menagerie

The Menagerie, later converted for residential use, is in reddish-brown brick on a stone plinth, with dressings in red brick and stone, and a Welsh slate roof. It consists of a central two-storey bay flanked by single storey wings. In the centre is a recessed round-headed arch with moulded imposts containing a doorway in the form of a Venetian window, with Tuscan columns and pilasters. Above is an open pedimented gable with dentilled moulding continuing as an eaves cornice. The outer bays have a dentilled eaves band and roofs hipped at the front. On the left return is a semicircular bow window.

=== Stables and Carriage House ===
The stables and carriage house, later used for other purposes, are in reddish-brown brick on a plinth, with dressings in red brick and stone, and roof in Welsh slate and pantile. They are arranged around two inner courtyards, with a block at the rear. The main front has a two-storey six-bay range, flanked by three-storey single-bay towers. The middle three bays and the end bays project slightly, and all contain a round-arched recess with a stone impost band. In the centre is a doorway with a flat head, over which is a horse's head in stone, and it is flanked by round-arched recesses containing urns. The ground floor windows are sashes, and elsewhere there are casements. Above is a moulded cornice, and over the middle three bays is a pediment. The towers have pyramidal roofs.

=== Orangery ===
The orangery, designed by Thomas Atkinson, is in pinkish-red brick on a plinth, with stone dressings, a moulded impost band, and a glass roof. There is a single storey, seven bays, the outer bays projecting under pediments, and a rear outshut. The middle bay contains a round-headed doorway with a radial fanlight, and the other bays contain round-headed sash windows. The spandrels of the outer bays contain circular plaques with figures, and the others have paterae. At the top is a frieze decorated with palm fronds, a cornice, and a low parapet, on which are urns, pineapple finials and statues, in Coade stone.

=== Old Lodge ===
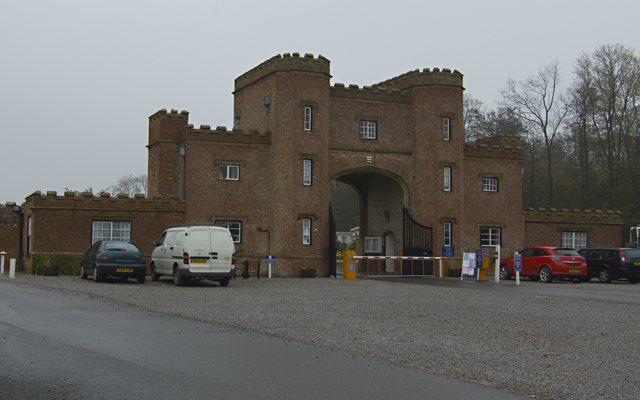
The Old Lodge

The lodge and gatehouse at the southern entrance to the grounds of the house were designed by James Wyatt, and the building was later extended. It is in pinkish-brown brick on a chamfered plinth, with stone dressings, chamfered cornices, embattled parapets, and roofs in lead and Welsh slate. There are seven bays. In the centre is a three-storey bay containing a Tudor arched carriage opening, above which is a shield, and a stone band, and a horizontally sliding sash window with a hood mould. This is flanked by three-storey, single-bay octagonal turrets, with narrow windows, outside which are single-bay two-storey wings. Beyond these are single-bay wings and curved walls ending in octagonal piers. The building was completed in 1786 and is grade II listed.

=== Bridge ===
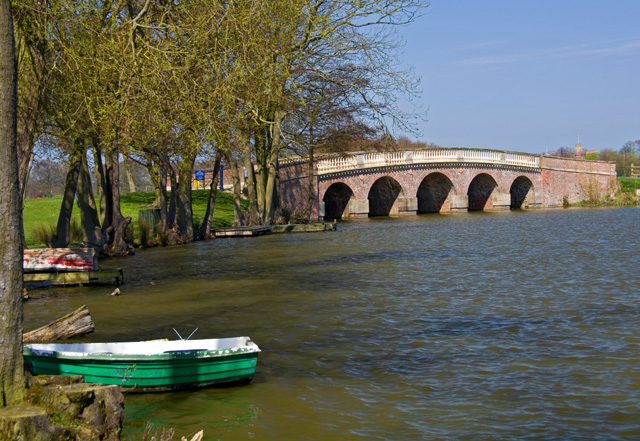
The lake and bridge

The grade II-listed bridge crossing the lake in the grounds to the southwest of the house was designed by Capability Brown and was completed around 1770. It is in pinkish-brown brick with stone dressings and a cast iron balustrade, the balusters with acanthus leaf vases. The bridge consists of five stepped round arches with gauged brick heads. It has a modillion cornice and moulded copings. The flanking brick walls have a stone band and a plain parapet, and they end in square piers.

=== Whale skeleton ===
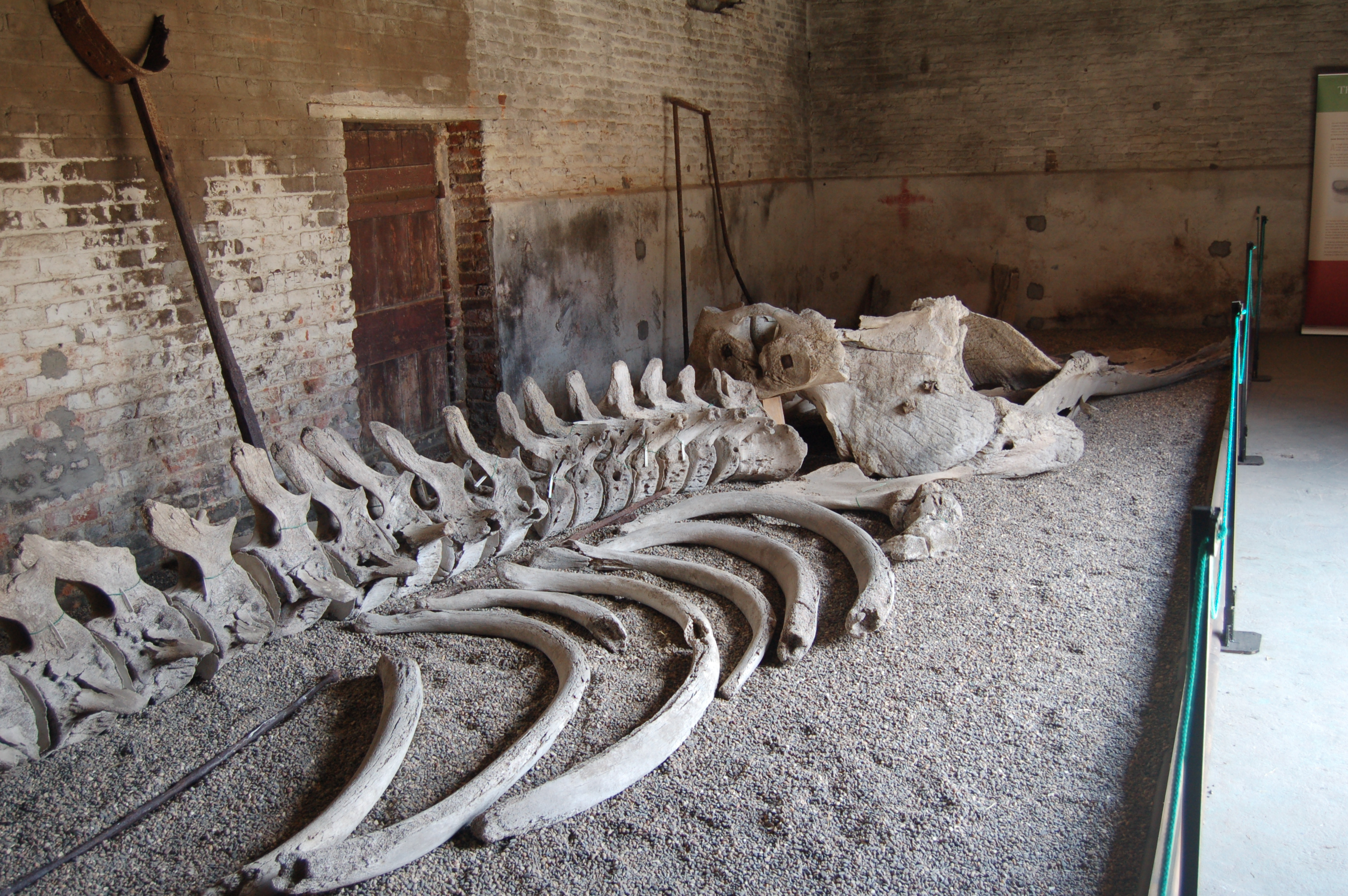
Sperm whale skeleton

An unusual feature in the park during the 19th century was the skeleton of a 59-foot-long (18 m) sperm whale erected on ironwork. The bull whale had been stranded in 1825 on the shore at nearby Tunstall and was carefully dissected and studied by James Alderson, a celebrated Hull surgeon. The whale skeleton was brought to Burton Constable, since as Lord Paramount of the Seigniory of Holderness, Sir Clifford was entitled to anything of interest that washed up on the foreshore. This famous whale also came to the attention of Herman Melville, who published his masterpiece Moby-Dick in 1851: "at a place in Yorkshire, England, Burton Constable by name, a certain Sir Clifford Constable has in his possession the skeleton of a Sperm Whale ... Sir Clifford's whale has been articulated throughout; so that like a great chest of drawers, you can open and shut him, in all his long cavities—spread out his ribs like a gigantic fan—and swing all day upon his lower jaw. Locks are to be put upon some of his trap doors and shutters; and a footman will show round future visitors with a bunch of keys at his side. Sir Clifford thinks of charging twopence for a peep at the whispering gallery in the spinal column; threepence to hear the echo in the hollow of his cerebellum; and sixpence for the unrivalled view from his forehead."

The whale skeleton can still be seen at Burton Constable Hall, in the Great Barn.

== See also ==
- Grade I listed buildings in the East Riding of Yorkshire
- Listed buildings in Burton Constable
