= West Newton, East Riding of Yorkshire =

Hamlet in the East Riding of Yorkshire, England

Coordinates: 53.822511°N 0.179653°W

West Newton
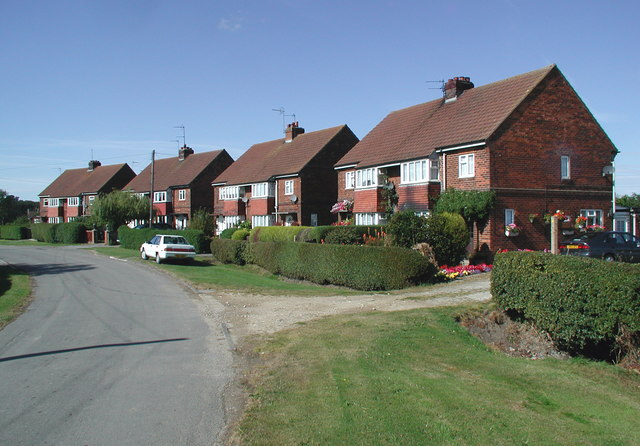
- Houses in West Newton

- Location within the East Riding of Yorkshire
- OS grid reference: TA199377
- Civil parish: Burton Constable
- Unitary authority: East Riding of Yorkshire
- Ceremonial county: East Riding of Yorkshire
- Region: Yorkshire and the Humber
- Country: England
- Sovereign state: United Kingdom
- Post town: HULL
- Postcode district: HU11
- Dialling code: 01964
- Police: Humberside
- Fire: Humberside
- Ambulance: Yorkshire
- UK Parliament: Beverley and Holderness

West Newton is a hamlet in the East Riding of Yorkshire, England. It is situated approximately 9 miles (14 km) north-east of Hull city centre and 6 miles (9.7 km) south of Hornsea. In 1935, both the townships of Marton and West Newton were merged into the civil parish of Burton Constable.

== History ==
In 1870–72, John Marius Wilson's Imperial Gazetteer of England and Wales described West Newton like this:

NEWTON (West), a township, with a village, in Aldbrough parish, E. R. Yorkshire; miles N E of Hull. Acres, 778. Real property, £3, 218. Pop., 220. Houses, 30. An hospital was founded here, prior to 1179, by William Earl of Albemarle.

== Natural resources ==
The area around West Newton has been the site of test drilling for gas and oil. In 2014, people complained that noxious fumes were being emitted from a site near to the village and the smell was making them sick. In June 2019, the company testing for gas announced that preliminary data from the borehole suggested that there was an accessible resource of 189,000,000,000 cubic metres (6.7×10^{12} cu ft) of gas, or 31 million barrels of oil from a borehole that extended over 6,562 feet (2,000 m).

If the assessment is correct, it would be the biggest onshore gas and oilfield in the United Kingdom. Previously this was the Saltfleetby field in Lincolnshire discovered in 1973 with a capacity of 73,000,000,000 cubic metres (2.6×10^{12} cu ft) of gas.

== See also ==
- Listed buildings in Burton Constable
