= Burton Constable =

Civil parish in the East Riding of Yorkshire, England

Coordinates: 53.814°N 0.206°W

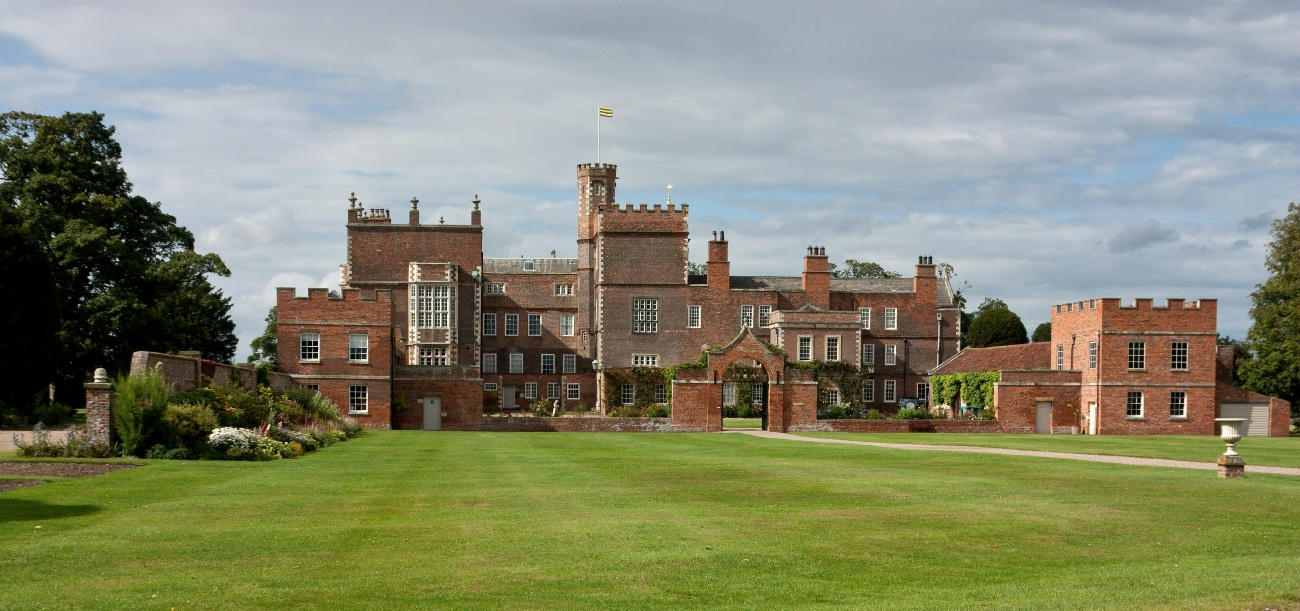
- Burton Constable Hall

- Location within the East Riding of Yorkshire
- Population: 115 (in 2021)
- OS grid reference: TA182368
  - London: 160 mi (260 km) S
- Civil parish: Burton Constable
- Unitary authority: East Riding of Yorkshire
- Ceremonial county: East Riding of Yorkshire
- Region: Yorkshire and the Humber
- Country: England
- Sovereign state: United Kingdom
- Post town: HULL
- Postcode district: HU11
- Dialling code: 01964
- Police: Humberside
- Fire: Humberside
- Ambulance: Yorkshire
- UK Parliament: Beverley and Holderness

Burton Constable is a civil parish in the East Riding of Yorkshire, England. It lies approximately 9 miles (14 km) north-east of Hull city centre and 3 miles (5 km) south-east of the village of Skirlaugh. The civil parish is formed by the hamlets of Marton and West Newton, and traces of the deserted medieval village of Burton Constable. At the 2021 census, the population of the parish was 115.

The name Burton derives from the Old English burhtūn meaning 'settlement at the fort'. The place was recorded as Santri Burtone in the Domesday Book of 1086, when the Archbishop of York held 5 carucates of land there. The origin of the prefix santri is unknown. In the early 12th century land in the manor was occupied by Erneburga, who married Ulbert, the constable of the Count of Aumale. Their son was Robert Constable, and the manor was subsequently known as Burton Constable.

It is the site of Burton Constable Hall, a Grade I listed Elizabethan country house.

Burton Constable was served from 1864 to 1964 by Burton Constable railway station on the Hull and Hornsea Railway.

Marmaduke Tunstall, the 18th-century ornithologist, was born in the village.

== See also ==
- Listed buildings in Burton Constable
