= Listed buildings in Burton Constable =

Burton Constable is a civil parish in the county of the East Riding of Yorkshire, England. It contains 16 listed buildings that are recorded in the National Heritage List for England. Of these, two are listed at Grade I, the highest of the three grades, two are at Grade II*, the middle grade, and the others are at Grade II, the lowest grade. The parish contains the deserted medieval village of Burton Constable, the hamlets of Marton and West Newton, and the surrounding countryside. The most important building in the parish is the country house Burton Constable Hall, which is listed, and most of the other listed buildings are associated with it. The rest include a church, farmhouses and a former school.

== Key ==
Grade	Criteria
I	Buildings of exceptional interest, sometimes considered to be internationally important
II*	Particularly important buildings of more than special interest
II	Buildings of national importance and special interest

== Buildings ==
Name and location	Photograph	Date	Notes	Grade
Burton Constable Hall; 53.81384°N 0.19628°W		Late 16th century	A country house in reddish-brown brick, with diapering in purple brick, stone dressings, and roofs of Welsh slate and lead. It has an approximately H-shaped plan, with ranges around a courtyard to the south. The main east range has three storeys and nine bays. The outer bays have full-height canted bay windows rising to form turrets, and the central bay projects under a pediment with a coat of arms. Flanking the outer bays are square embattled towers, the left with a taller octagonal stair turret, and both towers have projecting two-storey wings. In the centre is a doorway with paired Tuscan columns, a fanlight, a triglyph frieze and a dentilled cornice. Most of the windows are mullioned and transomed. The west front has two storeys and five bays, with a central three-storey bay, flanked by three-storey two-bay ranges. In the centre, steps lead up to double French doors with an architrave, a pulvinated frieze and a hood.	I
Farmhouse north of the entrance to Pipers Lane; 53.83555°N 0.20136°W		Mid-18th century	The farmhouse is in red brick, with a pantile roof and tumbled brick to the raised gables. There is one storey and attics, three bays, and a rear outshut. The doorway has a plain fanlight, the windows are sashes, and above are three gabled roof dormers.	II
Wood House; 53.82354°N 0.19233°W		Mid-18th century	The farmhouse is in reddish-pink brick, colourwashed on the front, and has a pantile roof with brick copings, and tumbled-in brickwork on the gable ends. There are two storeys and two bays, and a recessed single-storey wing on the left. The doorway is in the wing, and the windows are sashes.	II
The Menagerie, Burton Constable Hall; 53.81298°N 0.20404°W		c. 1762	The building, later converted for residential use, is in reddish-brown brick on a stone plinth, with dressings in red brick and stone, and a Welsh slate roof. It consists of a central two-storey bay flanked by single storey wings. In the centre is a recessed round-headed arch with moulded imposts containing a doorway in the form of a Venetian window, with Tuscan columns and pilasters. Above is an open pedimented gable with dentilled moulding continuing as an eaves cornice. The outer bays have a dentilled eaves band and roofs hipped at the front. On the left return is a semicircular bow window.	II*
The Old School House; 53.83004°N 0.19431°W	—	Mid to late 18th century	A school, later a private house, it is in pinkish-red brick with a dentilled eaves band, and a pantile roof with brick copings, and tumbled-in brickwork on the gable ends. There are two storeys, an L-shaped plan with later infill, and a front of three bays. The doorway is in the centre, the windows on the front are sashes, and on the right return is a horizontally sliding sash window.	II
Stables and Carriage House, Burton Constable Hall; 53.81260°N 0.19446°W		c. 1768	The stables and carriage house, later used for other purposes, are in reddish-brown brick on a plinth, with dressings in red brick and stone, and roof in Welsh slate and pantile. They are arranged around two inner courtyards, with a block at the rear. The main front has a two-storey six-bay range, flanked by three-storey single-bay towers. The middle three bays and the end bays project slightly, and all contain a round-arched recess with a stone impost band. In the centre is a doorway with a flat head, over which is a horse's head in stone, and it is flanked by round-arched recesses containing urns. The ground floor windows are sashes, and elsewhere there are casements. Above is a moulded cornice, and over the middle three bays is a pediment. The towers have pyramidal roofs.	I
Bridge over the Lake, Burton Constable Hall; 53.80732°N 0.20155°W		c. 1770 (probable)	The bridge crossing the lake in the grounds to the southwest of the house was designed by Capability Brown. It is in pinkish-brown brick with stone dressings and a cast iron balustrade, the balusters with acanthus leaf vases. The bridge consists of five stepped round arches with gauged brick heads. It has a modillion cornice and moulded copings. The flanking brick walls have a stone band and a plain parapet, and they end in square piers.	II
Garden cottage west of Burton Constable Hall; 53.81434°N 0.20627°W		c. 1770	The cottage is in reddish-brown brick on a stone plinth, with dressings in red brick and stone, and a Welsh slate roof with stone copings, and a pedimented gable with a dentilled cornice, containing a semicircular window. On the front is an arcade of three recessed round arches with stone imposts. The central arch contains a doorway, above is a sash window, and the outer arches contain casement windows.	II
Gardener's Cottage southeast of Burton Constable Hall; 53.81204°N 0.19335°W		c. 1770	The cottage is in pinkish-brown brick, with a floor band and a pantile roof. It has a two-bay centre with an eaves band and a coped gable, flanked by single-storey wings with sloping roofs. In the centre is a round-arched recess containing a doorway flanked by sash windows. Above the arch and on the wings are sash windows with segmental arches.	II
Ha-ha, Burton Constable Hall; 53.81343°N 0.19782°W	—	c. 1770	The ha-ha to the wwest of the house is in reddish-pink brick with brick coping. It has a semicircular plan, and is about 1 metre (3 ft 3 in) in height.	II
Head gardener's cottage west of Burton Constable Hall; 53.81421°N 0.20686°W		c. 1770	The cottage is in reddish-brown brick on a stone plinth, with dressings in red brick and stone, and a Welsh slate roof with stone copings, and a pedimented gable with a dentilled cornice, containing a semicircular recess. On the front is an arcade of three recessed round arches with stone imposts. The outer arches contain casement windows, and the entrance is on the side.	II
Mount Pleasant Farmhouse; 53.82266°N 0.17542°W	—	Late 18th century	The farmhouse is in pinkish-brown brick, and has a Welsh slate roof with brick copings. It has a main block with two storeys and three bays, a lower two-storey two-bay wing on the left, and a single-storey wing on the right. The central doorway has pilasters, a frieze and a hood, and the windows are sashes with channelled wedge lintels.	II
Old Lodge, Burton Constable Hall; 53.80239°N 0.19939°W		1786	The lodge and gatehouse at the southern entrance to the grounds of the house were designed by James Wyatt, and the building was later extended. It is in pinkish-brown brick on a chamfered plinth, with stone dressings, chamfered cornices, embattled parapets, and roofs in lead and Welsh slate. There are seven bays. In the centre is a three-storey bay containing a Tudor arched carriage opening, above which is a shield, and a stone band, and a horizontally sliding sash window with a hood mould. This is flanked by three-storey, single-bay octagonal turrets, with narrow windows, outside which are single-bay two-storey wings. Beyond these are single-bay wings and curved walls ending in octagonal piers.	II
The Orangery, Burton Constable Hall; 53.81296°N 0.19658°W		1788	The orangery, designed by Thomas Atkinson, is in pinkish-red brick on a plinth, with stone dressings, a moulded impost band, and a glass roof. There is a single storey, seven bays, the outer bays projecting under pediments, and a rear outshut. The middle bay contains a round-headed doorway with a radial fanlight, and the other bays contain round-headed sash windows. The spandrels of the outer bays contain circular plaques with figures, and the others have paterae. At the top is a frieze decorated with palm fronds, a cornice, and a low parapet, on which are urns, pineapple finials and statues, in Coade stone.	II*
Church of the Most Holy Sacrament; 53.83058°N 0.19471°W		1789	The church, designed by Thomas Atkinson, is in pinkish-brown brick with a Welsh slate roof. There is a single tall storey and three bays, a single-bay extension to east and a porch to west. On the south side are three round-arched windows, and on the north side is the presbytery. The church stands on a moated site.	II
Tower House; 53.80845°N 0.1875171°W		Early to mid-19th century	Originally the engine house and water tower of Burton Constable Hall, later converted for residential use. It is in reddish-brown brick with dressings in yellow brick and stone, with a yellow brick eaves course and embattled parapets. The main block has three bays, the middle bay projecting with three storeys, and the outer bays with two storeys. The middle bay has a basket-arched entrance above which is a heraldic shield, and most of the windows are mullioned and transomed with casements and hood moulds. At the rear is an older octagonal water tower with an embattled parapet.	II
