= Most Holy Sacrament Church, Marton =

Church in the East Riding of Yorkshire, England

Coordinates: 53°49′50″N 0°11′41″W

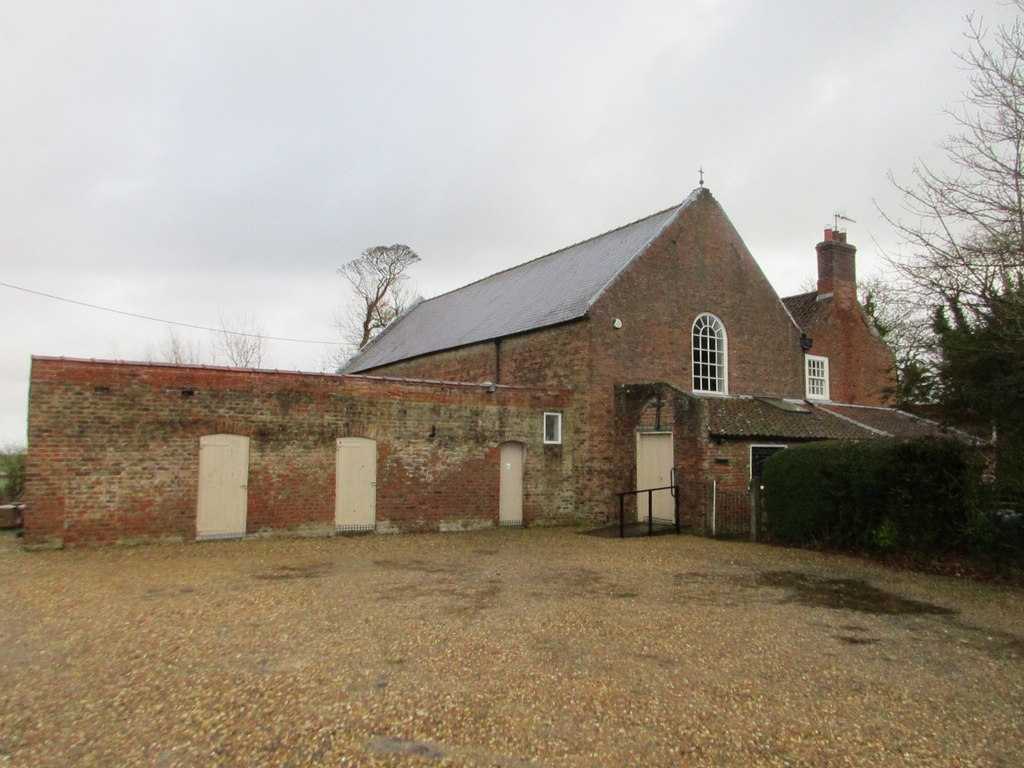
The church, in 2018

The Most Holy Sacrament Church is a Catholic church in Marton, East Riding of Yorkshire, in England.

The church was built between 1788 and 1789, with funding from William Constable. It was designed by Thomas Atkinson in a simple, domestic, style, and stands on a moated site. It was extended to the east in the 19th century, and a porch was added to the west in the 20th century. The building was grade II listed in 1987.

The church is built of pinkish-brown brick with a Welsh slate roof. It has a single tall storey and three bays, a single-bay extension to east and a porch to west. On the south side are three round-arched windows, and on the north side is the presbytery. Inside, there is a gallery at the west end, supported by Doric colyumns, wall paintings in the shallow chancel. There is a marble wall monument sculpted by Thomas Tyley, some remnants of box pews, and one stained glass window, installed in 1946.

== See also ==
- Listed buildings in Burton Constable
