= Marton, East Riding of Yorkshire =

Hamlet in the East Riding of Yorkshire, England

Coordinates: 53°50′10″N 0°12′34″W

Marton
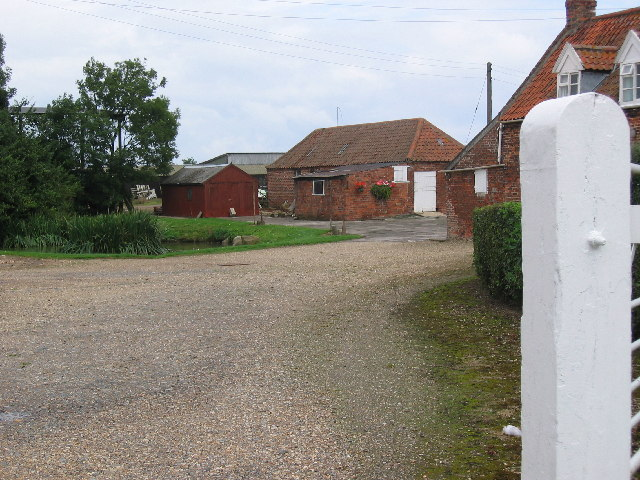
- Hill Farm, Marton

- Location within the East Riding of Yorkshire
- OS grid reference: TA179392
  - London: 160 mi (260 km) S
- Civil parish: Burton Constable
- Unitary authority: East Riding of Yorkshire
- Ceremonial county: East Riding of Yorkshire
- Region: Yorkshire and the Humber
- Country: England
- Sovereign state: United Kingdom
- Post town: HULL
- Postcode district: HU11
- Dialling code: 01964
- Police: Humberside
- Fire: Humberside
- Ambulance: Yorkshire
- UK Parliament: Beverley and Holderness

Marton is a hamlet in the civil parish of Burton Constable, in the East Riding of Yorkshire, England, and in an area known as Holderness. It is situated approximately 8 miles (13 km) north-east of Kingston upon Hull city centre and 2 miles (3.2 km) east of the village of Skirlaugh and the A165 road.

Marton was formerly a township in the parish of Swine, in 1866 Marton became a separate civil parish, on 1 April 1935 the parish was abolished and merged with Burton Constable. In 1931 the parish had a population of 73.

In 1823 Marton was in the Wapentake and Liberty of Holderness. A Catholic chapel was the only place of worship. Population at the time was 129, with occupations including nine farmers and a shoemaker. A carrier, who was also a Licensed victualler, operated between the village and Hull twice weekly.

Marton was served from 1864 to 1964 by Burton Constable railway station on the Hull and Hornsea Railway.

To the south-east of the settlement is the Roman Catholic Most Holy Sacrament Church which is a Grade II listed building.

The name Marton derives from the Old English meretūn meaning 'mere settlement'.

== See also ==
- Listed buildings in Burton Constable
