= Abraham Woodhead =

English writer

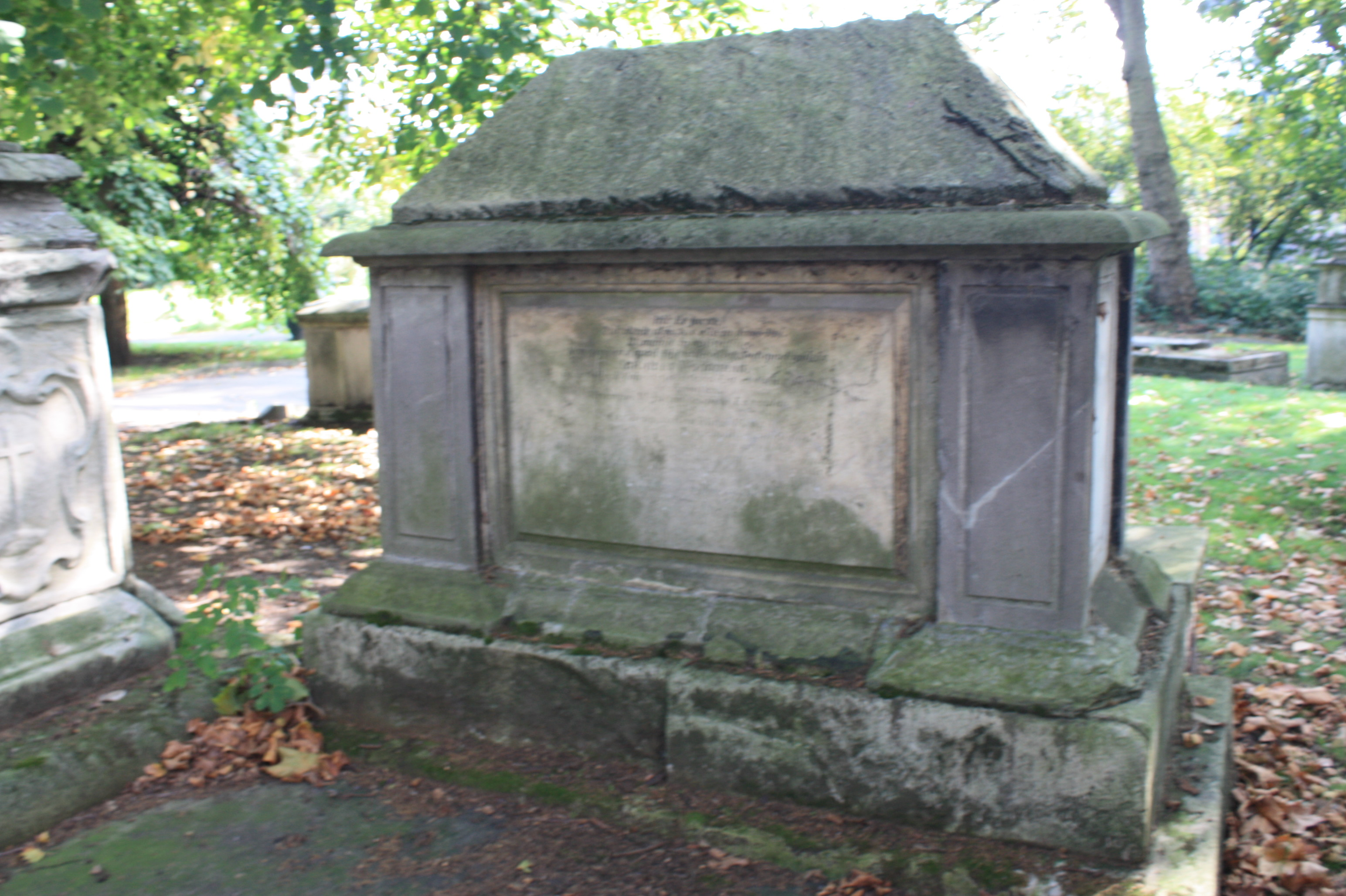
The grave of Abraham Woodhead, Old St Pancras Churchyard, London

Abraham Woodhead (c. March 1609 – 4 May 1678) was an English writer on Catholicism.

== Life ==
Born at Meltham in the parish of Almondbury, West Yorkshire, he died at Hoxton in Middlesex. He was educated at University College, Oxford, entering in 1624, becoming fellow in 1633, and proctor in 1641. While travelling abroad in 1645, he began to think of joining the Catholic Church, but the exact date of his conversion is not known.

Ejected from his fellowship in 1648, he became tutor to the young Duke of Buckingham, and then lived with the Earl of Essex and other friends till 1654, when he and some other Catholics purchased a house at Hoxton, where they lived a community life, occupying themselves with devotion and study. In 1660, his fellowship was restored, but after a brief residence in Oxford he returned to the more congenial surroundings at Hoxton, where, assured of the income of his fellowship, he lived till his death occupied in literary labours. Thomas Hearne, the antiquarian, declared him to be "one of the greatest men that ever this nation produced".

He is buried in Old St Pancras Churchyard in a large marble sarcophagus, typical of the churchyard, just south of the church itself.

== Works ==
Among his numerous books the chief original works were:

- "Ancient Church Government", 5 parts (1662–85);
- "Guide in Controversies" (1667), and a long appendix thereto (1675);
- four theological works against Edward Stillingfleet;
- "Life of Christ" (1685);
- "Motives to Holy Living" (1688);
- "Discourse on the Eucharist" (1688);
- "On Images and Idolatry" (1689);
- an incomplete treatise on Antichrist (1689).

He also translated the "Life of St. Teresa" and Augustine's "Confessions", and paraphrased the Epistles of St. Paul (with Walker and Allestree) and the Apocalypse. A large collection of his unpublished manuscripts, with autograph letters and writings relating to him, which was formed in the eighteenth century by Cuthbert Constable, came into the possession of Sir Thomas Brooke, F.S.A., of Armitage Bridge, Huddersfield.
