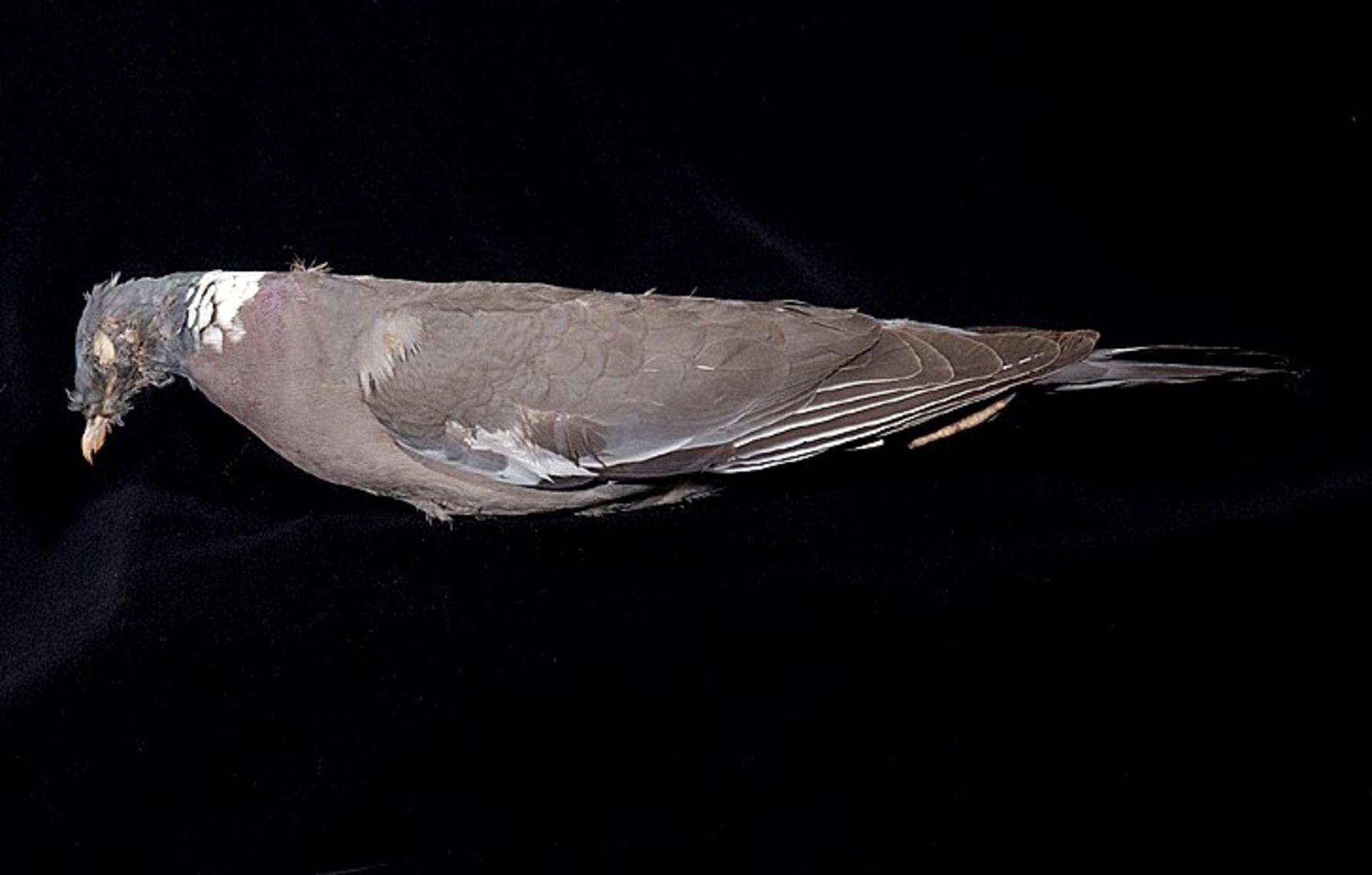

Conservation status
- Extinct (1924)

Scientific classification
- Domain: Eukaryota
- Kingdom: Animalia
- Phylum: Chordata
- Class: Aves
- Order: Columbiformes
- Family: Columbidae
- Genus: Columba
- Species: C. palumbus
- Subspecies: †C. p. maderensis

Trinomial name
- †Columba palumbus maderensis (Tschusi, 1904)

= Madeiran wood pigeon =

Extinct subspecies of bird

The Madeiran wood pigeon (Columba palumbus maderensis) is an extinct subspecies of the common wood pigeon endemic to Madeira (Portugal), and found in the island's laurel forest habitat.

The Madeiran wood pigeon closely resembled the wood pigeon of mainland Europe, but the plumage was somewhat darker, especially on the upperparts and under wing-coverts. The vinous-pink of the breast was more extensive.

The German ornithologist Ernst Schmitz lived on the island of Madeira by 1896–1906, a time when the Madeiran wood pigeon was already rare. Despite great efforts, Schmitz managed to collect only a few specimens and eggs. In May 1924, no Madeiran wood pigeon was found, nor was any seen in later years, not even by local pigeon hunters. This subspecies is most likely extinct.

== See also ==
- List of extinct birds
- List of extinct animals
- List of extinct animals of Europe
