= Wycliffe, County Durham =

Village in County Durham, England

Coordinates: 54.52471°N 1.82254°W

Wycliffe
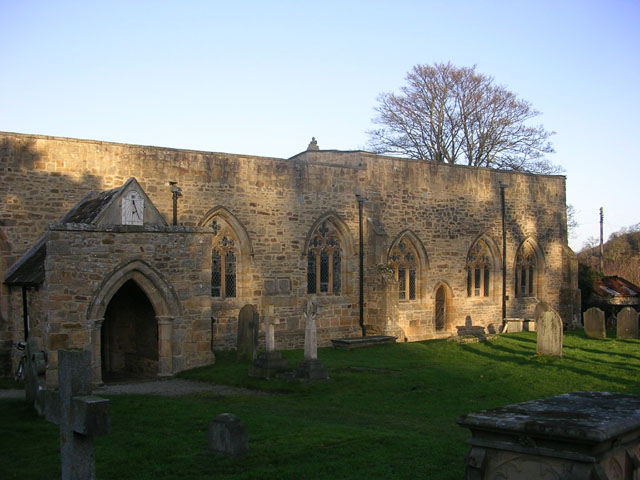
- St Mary's Church at Wycliffe

- Location within County Durham
- OS grid reference: NZ115143
- Unitary authority: County Durham
- Ceremonial county: County Durham
- Region: North East
- Country: England
- Sovereign state: United Kingdom
- Police: Durham
- Fire: County Durham and Darlington
- Ambulance: North East
- UK Parliament: Bishop Auckland

Wycliffe is a village on the south bank of the River Tees in the North East of England, situated a short distance to the east of Barnard Castle. Wycliffe is in the civil parish of Wycliffe with Thorpe.

It is located within the historic boundaries of the North Riding of Yorkshire, but along with the rest of the former Startforth Rural District it was transferred to County Durham for administrative and ceremonial purposes on 1 April 1974, under the provisions of the Local Government Act 1972.

A major monument of the Settlement is the medieval church of St Mary Whycliffe-with-Thorpe on a low-lying riverside site beside an ancient fording place in the River Tees.

== Notable people ==
- Marmaduke Tunstall (1743–1790), ornithologist
