= Marmaduke Tunstall =

English ornithologist and collector (1743–1790)

Marmaduke Tunstall FRS
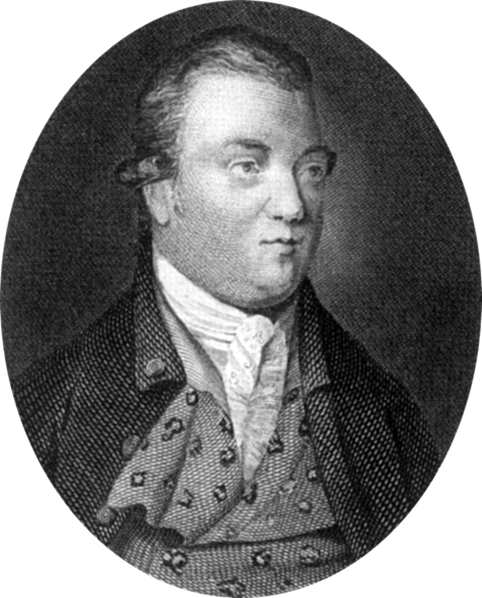
- Born: 1743; Burton Constable, Yorkshire
- Died: 11 October 1790 (aged 46–47); Wycliffe, County Durham
- Education: Douai, Nord, France
- Known for: Ornithologia Britannica (1771)
- Scientific career
- Fields: Ornithology
- Author abbrev. (zoology): Tunstall

Marmaduke Tunstall (1743 – 11 October 1790) was an English ornithologist and collector. He was the author of Ornithologia Britannica (1771), probably the first British work to use binomial nomenclature.

Tunstall was born at Burton Constable in Yorkshire. In 1760, he succeeded to the family estates of Scargill, Hutton, Long Villers and Wycliffe. Being a Catholic, he was educated at Douai in France. On completing his studies, he took up residence in Welbeck Street, London, where he formed an extensive museum, as well as a large collection of living birds and animals. He is known for formally describing the Peregrine falcon. After his marriage in 1776, the museum was moved to Wycliffe, and at the time, was one of the finest in England.

Tunstall became a fellow of the Society of Antiquaries of London at the age of twenty-one, and in 1771, was elected a fellow of the Royal Society.

Tunstall died at Wycliffe, and his estates passed to his half-brother, William Constable. Constable invited Thomas Bewick, whom Marmaduke had commissioned to engrave 'The Wild Bull of the Ancient Caledonian Breed, now in the park at Chilingham-Castle, Northumberland', to Wycliffe where he spent two months making drawings from the bird specimens. The museum, known as the Wycliffe Museum, was sold to George Allan of Blackwell Grange, Darlington who set up the contents in his home. The museum remained even after his death in 1800 at the Grange until 1822 when it was purchased by the Newcastle Literary and Philosophical Society, and becoming the "Newcastle Museum."

== See also ==
- Category:Taxa named by Marmaduke Tunstall
