= Viktor von Tschusi zu Schmidhoffen =

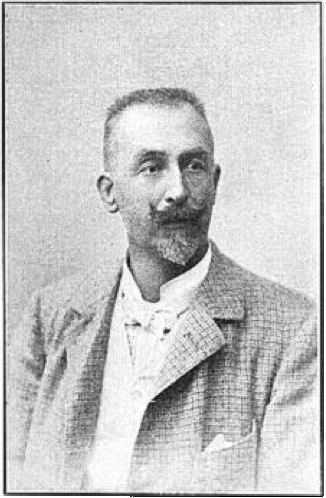
- A photograph of Tschusi from a 1905 issue of The Condor
- Born: 28 December 1847; Smíchov, Bohemia, Austrian Empire
- Died: 5 March 1924 (aged 76); Hallein, Austria
- Scientific career
- Fields: Ornithology
- Author abbrev. (zoology): Tschusi

Viktor von Tschusi zu Schmidhoffen (28 December 1847 – 5 March 1924) was an Austrian ornithologist.

== Biography ==
Tschusi was born on 28 December 1847 in Smíchov, Bohemia, Austrian Empire (now a district of Prague, Czech Republic). His father was a former officer in the Austro-Hungarian Army from a noble family of Tyrol, and Tschusi held the title of Reichsritter. Tschusi's father, and his mother Josephine, inspired an early interest in natural history. Tschusi attended gymnasium school at a Jesuit college at Kalksburg, near Vienna. He began his scientific studies under a private tutor when his family moved to Krems an der Donau, and to Schloss Arntsdorf after his father's death when he was 17. Tschusi learned to prepare bird specimens from a preparator at the Imperial Natural History Museum, and became skilled at collecting and preparing bird specimens. From 1868 to 1870, he travelled extensively in Austria, Bohemia, northern Italy, northern Germany, and Heligoland, meeting other ornithologists and visiting important bird collections.

Tschusi collected about 10,000 specimens over his life, which are now in the Imperial Natural History Museum, the Zoologische Staatssammlung München, and the Salzburg Ornithological Institute. He was a prolific writer, the author of over 700 publications. Tschusi specialized in the avifauna of the Palaearctic, becoming a noted expert on the subject, and exerted a great influence on the development of ornithology in Austria-Hungary. Among his works are the Ornithologisches Jahrbuch, published annually from 1890 until World War I, and bibliographies of Austria-Hungary's birds. Tschusi described a number of bird taxa, including the Madeiran wood pigeon. The European goldfinch subspecies Carduelis carduelis tschusii was named after him.

Tschusi participated in the First International Congress of Ornithologists, held in April 1884 in Vienna by Rudolf, Crown Prince of Austria, and was among the first members of the International Ornithological Committee. At the request of Prince Rudolf, Tschusi directed the ornithological observation stations in Austria-Hungary for eight years, editing the results of the work, and publishing them in the journal of the International Ornithological Committee, Ornis, and in six separate yearbooks. The studies undertaken at the ornithological observation stations, first proposed by R. Blasius and G. von Hayek, had led to the First International Congress of Ornithologists, and greatly influenced the progress of ornithology throughout the world.

Tschusi became a member of the Zoologisch-Botanische Gesellschaft of Vienna in 1865, and a member of the Deutsche Ornithologen-Gesellschaft in 1867. He was additionally a Corresponding Fellow of the American Ornithologists' Union from 1884.

Tschusi married Natalie Kuhn von Kuhnenfeld in April 1871. After his marriage he purchased Villa Tannenhof near Hallein, where was to live for the rest of his life. At Villa Tannenhof he hosted many of the noted ornithologists of his time. Tschusi's son Rudolf von Thanner was also an ornithologist, and became an expert on the birds of the Canary Islands and the other parts of Macaronesia. Von Thanner lived in Tenerife from 1902 to 1922, and his relatives were still living in the Canaries in 1997.

During World War I and the years following it, Tschusi and his wife were reduced to poverty and suffered greatly. His fortunes changed around his golden wedding anniversary in 1921, when he was granted a pension by the Austrian government and received an honorary doctorate from the University of Innsbruck. Tschusi died on 5 March 1924, at Tannenhof, where he had lived for 53 years.
