= Canary Islands dry woodlands and forests =

Ecoregion in the Canary Islands

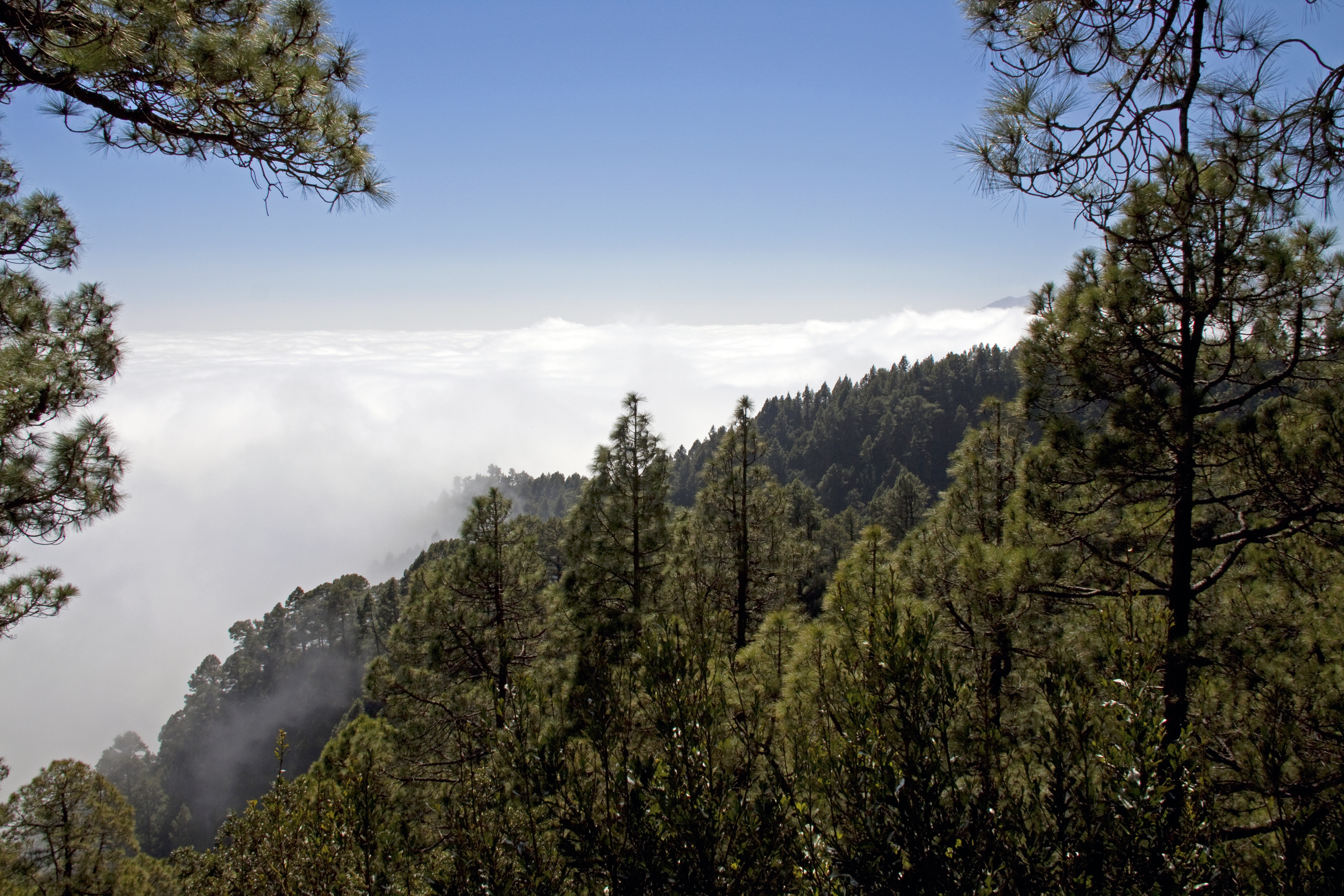
- Pines on La Palma

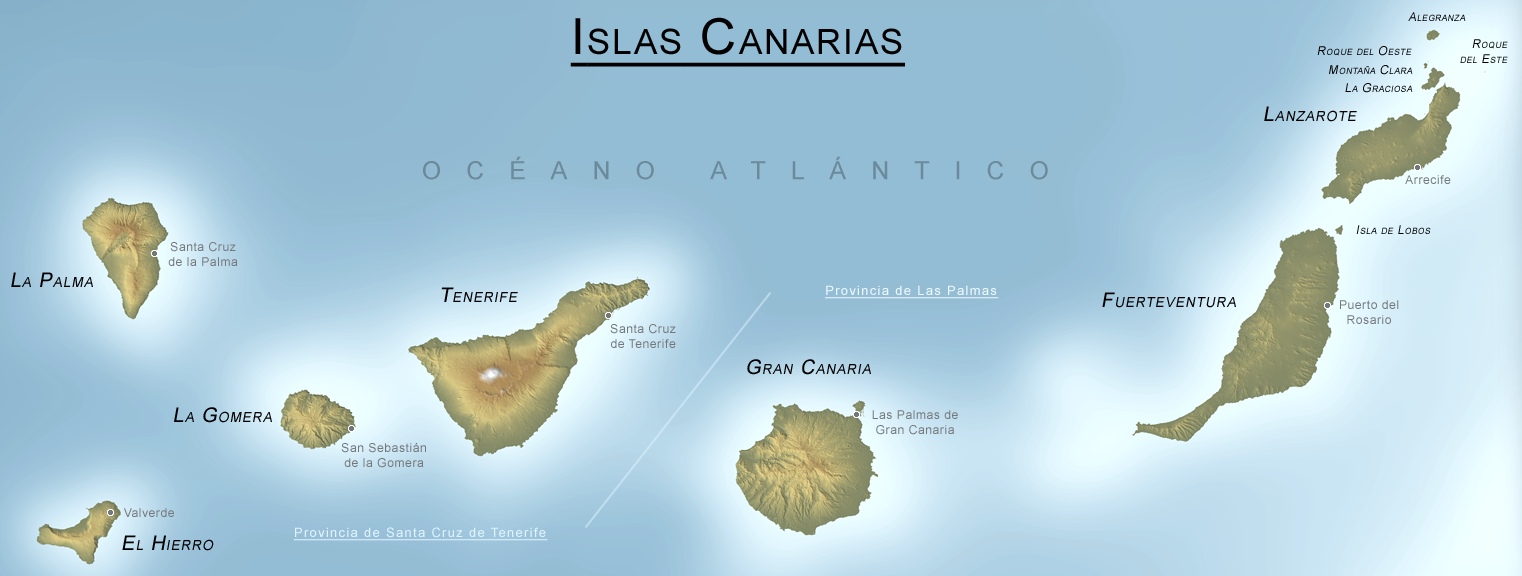
- Map of the Canary Islands. The ecoregion covers the five western islands – La Palma, El Hierro, La Gomera, Tenerife, and Gran Canaria.

Ecology
- Realm: Palearctic
- Biome: Mediterranean forests, woodlands, and scrub

Geography
- Area: 4,693 km^{2} (1,812 mi^{2})
- Country: Spain
- Autonomous community of Spain: Canary Islands

Conservation
- Conservation status: critical/endangered
- Protected: 2,417 km^{2} (52%)

The Canary Islands dry woodlands and forests is a Mediterranean forests, woodlands, and scrub ecoregion in the Canary Islands. It encompasses the western group of the Canary Islands – La Palma, El Hierro, La Gomera, Tenerife, and Gran Canaria – in the Atlantic Ocean. These volcanic islands are an autonomous community of Spain, and lie southwest of the Spanish mainland and west of the North African coast.

== Geography ==
The ecoregion covers an area of 4,693 km^{2}. The islands are mountainous and volcanic in origin. Teide on Tenerife reaches 3,718 m, Roque de los Muchachos on La Palma 2,426 m, Morro de la Agujereada on Gran Canaria 1,956 m, Pico de Malpaso on El Hierro 1,501 m, and Garajonay on La Gomera 1,487 m.

The eastern group of the Canary Islands, Fuerteventura, Lanzarote, and the nearby islets of the Chinijo Archipelago, are lower, drier, and closer to the African coast. These eastern group islands are part of the Mediterranean Acacia-Argania dry woodlands and succulent thickets ecoregion.

The Canary islands are part of Macaronesia, a group of archipelagoes in the Atlantic Ocean which share similar climate and ecology.

== Climate ==
The islands have an air hot desert climate (BWh) according to Köppen classification. Rain falls mostly in the winter months, and is highest in November and December. Climate varies with elevation and exposure. The mountains intercept moisture-laden winds and create orographic precipitation. Rainfall is higher on the windward northeastern sides of the islands, and lower on the southwestern rain shadow. The highest elevations experience seasonal frosts and snows.

== Flora ==
The islands' variations in elevation and rainfall support diverse plant communities.

Lowlands are principally scrub and open woodland, which extend from sea level to 600–1000 meters elevation. The Canary Island date palm (Phoenix canariensis) is prominent.

Laurel forests, or laurisilva, are found at middle elevations, from 500 and 1400 meters elevation. These forests are characterized by evergreen broadleaf trees, including many in the laurel family (Lauraceae) – Ocotea foetens, Persea barbujana, Laurus novocanariensis, and Persea indica – together with Prunus lusitanica, Picconia excelsa, and Ilex canariensis. Pleiomeris canariensis and Heberdenia excelsa occur more rarely.

Fayal-brezal heathlands are found from 500 to 1,700 m. The tall shrubs Myrica faya, Erica arborea and Erica scoparia are predominant.

Forests of the endemic Canary Island pine (Pinus canariensis) can be found close to sea level on the southern sides of the islands, and from 1,200 to 2,400 m on the northern slopes.

Montane shrublands inhabit the highest elevations on La Palma and Tenerife.

== Fauna ==
Birds endemic to the ecoregion include Bolle's pigeon (Columba bollii), laurel pigeon (Columba junoniae), Tenerife blue chaffinch (Fringilla teydea), western Canary Islands chiffchaff (Phylloscopus canariensis canariensis), and Tenerife goldcrest (Regulus regulus teneriffae).

The Madeira pipistrelle (Pipistrellus maderensis) is a Macaronesian endemic bat, and Canary big-eared bat (Plecotus teneriffae) is a Canary Islands endemic.

== Protected areas ==
2,417 km^{2}, or 52%, of the ecoregion is in protected areas.

Protected areas include Caldera de Taburiente National Park on La Palma (46.9 km^{2}), Garajonay National Park on La Gomera (39.86 km^{2}), and Teide National Park on Tenerife (18.99 km^{2}).
