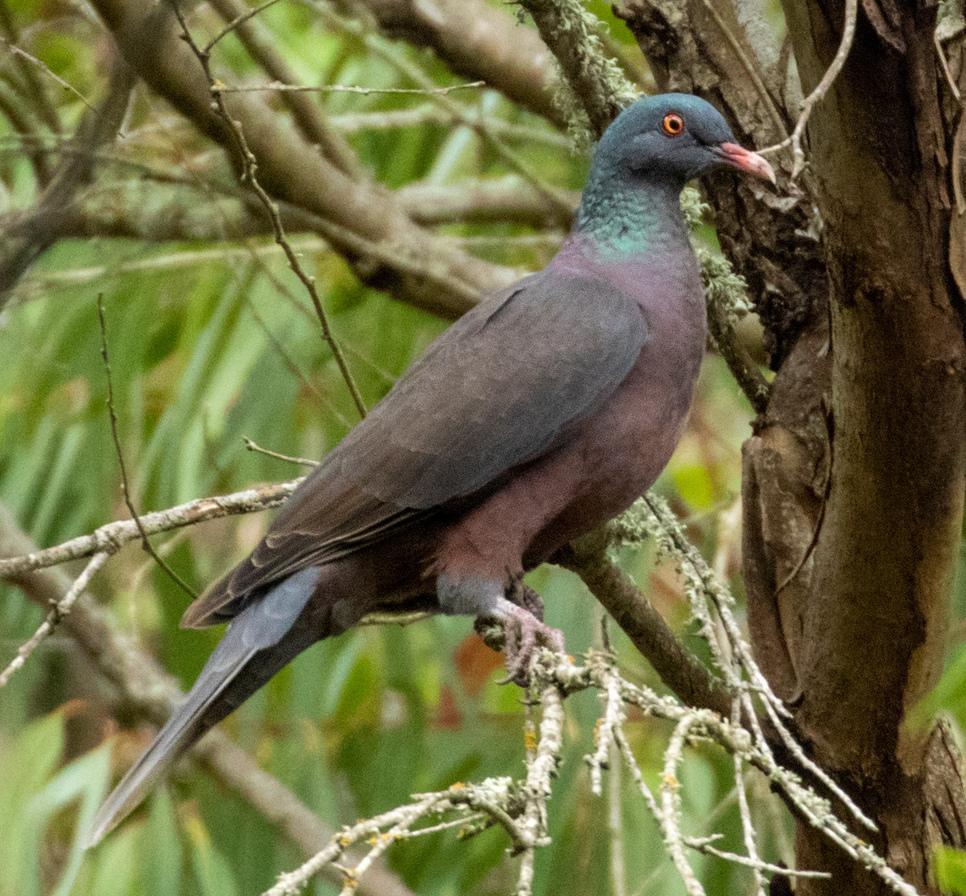

Conservation status
- Near Threatened (IUCN 3.1)

- Threatened (ESA)

Scientific classification
- Kingdom: Animalia
- Phylum: Chordata
- Class: Aves
- Order: Columbiformes
- Family: Columbidae
- Genus: Columba
- Species: C. junoniae

Binomial name
- Columba junoniae Hartert, 1916

= Laurel pigeon =

Species of bird

The laurel pigeon or white-tailed laurel pigeon (Columba junoniae) is a species of bird in the genus Columba in the family Columbidae (doves and pigeons). It is endemic to the Canary Islands, Spain, and resides in laurel forest habitat. It is the animal symbol of the island of La Gomera. It is a pigeon which is endemic to some Canary islands. Its close relative and probable ancestor is the common wood pigeon.

== Description ==
The laurel pigeon is a dark brown and grey bird of 40 cm; it resembles a very dark wood pigeon. The underparts are reddish, and the tail is pale grey with a broad, whitish terminal band. Extensive green gloss to rear crown and hindneck becoming pink on the upper mantle. The bill is pink with a white tip, and the eye is orange in colour. The similar Canarian species, the Bolle's pigeon or dark-tailed laurel pigeon Columba bollii has a pale grey subterminal band and blackish terminal band to tail.

The flight is quick and performed by regular beats. An occasional sharp flick of the wings is characteristic of pigeons in general. Often, the bird takes off with a loud clattering. The call is a hoarse hiccuped cooing.

== Ecology ==
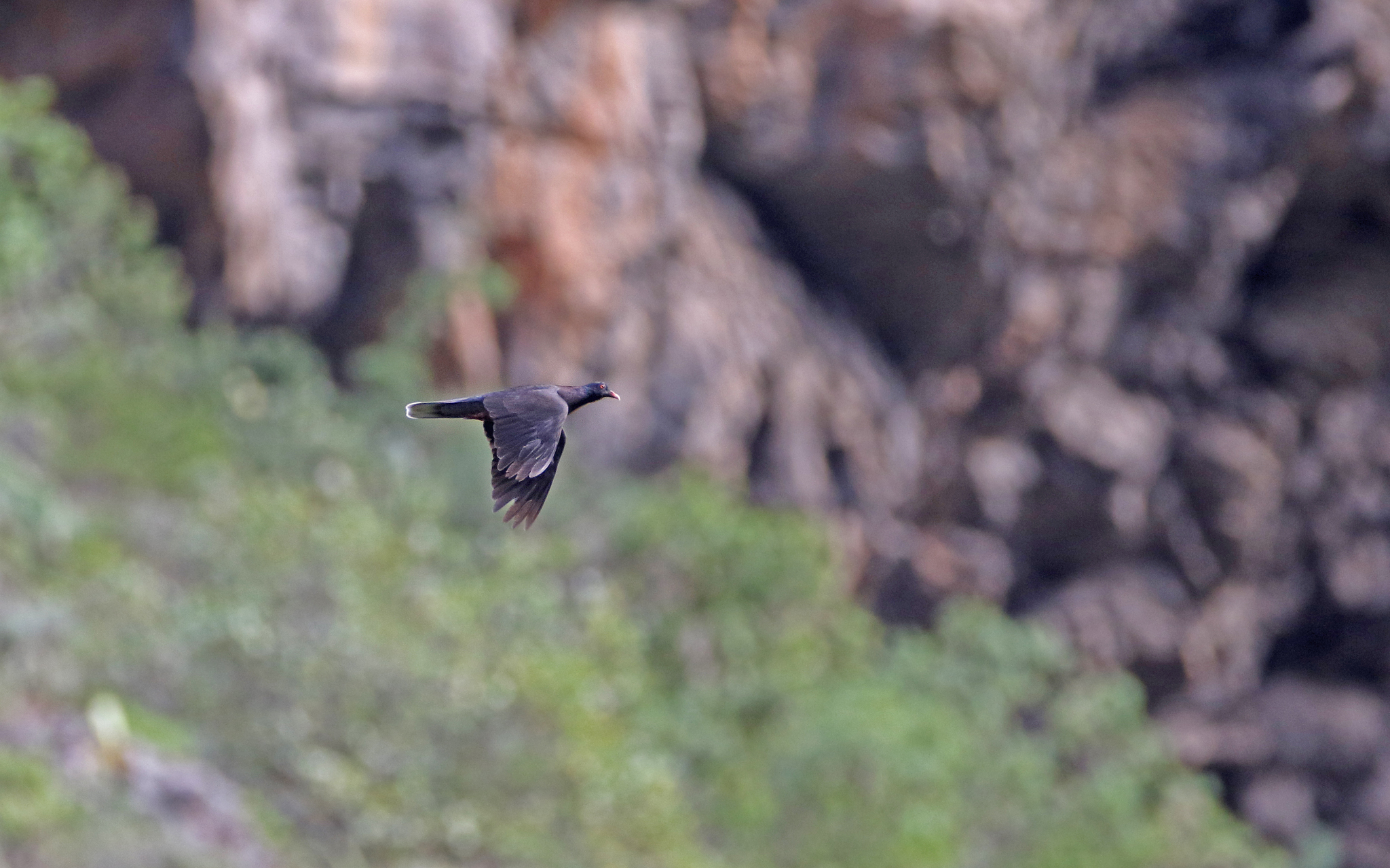
In flight

It prefers areas with steep slopes, escarpments and gullies, where it occurs in dry forest, laurel forest and Canary pine forest, as well as cultivated areas. Nests are on the ground - in fissures, holes or small ledges, at the bases of trees, and under rocks or fallen tree trunks - in steep, rocky, shady areas with abundant shrubby vegetation. The breeding season varies between islands, but extends from January to September, with a peak between April–June. At least on Tenerife, breeding success appears to be low, as a consequence of intense nest predation.

Pigeons can breed from their first year, and nesting occurs throughout the year, although mainly from February to June. The displays are similar to those of the common wood pigeon; the male climbs quickly in flight, gives a loud wing-clap, and then glides down with his wings and tail spread. The display may be repeated two or three times before the bird returns to a perch. On the ground the male performs a bowing display with his neck inflated to show off the iridescent neck patches; meanwhile, the tail is raised, fanned, then closed again. This display is usually accompanied by calling. The nest is a typical pigeon construction, a flimsy structure of twigs and grasses usually placed high in the floor of canyon walls with much vegetation. Nestled among the crevices in rocks, in gullies of the hills. The usual clutch has one smooth white egg. Breeding success and nest predation have effects on the two Canarian endemic pigeons, Bolle's laurel pigeon Columba bollii and white-tailed laurel pigeon Columba junoniae. Nest predation was the more important cause of nesting failure of both species (88%), but principally affected the white-tailed laurel pigeon. It showed a greater predation on the ground than in trees and a lower predation in the February–March period than in June–July and September-October. The abundance of predators, estimated by bait consumption, showed a similar seasonal pattern, while fruit availability decreased over time from the first to the third period. Predators identified by automatic cameras showed that the black rat Rattus rattus was the major nest predator of both pigeons. These general patterns of nest predation affect the white-tailed laurel pigeon which breeds on the ground mainly during April–July, much more than Bolle's laurel pigeon, which breeds in trees especially in February–June. All seems to indicate that rats are the key factor causing the scarcity of the white-tailed laurel pigeon on Tenerife.

The laurel pigeon is exclusively herbivorous. Nearly 60% of its diet is fruit, with most of the rest being leaves, and just 1% is flowers. The fruits of Til, Azores Laurel and Persea indica, and the fruits and leaves of small-leaved holly are the most frequently detected food items. Most seeds pass through the digestive system intact, apart from those of Azores Laurel, which are usually damaged. Fruit is the main component of the diet when it is readily available in autumn and winter, and leaves are consumed in spring and summer when fruits are scarce. In one study, 27% of the leaves consumed came from native trees, especially Small-leaved Holly, 61% from herbs and shrubs, and nearly 10% from introduced trees, mainly apples and peaches. This pigeon will feed in agricultural areas, where cabbage is the most commonly taken crop plant.

However, when the fruit crop of Til and Azores Laurel is poor, large numbers of pigeons may leave the forest to feed on cabbage, flowering cherries and vine shoots. Competition for food with rats can be significant in parts of the island.

== Distribution and habitat ==
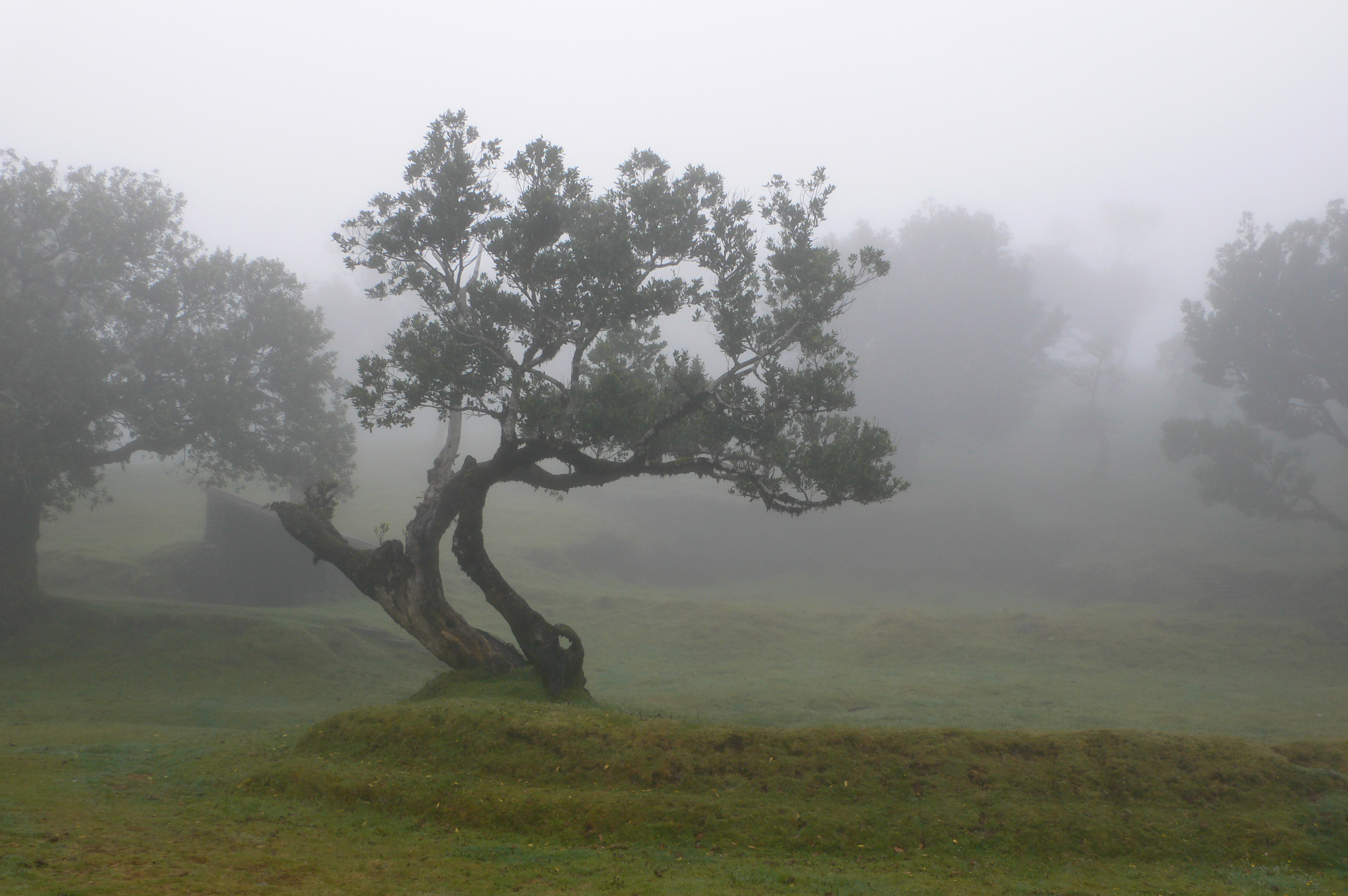
Macaronesian Laurel forest

The laurel pigeon is endemic to the mountainous subtropical Atlantic west Canary islands, where it occurs on the islands of La Palma, La Gomera, Tenerife and El Hierro. In the 1980s, the population was estimated at 1,200-1,480 individuals, but more recent surveys have shown that it is more numerous, and more widely distributed. The largest subpopulation is found on La Palma, where it occurs across much of the northern half of the island. The species is common on La Gomera, where it is found primarily in the north, and also occurs patchily on the northern slopes of Tenerife. It has recently also been recorded on El Hierro; however, breeding there has not yet been confirmed3,4. Although the species was recently suspected to be declining on Tenerife. It mainly occurs on the northern slopes of the mountains, but smaller numbers are found in the south where suitable patches of laurel forest remain. Bones similar to those of a laurel pigeon have been found on neighbouring Gran Canaria, but it is unclear whether these remains stem from the white-tailed laurel pigeon or from Bolle's pigeon. A program to (re)introduce the white-tailed laurel pigeon to this island commenced in 2012.

The natural habitat is tall laurisilva forest or dense tree heaths which are cloud-covered for much of the year. The forests consist mainly of Azores laurel, Oreodaphne foetens, til, Madeira mahogany, Canary laurel, faya, lily of the valley tree and the picconia. The Trocaz pigeon prefers primary forests, but secondary growth is used for feeding, and agricultural land is also visited, especially at times of fruit shortage. Most of the pigeons are found below 1000 m (3300 ft), and their prime environment appears to be steep ravine-indented slopes along artificial watercourses, with the occasional large dead laurel tree and much tree heath. This species is highly mobile between different areas at different times of year.

It was very abundant when the islands were first colonised by humans, but was extirpated. The losses on the islands were largely due to deforestation for wood and to create agricultural and grazing land. The major cause of its population decline is habitat loss from forest clearance, but hunting and nest predation by introduced species and rats were also contributory factors. Protection of the laurel forests and an effective ban on hunting could enable numbers to increase, although this species is still declining and endangered.

The exclusion of livestock from the native forest allows it to regenerate and create more suitable habitat. Some illegal hunting and poisoning continue because of the damage this pigeon can do to crops. Perhaps the main limiting factor on the rate at which the pigeon increases its numbers is eggs and young being taken by introduced black rats. It is now classed as Near Threatened on the IUCN Red List, an improvement on its Threatened status in 1988. This species is protected under the European Union Birds Directive, and the laurel forests under the Habitats Directive.

== Taxonomy ==
The genus Columba is the largest within the pigeon family, and has the widest distribution. Its members are typically pale grey or brown, often with white head or neck markings or iridescent green or purple patches on the neck and breast. The neck feathers may be stiffened and aligned to form grooves. One of several subgroups within Columba consists of the widespread Eurasian common wood pigeon, Bolle's pigeon, the Trocaz pigeon, and the African Afep pigeon. The three Macaronesian endemic pigeons, this species, Bolle's and Trocaz, are thought to be derived from isolated island populations of C. palumbus.

The Atlantic archipelagos of the Canaries, Azores, and Madeira have a volcanic origin and they have never been part of a continent. The formation of Madeira started in the Miocene and the island was substantially complete by 700,000 years ago. At various times in the past, the major islands of these archipelagos were all colonised by ancestral wood pigeons, which evolved on their respective islands in isolation from the mainland populations. Mitochondrial and nuclear DNA sequences suggest that the ancestor of Bolle's pigeon may have arrived in the Canaries about 5 mya, but an older lineage that gave rise to another Canarian endemic, the laurel pigeon, C. junoniae, may date from 20 mya. The most recent wood pigeon arrival on Macaronesia was that which gave rise to the subspecies C. palumbus maderensis.

The Trocaz pigeon was formally described in 1829 by Karl Heineken. He recognised it as different from the now-extinct local form of the Madeiran wood pigeon, a subspecies of the common wood pigeon. This is a monotypic species, although in the past the Canarian Bolle's pigeon was sometimes regarded as a subspecies of the Trocaz pigeon.
