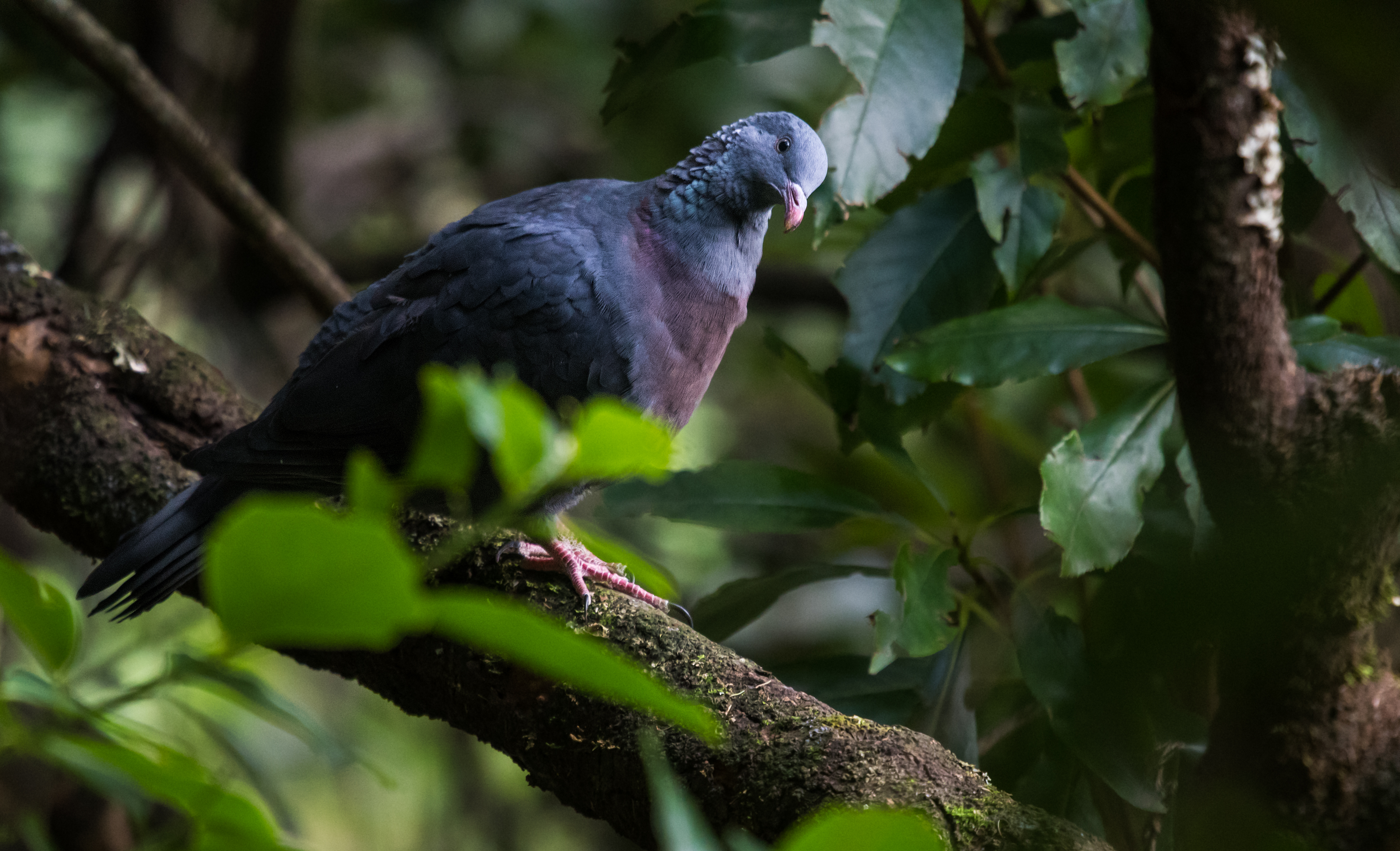

Conservation status
- Least Concern (IUCN 3.1)

Scientific classification
- Kingdom: Animalia
- Phylum: Chordata
- Class: Aves
- Order: Columbiformes
- Family: Columbidae
- Genus: Columba
- Species: C. trocaz

Binomial name
- Columba trocaz Heineken, 1829
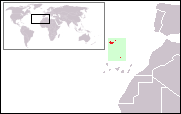
- Location map

Synonyms
- Columba laurivora Webb, Berthelot & Moquin-Tandon, 1841; Trocaza bouvryi Bonaparte, 1855

= Trocaz pigeon =

Species of bird

The trocaz pigeon, Madeira laurel pigeon or long-toed pigeon (Columba trocaz) is a pigeon endemic to the island of Madeira, Portugal. It is a mainly grey bird with a pinkish breast; its silvery neck patch and lack of white wing markings distinguish it from its close relative and probable ancestor, the common wood pigeon. Its call is a characteristic six-note cooing, weaker and lower-pitched than that of the wood pigeon. Despite its bulky, long-tailed appearance, this pigeon has a fast, direct flight.

A scarce resident breeder in laurisilva forests, the trocaz pigeon lays one white egg in a flimsy twig nest. Its numbers fell sharply after human colonisation of the Madeira archipelago, and it vanished altogether from Porto Santo Island. The major cause of its population decline was habitat loss from forest clearance, but hunting and nest predation by introduced rats were also contributory factors. Protection of the laurel forests and a ban on hunting have enabled numbers to increase, so that the species is no longer endangered.

== Description ==
The trocaz pigeon is a rather plain, dark grey bird 40–45 cm (15.7–17.7 in) long with a 68–74 cm (26.8–29.1 in) wingspan. The upper back has a violet sheen, becoming green on the back of the neck, and the neck sides are patterned with silver-white. The tail is blackish with a wide, pale grey band, and the flight feathers are mainly black. The upper breast is pinkish, the eye is yellow, the bill has a yellow tip and a reddish-purple base, and the legs are red. The sexes are similar in appearance, but the juvenile has generally browner plumage, with limited or no development of the silvery neck patch. Its closed wings have a scaly appearance due to pale buff feather edges. The trocaz pigeon's voice is weaker and deeper than that of common wood pigeon, typically consisting of six syllables with the middle pair of notes extended and stressed: uh-uh hrooh-hrooh ho-ho. When flying, it appears heavy and large-tailed, although its flight is rapid and direct.

The common wood pigeon had a poorly defined Madeiran subspecies, Columba palumbus maderensis. This was paler than the trocaz pigeon and had white wing patches and a more extensive green iridescence on the nape, but it became extinct before 1924. Bolle's pigeon is more similar in appearance to the trocaz pigeon, although it lacks the whitish neck patch and has a more extensively pink breast. However, that species is endemic to the Canary Islands, so there is no range overlap. The only other pigeon currently present on Madeira is the feral pigeon; this is slimmer, has more pointed wings and a much smaller tail. It often has dark wing markings, and a lighter flight.

== Taxonomy ==
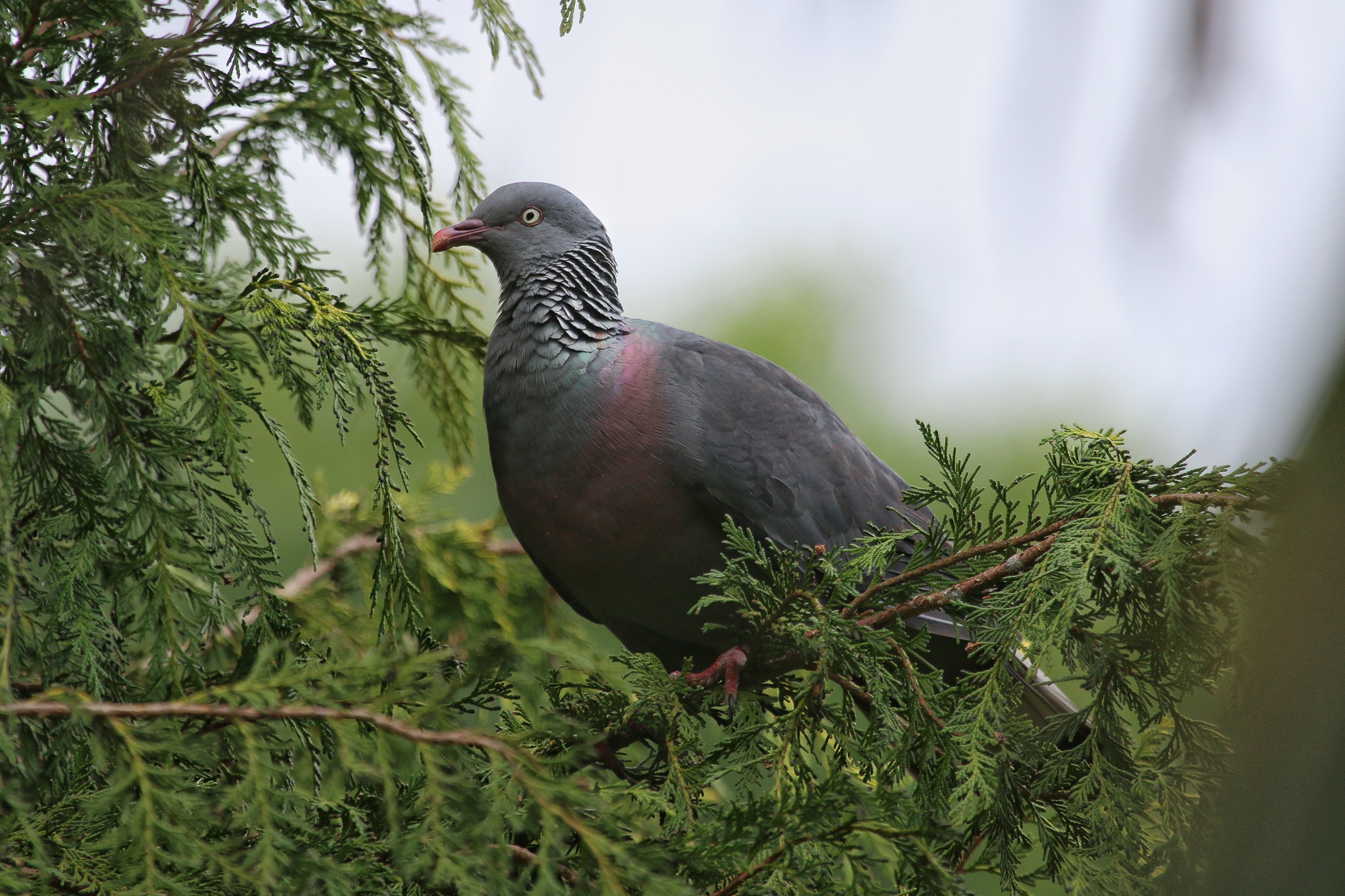
Trocaz Pigeon at Monte Palace Tropical Garden, Madeira on June 8, 2019.

The genus Columba is the largest within the pigeon family, and has the widest distribution. Its members are typically pale grey or brown, often with white head or neck markings or iridescent green or purple patches on the neck and breast. The neck feathers may be stiffened and aligned to form grooves. One of several subgroups within Columba consists of the widespread Eurasian common wood pigeon, Bolle's pigeon, the trocaz pigeon, and the African Afep pigeon. The two Macaronesian endemic pigeons, Bolle's and trocaz, are thought to be derived from isolated island populations of C. palumbus.

The Atlantic archipelagos of the Canaries, Azores, and Madeira have a volcanic origin and they have never been part of a continent. The formation of Madeira started in the Miocene and the island was substantially complete by 700,000 years ago. At various times in the past, the major islands of these archipelagos were all colonised by ancestral wood pigeons, which evolved on their respective islands in isolation from the mainland populations. Mitochondrial and nuclear DNA sequences suggest that the ancestor of Bolle's pigeon may have arrived in the Canaries about 5 mya, but an older lineage that gave rise to another Canarian endemic, the laurel pigeon, C. junoniae, may date from 20 mya. The most recent wood pigeon arrival on Madeira was that which gave rise to the subspecies C. palumbus maderensis.

The trocaz pigeon was formally described in 1829 by Karl Heineken, a German medical doctor and ornithologist who was living on Madeira at the time. He recognised it as different from the now-extinct local form of the common wood pigeon, which he called the "Palumbus", and noted that the two pigeons never interbred or habitually associated together. He suggested designating the new species by its local name, "trocaz". Trocaz is a variant of Portuguese torcaz, the common wood pigeon; both words are ultimately derived from the Latin torquis, a collar, and refer to the bird's coloured neck patches. This is a monotypic species, although in the past Bolle's pigeon was sometimes regarded as a subspecies of the trocaz pigeon.

== Distribution and habitat ==
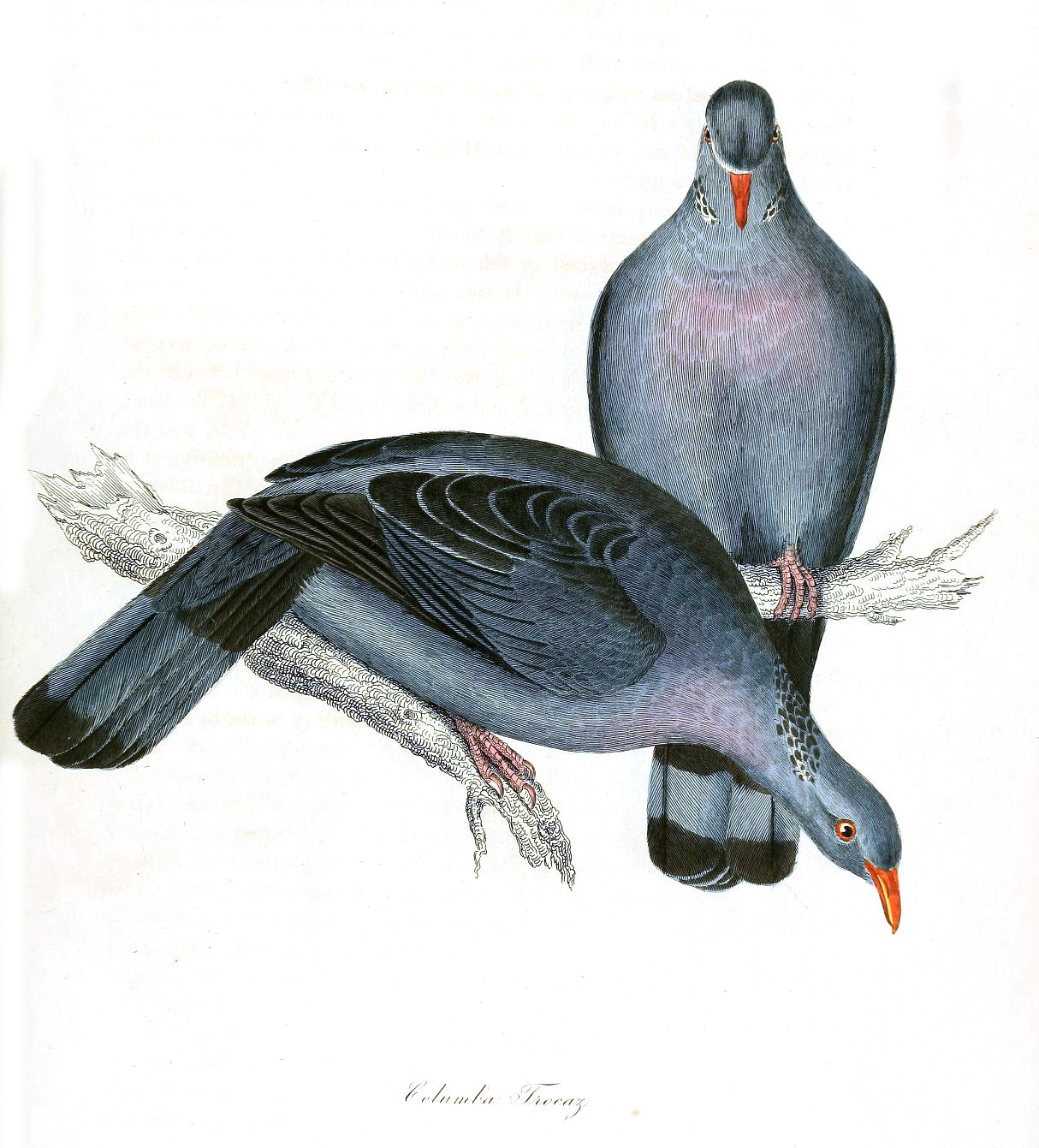
Old illustration based on a specimen obtained by Mr Carruthers of Madeira in 1827

The trocaz pigeon is endemic to the mountainous subtropical Atlantic main island of Madeira, although it formerly also bred on the neighbouring Porto Santo Island. It mainly occurs on the northern slopes of the mountains, but smaller numbers are found in the south where suitable patches of laurel forest remain.

The natural habitat is tall laurisilva forest or dense tree heaths which are cloud-covered for much of the year. The forests consist mainly of laurel, Ocotea foetens, Madeira mahogany, Canary laurel, faya, lily-of-the-valley-tree and Picconia excelsa. The trocaz pigeon prefers primary forests, but secondary growth is used for feeding, and agricultural land is also visited, especially at times of fruit shortage. Most of the pigeons are found below 1,000 m (3,300 ft), and their prime environment appears to be steep ravine-indented slopes along artificial watercourses, with the occasional large dead laurel tree and much tree heath. This species is highly mobile between different areas at different times of year.

== Behaviour ==
=== Breeding ===
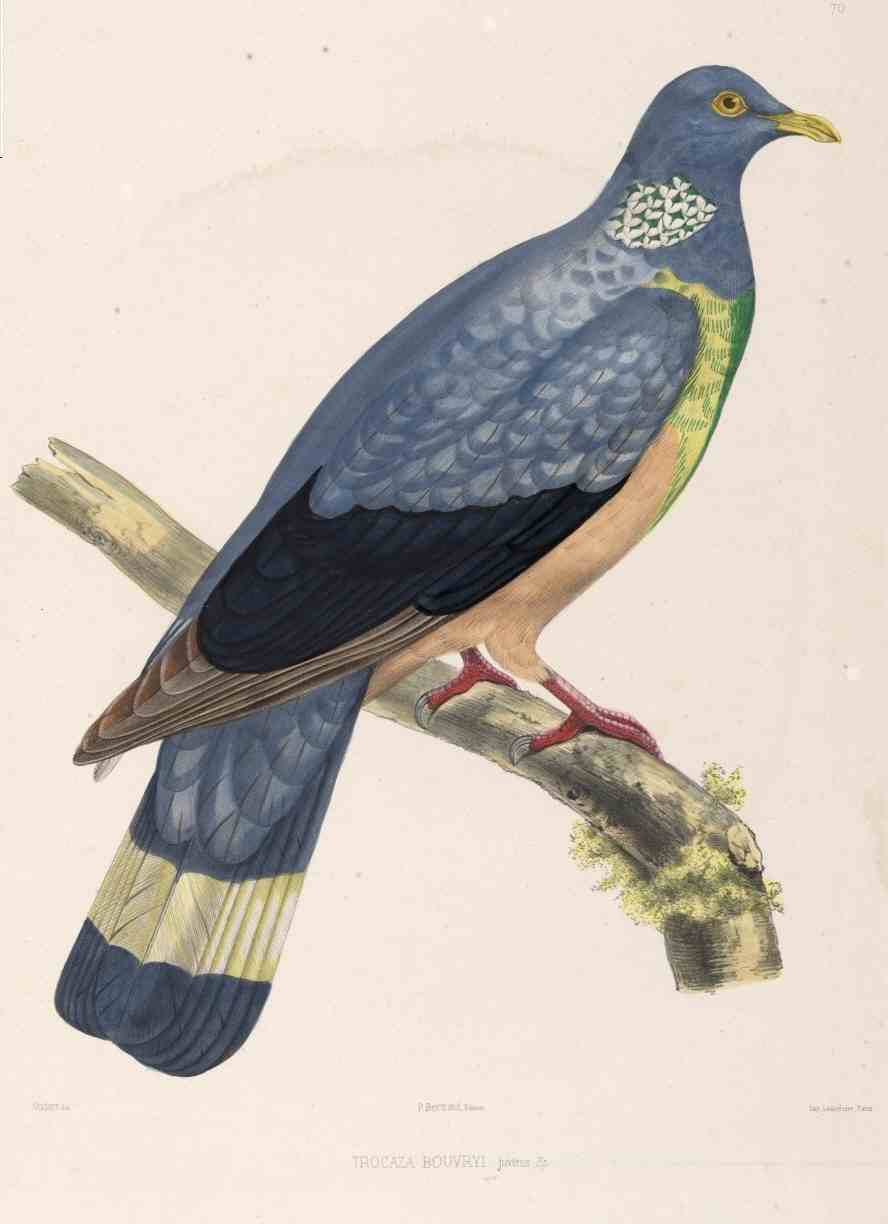
C L Bonaparte described the trocaz pigeon as Trocaza bouvryi in 1855

Pigeons can breed from their first year, and nesting occurs throughout the year, although mainly from February to June. The displays are similar to those of the common wood pigeon; the male climbs quickly in flight, gives a loud wing-clap, and then glides down with his wings and tail spread. The display may be repeated two or three times before the bird returns to a perch. On the ground the male performs a bowing display with his neck inflated to show off the iridescent neck patches; meanwhile, the tail is raised, fanned, then closed again. This display is usually accompanied by calling. The nest is a typical pigeon construction, a flimsy structure of twigs and grasses usually placed high in a tree in thick forest. One, rarely two, smooth white eggs are laid, although no nest with two chicks has ever been found. The eggs, 3.0–5.0 cm (1.2–2.0 in) in size, are incubated for 19–20 days; the young are able to fly in 28 days, and are independent within eight weeks.

=== Feeding ===
The trocaz pigeon is exclusively herbivorous. Nearly 60% of its diet is fruit, with most of the rest being leaves, and just 1% is flowers. The fruits of Til, Azores Laurel and Persea indica, and the fruits and leaves of small-leaved holly are the most frequently detected food items. Most seeds pass through the digestive system intact, apart from those of Azores Laurel, which are usually damaged. Fruit is the main component of the diet when it is readily available in autumn and winter, and leaves are consumed in spring and summer when fruits are scarce. In one study, 27% of the leaves consumed came from native trees, especially Small-leaved Holly, 61% from herbs and shrubs, and nearly 10% from introduced trees, mainly apples and peaches. This pigeon will feed in agricultural areas, where cabbage is the most commonly taken crop plant. Pigeon faeces from agricultural areas contain few native plants, and samples from forests have few crop species, so some individual birds may concentrate on crops. Feeding in cultivated land is commonest in winter, when fruit is readily available, so it appears not to be a shortage of natural foods that causes them to leave the forest, but is mostly opportunistic, resulting from the birds' movements through nearby forest. However, when the fruit crop of Til and Azores Laurel is poor, large numbers of pigeons may leave the forest to feed on cabbage, flowering cherries and vine shoots. Competition for food with rats can be significant in parts of the island.

== Status ==
The trocaz pigeon formerly bred on both the main island of Madeira and nearby Porto Santo Island. It was very abundant when the islands were first colonised by humans, but was extirpated on Porto Santo, and by 1986 had declined to about 2,700 birds. Hunting was banned in that year, and there are now between 7,500 and 10,000 individuals in approximately 160 square kilometres (62 sq mi) of suitable habitat. The losses on the two islands, the only inhabited ones in the archipelago, were largely the result of deforestation for wood and to create agricultural and grazing land.

The exclusion of livestock from the native forest allows the forest to regenerate and create more suitable habitat. Some illegal hunting and poisoning continues because of the damage this pigeon can do to crops, and the government allowed a cull in 2004. Perhaps the main limiting factor on the rate at which the pigeon increases its numbers is predation by introduced black rats on its eggs and young. The Madeira Nature Park has a management plan for the trocaz pigeon, and it is hoped that an education campaign and the promotion of nonlethal bird control methods may reduce persecution. Its increasing population means that it is now classed as Least Concern on the IUCN Red List, an improvement on its Threatened status in 1988. This species is protected under the European Union Birds Directive, and the laurel forests under the Habitats Directive.

== Cited text ==
- Gibbs, David; Barnes, Eustace; Cox, John (2000). Pigeons and Doves: A Guide to the Pigeons and Doves of the World. Robertsbridge, Sussex: Pica Press. ISBN 978-1-873403-60-0.
- Mullarney, Killian; Svensson, Lars; Zetterstrom, Dan; Grant, Peter (1999). Collins Bird Guide. London: Collins. ISBN 978-0-00-219728-1.
- Snow, David (1998). Perrins, Christopher M (ed.). The Birds of the Western Palearctic concise edition (2 volumes). Oxford: Oxford University Press. ISBN 978-0-19-854099-1.
