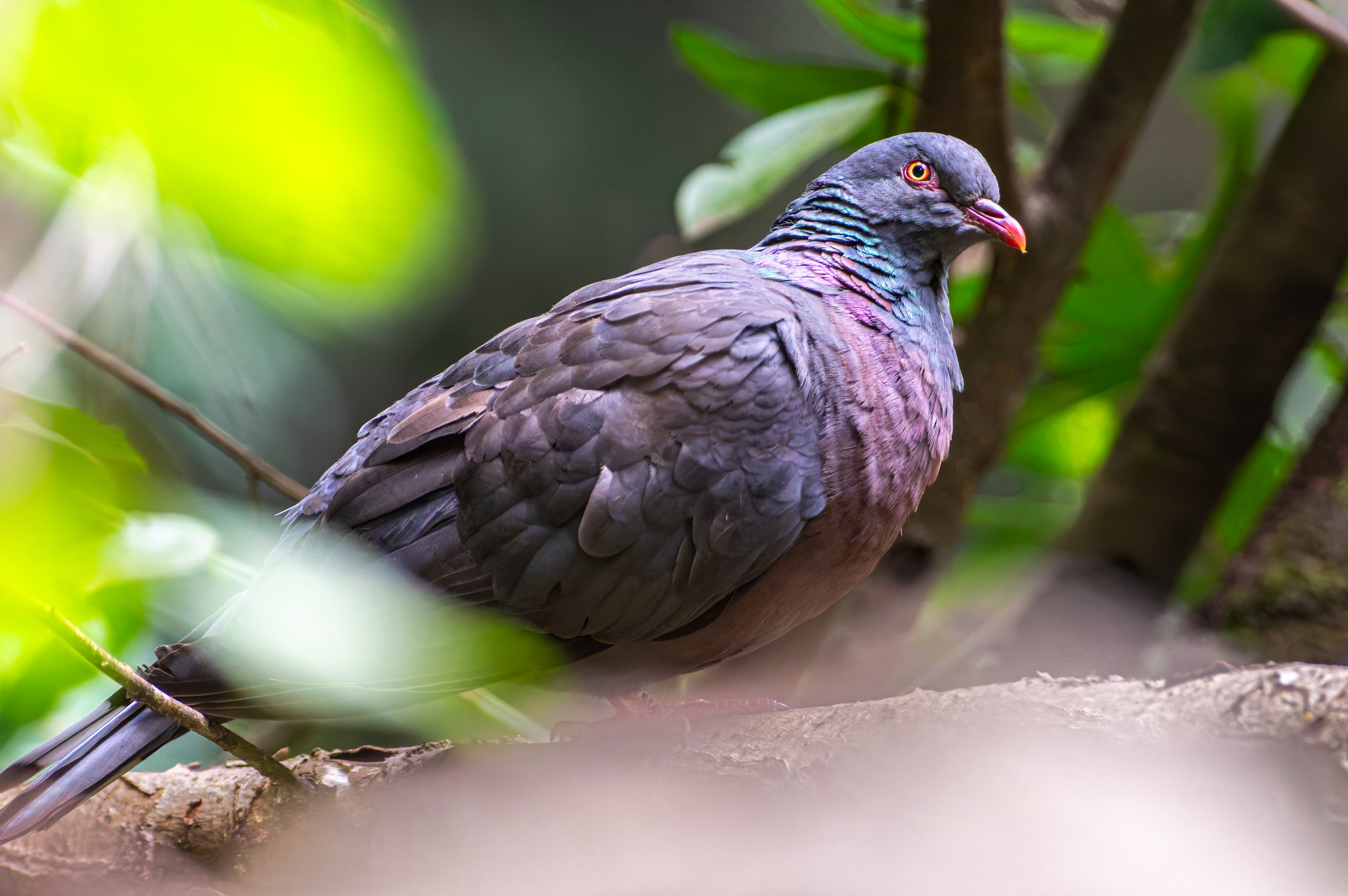

Conservation status
- Least Concern (IUCN 3.1)

Scientific classification
- Kingdom: Animalia
- Phylum: Chordata
- Class: Aves
- Order: Columbiformes
- Family: Columbidae
- Genus: Columba
- Species: C. bollii

Binomial name
- Columba bollii Godman, 1872

= Bolle's pigeon =

Species of bird

Bolle's pigeon, Bolle's laurel pigeon or dark-tailed laurel pigeon (Columba bollii) is a species of pigeon in the genus Columba that is endemic to the Canary Islands, Spain. This bird is named after the German naturalist Carl Bolle, who was the first to distinguish it from the laurel pigeon. This wood pigeon is endemic to the laurel forest habitat.

== Description ==
Larger than the common pigeon, a length of 36 cm to 38 cm. It is a large dark grey pigeon. At 37–40 cm, it looks like a very dark wood pigeon. Its dark grey, rather than brown, plumage and the dark bands on the grey tail distinguish it from the other pigeon endemic to the Canary Islands, the laurel pigeon. It is a basically dark grey bird, with a pinkish breast. It lacks any white markings, which together with its darker plumage distinguishes it from the other species.

With red beak, most intense at the tip. Head relatively large, slate grey, in males, with bluish or greenish metallic side of the neck and back of neck. Eyes rounded, yellow to orange with black pupil and lightly framed by a thin, flesh-coloured eye ring. Back, rump and wings brownish grey, which in adult males with metallic blue shoulders. The primary and secondary remiges are blackish brown. The chest, blue-dark grey, stained purple in males. Belly is pale grey pastel. Females, less conspicuous, do not hold the highlights, reflections and metallic hues, and even the colours are more 'grey' and off.

Mainly dark grey with blacker flight feathers and paler grey tail with dark terminal band, hindneck with green and pink gloss and reddish tinge to breast. Only likely to be confused with white-tailed laurel pigeon Columba junoniae or dark feral pigeon. The voice is a guttural mournful cooing. Hints: Look for birds flying low and fast over laurel forest. Its flight is quick, performed by regular beats, with an occasional sharp flick of the wings, characteristic of pigeons in general. It takes off with a loud clattering.

== Ecology ==
Breeding occurs in trees especially in February–June. The nest, somewhat more elaborate than those of other pigeons, is built on the upper branches of a tree, with pieces of sticks and twigs, forming the classic platform, which is usually lined with mosses and lichens briefly. It lays one or two eggs. The egg hatch after a shared incubation of eighteen days. Frugivore which eat drupes or fruits of Azores laurel (Laurus azorica), Viñátigo (Persea indica), Til (Ocotea foetens) and fruit of faya (Myrica faya) but can consume alternately diverse sweet acorns, hazelnuts, other nuts, and berries.

== Distribution and population ==
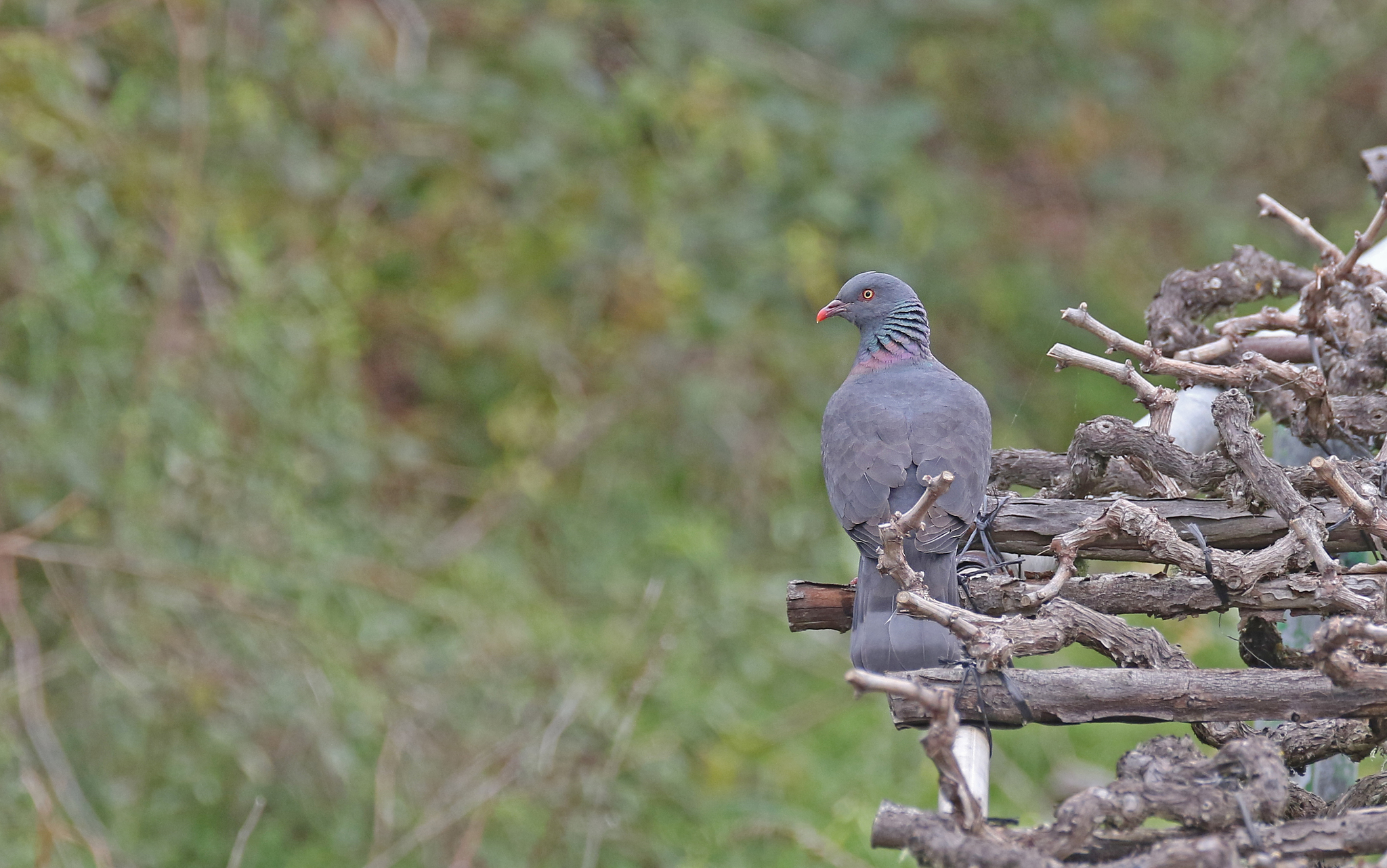

It is a resident breeder in the mountain laurisilva forest zone. Bolle's pigeon builds a stick nest in a tree, laying one white egg. Columba bollii occurs on Tenerife particularly at Anaga and Teno, La Palma in a restricted area of the north-east), La Gomera in Garajonay National Park with some birds outside the park, and El Hierro where it occurs in Golfo and Sabinosa in the Canary Islands, Spain. It may formerly have occurred on Gran Canaria, as bones similar to those of a laurel pigeon have been found and there is a possible sight record from the late 19th century. It was common in the past, but disappeared from many areas owing to clearance of laurel forest in the islands. More recently the rate of laurel forest clearance has been slowed or stopped. Population estimates for the species are 1,160-1,315 birds in 1980, 6,000 individuals in 2001, and 5,000-20,000 most recently. Whether these figures reveal genuine population increases is unclear, but the area of occupied territory appears to be expanding and despite several potential threats the population is at least stable, probably increasing.

In 2007, the species was estimated by SEO Sociedad Española de Ornitología, BirdLife in Spain to number 5,000-20,000 individuals.

It occurs in dense laurel forest in mountainous areas, especially in ravines; also in heath of Myrica faya and Erica arborea, and sometimes in rather open areas, e.g. cultivation. It spends the hottest part of the day in deep shade. It feeds mainly on fruit but also takes grain and occasionally buds, leaves and shoots. It will gather in large concentrations on fruiting trees, plucking berries from the tree but also feeding on the ground. It makes some altitudinal movements to take advantage of ripe cereals and fruit at lower elevations in late summer.

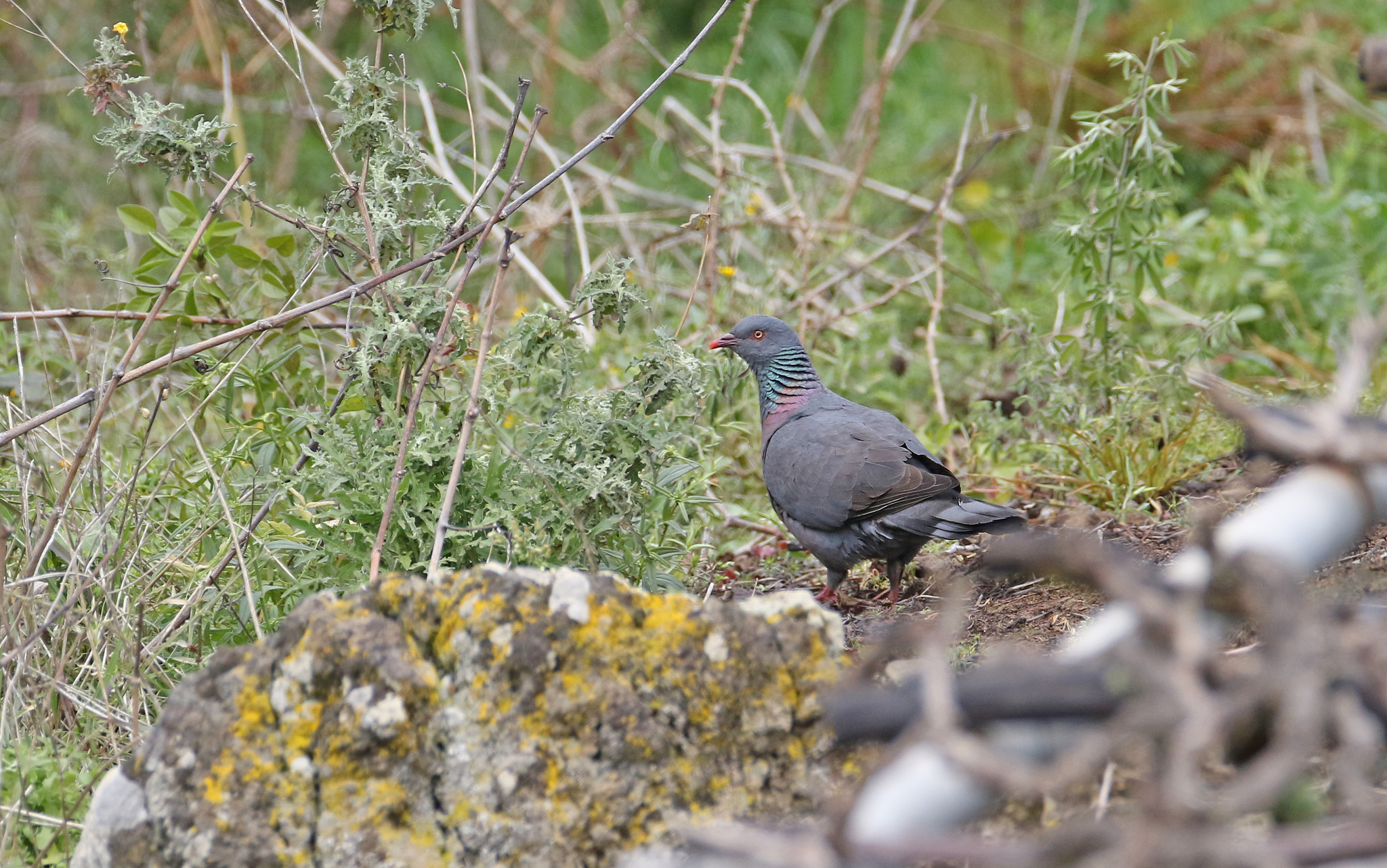

Threats Historical declines resulted from intensive exploitation of laurel forests. The extent of forest loss has slowed, although fragmentation has continued in some areas as forests are exploited for poles and tool handles. A small amount of illegal hunting occurs at drinking sites. As it is a tree-nesting species, predation by introduced mammals including rats is of less significance than for C. junoniae but it remains a potential threat, the impact of which has not been fully assessed. Grazing pressure from sheep is leading to habitat degradation on La Gomera and at El Hierro. Forest fires also pose a moderate threat to its habitat. Recreational activities cause some disturbance in the breeding season. The species is potentially threatened by outbreaks of Newcastle Disease and Tuberculosis.

The natural habitat is tall laurisilva forest or dense tree heath Erica arborea which is cloud-covered for much of the year. The forests consist mainly of Azores laurel Laurus azorica, Til Ocotea foetens, Viñátigo Persea indica, Barbusano Apollonias barbujana, Faya Myrica faya, Lily of the Valley Tree and Picconia Picconia excelsa. This species is highly mobile between different areas at different times of year.

It was very abundant when the islands were first colonised by humans, but became rare due to overhunting and habitat loss. The losses on the islands were largely due to deforestation for wood and to create agricultural and grazing land.

The exclusion of livestock from the native forest allows it to regenerate and create more suitable habitat. Some illegal hunting and poisoning continues because of the damage this pigeon can do to crops. Perhaps the main limiting factor on the rate at which the pigeon increases its numbers is eggs and young being taken by introduced black rats. It is now classed as Least Concern on the IUCN Red List, an improvement on its Threatened status in 1988. This species is protected under the European Union Birds Directive, and the laurel forests under the Habitats Directive.

== Taxonomy ==
The genus Columba is the largest within the pigeon family, and has the widest distribution. Its members are typically pale grey or brown, often with white head or neck markings or iridescent green or purple patches on the neck and breast. The neck feathers may be stiffened and aligned to form grooves. One of several subgroups within Columba consists of the widespread Eurasian common wood pigeon, Bolle's pigeon, the Trocaz pigeon, and the African Afep pigeon. The two Macaronesian endemic pigeons, Bolle's and Trocaz, are thought to be derived from isolated island populations of C. palumbus.

The Atlantic archipelagos of the Canaries, Azores, and Madeira have a volcanic origin and they have never been part of a continent. The formation of Madeira started in the Miocene and the island was substantially complete by 700,000 years ago. At various times in the past, the major islands of these archipelagos were all colonised by ancestral wood pigeons, which evolved on their respective islands in isolation from the mainland populations. Mitochondrial and nuclear DNA sequences suggest that the ancestor of Bolle's pigeon may have arrived in the Canaries about 5 mya, but an older lineage that gave rise to another Canarian endemic, the laurel pigeon, C. junoniae, may date from 20 mya. The most recent wood pigeon arrival on Macaronesia was that which gave rise to the subspecies C. palumbus maderensis.

The Trocaz pigeon was formally described in 1829 by Karl Heineken. He recognised it as different from the now-extinct local form of the Madeiran wood pigeon a sub-species of the common wood pigeon. This is a monotypic species, although in the past the canarian Bolle's pigeon was sometimes regarded as a subspecies of the Trocaz pigeon.
