= Wildlife of Spain =

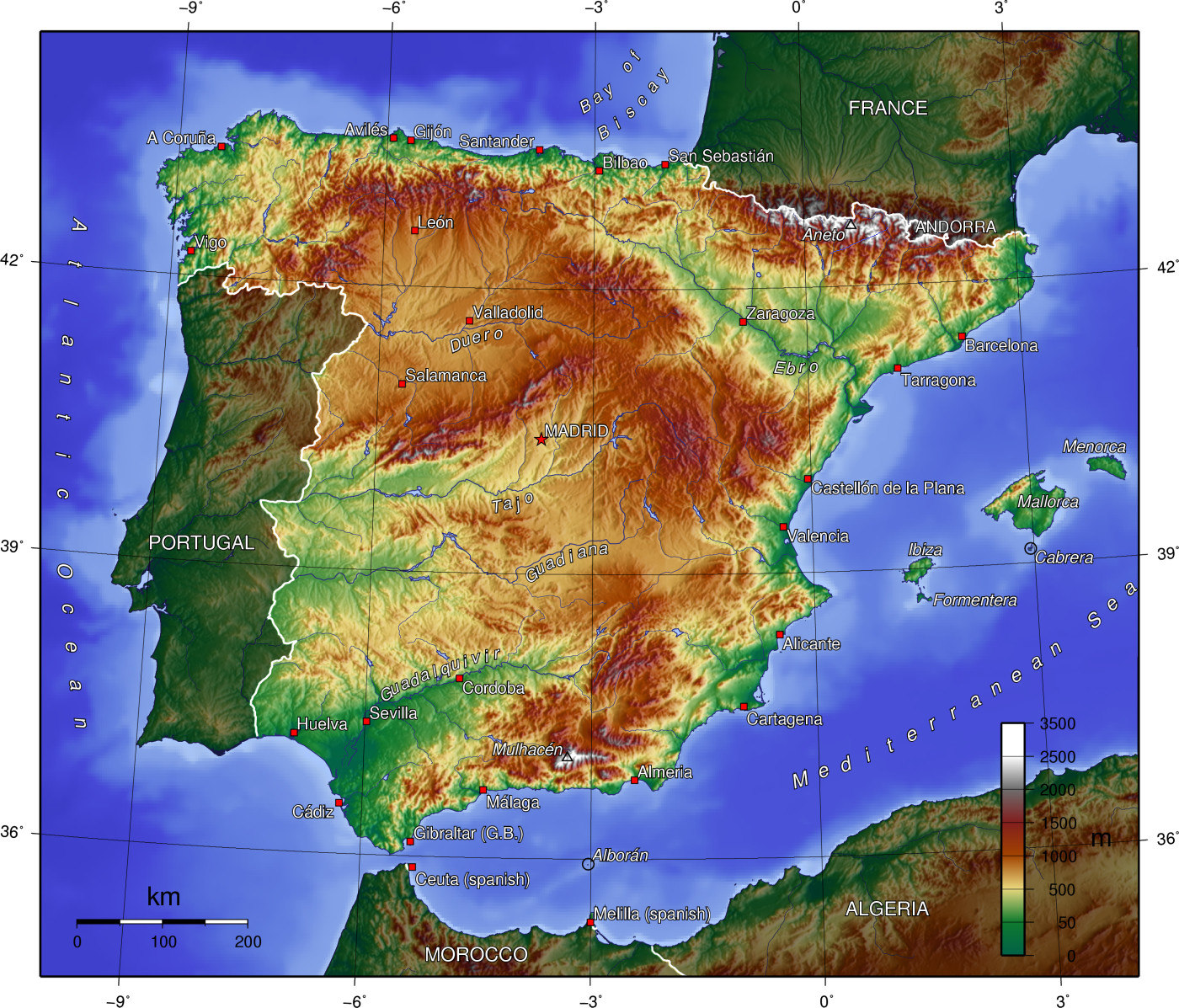
Topographic map of Spain

The wildlife of Spain includes the diverse flora and fauna of Spain. The country located at the south of France has two long coastlines, one on the north on the Cantabrian Sea, another on the East and South East on the Mediterranean Sea, and a smaller one on the west and south west on the Atlantic Ocean, its territory includes a big part of the Iberian Peninsula, the Canary Islands, the Balearic Islands and two enclaves in North Africa, Ceuta and Melilla. (rivers, mountains, coastlines, deserts, basins, oceans, etc.) and the different climate zones, Spain is one of the countries in Europe with the greatest biodiversity.

== Geography ==
Peninsular Spain largely consists of a highland plateau, surrounded and dissected by mountain ranges and rivers.

== Climate ==
Spanish climate map Continental oceanic climate Coastal oceanic climate Subtropical climate Mountain climate Semi-arid steppe climate Continental Mediterranean climate Coastal Mediterranean climate

Much of the country experiences a Mediterranean climate with warm or hot, dry summers and the rainfall falling in winter. A semi-arid climate occurs in the southeastern part of Spain, but is also found in other parts of the country such as the Ebro basin. Here the summers are hot and the winters cool, but there is limited precipitation at any time of year. The northern part of the country experiences an oceanic climate (called as well Cantabrian climate) with both winter and summer temperatures influenced by the proximity to the Cantabrian Sea and rainfall spread throughout the year. The Balearic Islands have a Mediterranean climate, and the Canary Islands are influenced by their oceanic surroundings and proximity to Africa.

== Biodiversity ==
Among European countries, Spain has one of the highest degrees of biodiversity; this is because of its four varied, major biogeographic regions, Atlantic, Alpine, Mediterranean and Macaronesian, and the country is considered to be one of the world's biodiversity hotspots. In connection with Natura 2000, a European Union initiative, 27% of the country is included in national parks, wildlife reserves and other protected areas.

== Flora ==
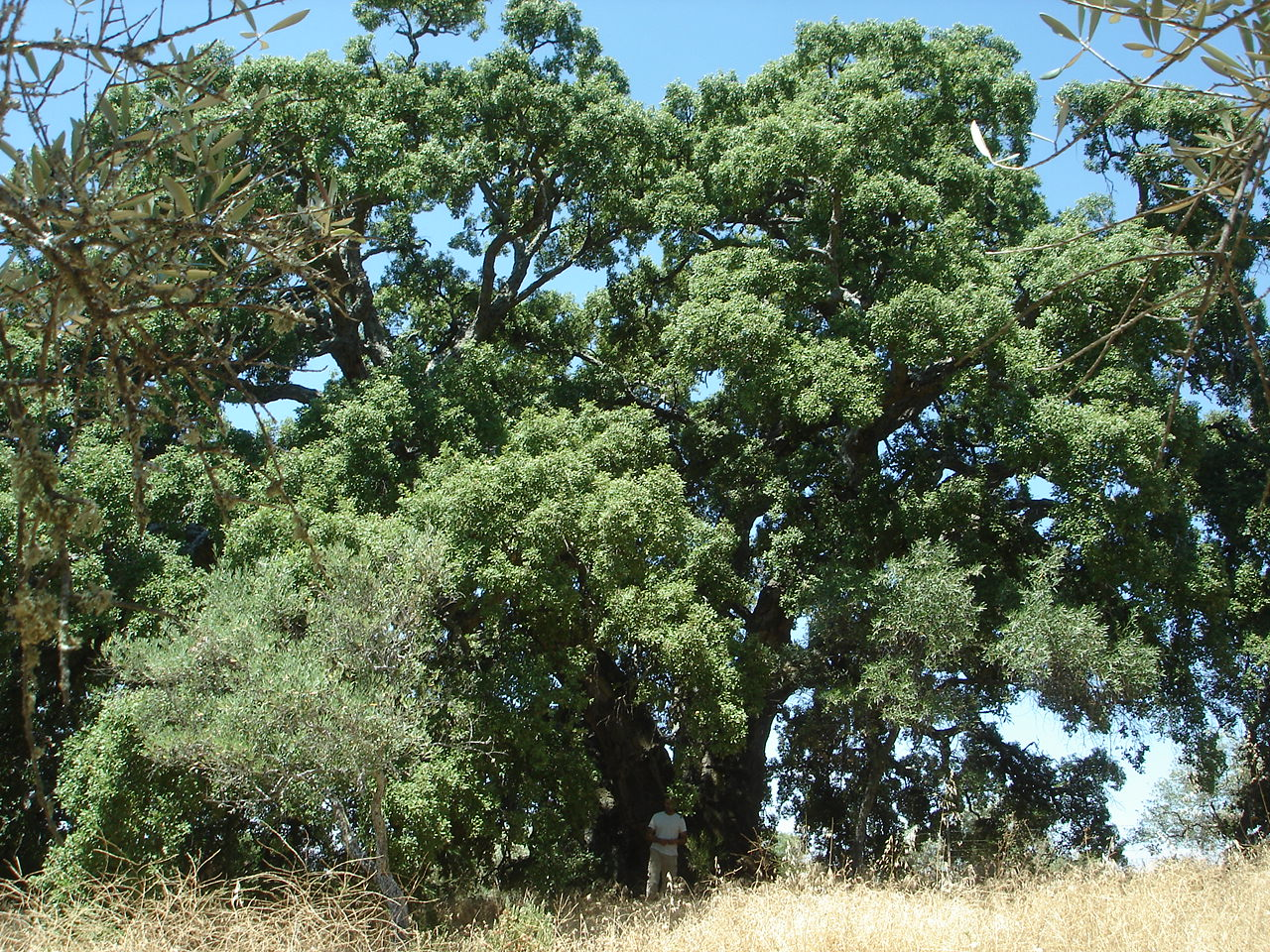
Cork oak woodland in Andalusia

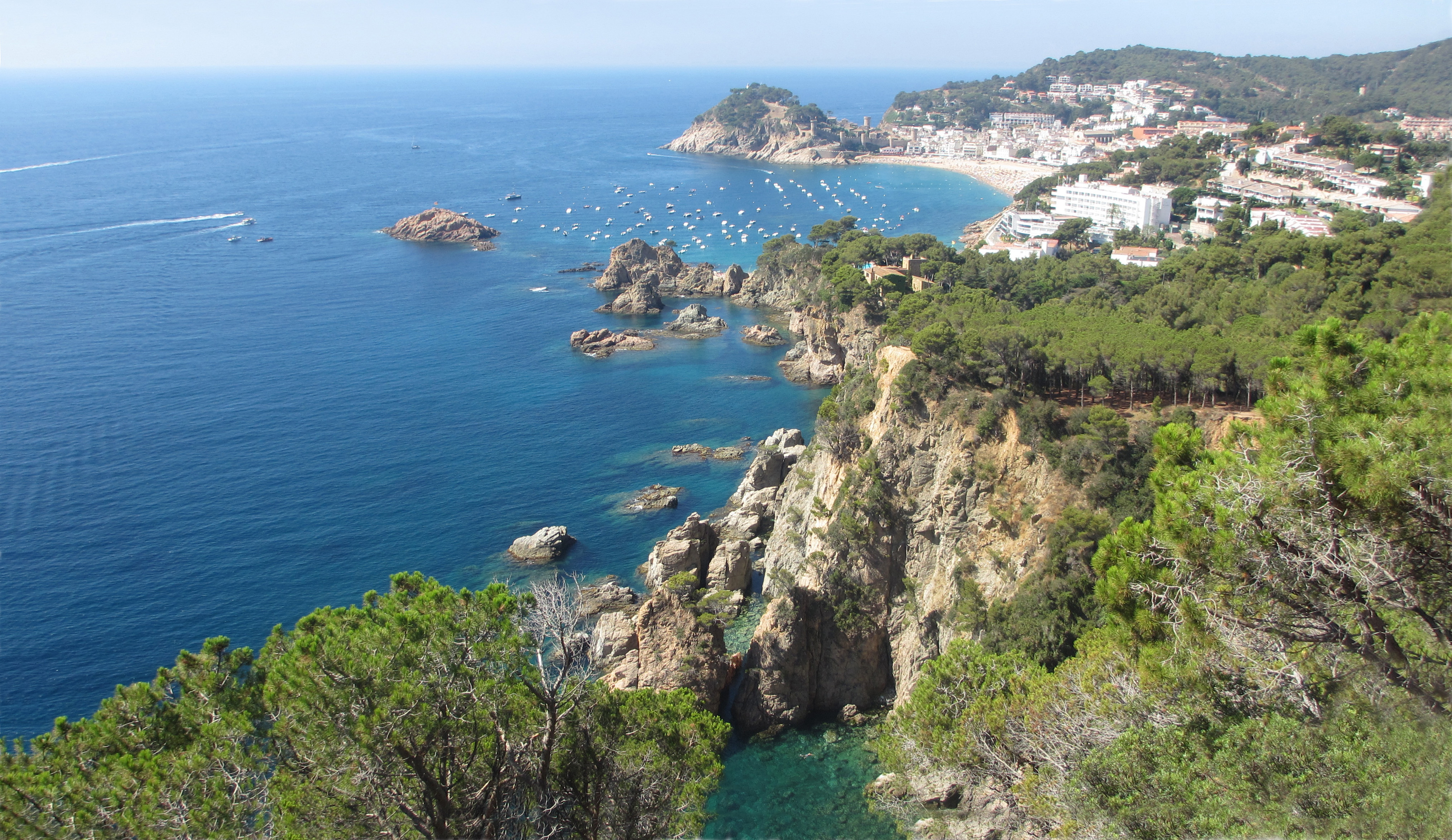
The Mediterranean coast of Spain

Including the mainland and the island groups, Spain has eight to nine thousand species of vascular plants, more than any other country in Europe. Between 20 and 25% of these are endemic to the country and a higher proportion of these are threatened than in any other European country. Although there are no endemic plant families mainland Spain has 822 endemic species, and the Balearic Islands 103.

Most of the plateaus, valleys and plains of the interior used to be clad in sclerophyllous and semi-deciduous forests. These were dominated by holm oak and cork oak, with wild olive and carob in the south, but only remnants of this natural vegetation remain. Much of this terrain is now covered with dense shrubland known as maquis, with scattered low trees, bushes and herbaceous plants. Stone pine and maritime pine are dominant on sandy soils, and Aleppo pine, Kermes oak and juniper in limestone areas.

At higher altitudes, the Pyrenean oak is dominant up to about 1,500 m (5,000 ft) above which Scots pine and juniper take over. In the river valleys, only remnants remain of the natural deciduous woodland of willow, poplar, alder, ash and elm. The coastal part of northwestern Spain has plentiful deciduous forests dominated by common oak, lime, chestnut, elm, ash, maple and hazel, and where the tree cover is lacking, heather and gorse. Some parts in the southeast of the country have a form of subtropical steppe vegetation.

There are certain plant species that occur in the entire Spanish territory, including the archipelagoes, such as the Dryopteris filix-mas, Arum italicum (of the same genus as adder's meat), borage, lamb's quarters, Bermuda grass, Mercurialis annua and Eruca vesicaria. Others are distributed in almost the entire territory except for Lanzarote and Fuerteventura (eastern Canary islands) such as the southern maidenhair fern, maidenhair spleenwort, Cynoglossum creticum (Boraginaceae), and Elymus repens.

== Fauna ==
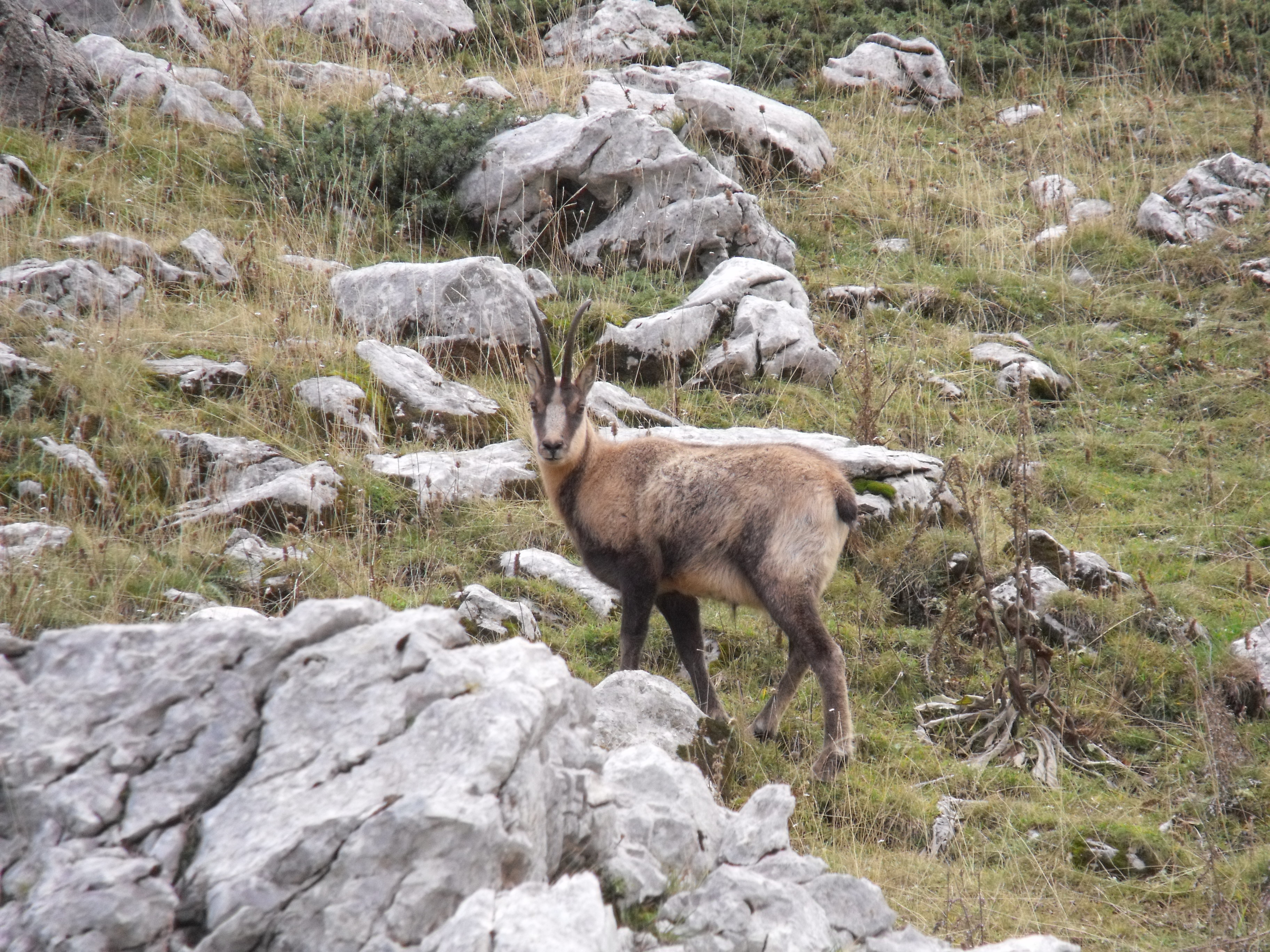
Pyrenean chamois

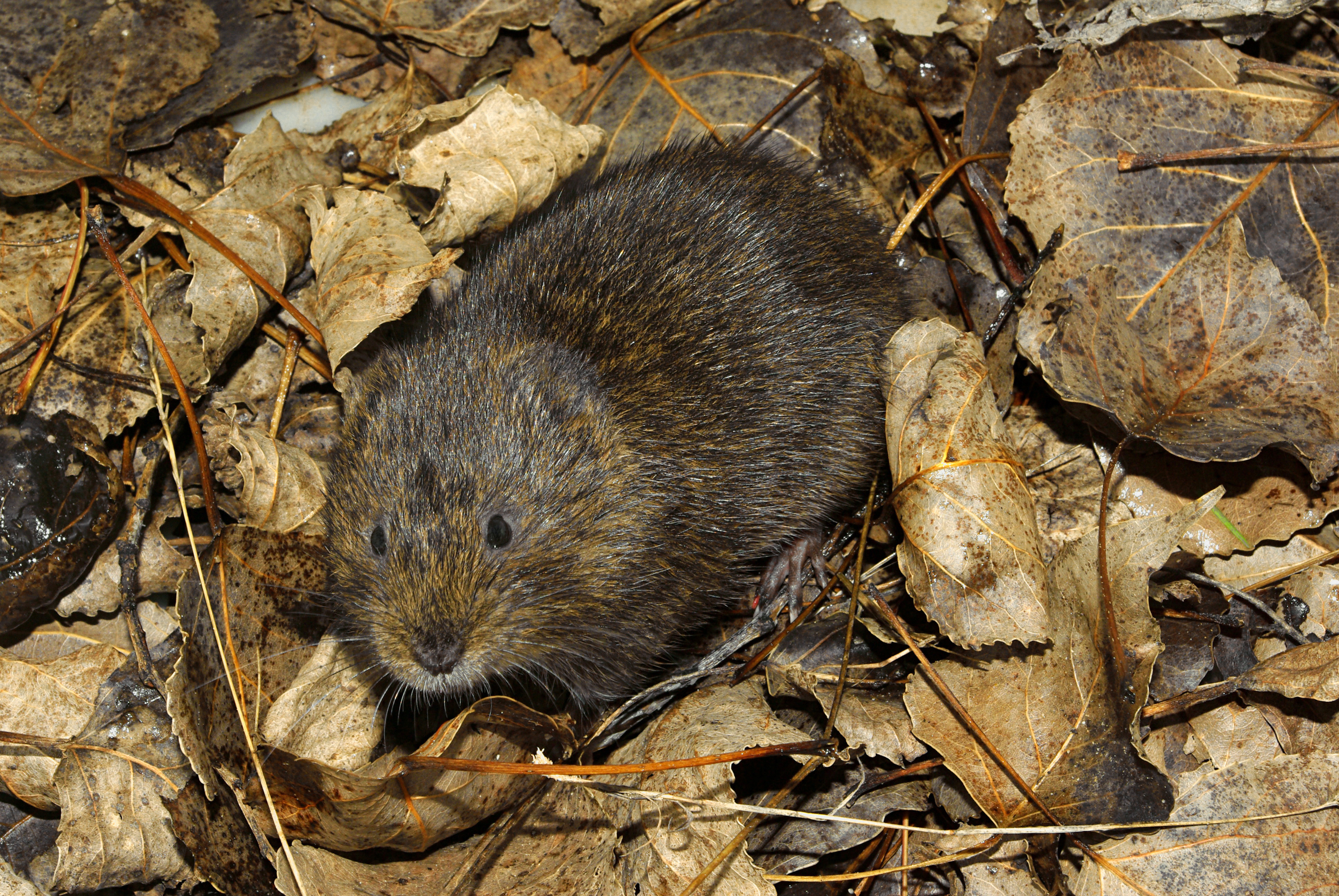
Southwestern water vole

Including the mainland and the island groups, Spain has an estimated 60 to 70,000 animal species. Of these, about seven hundred are vertebrates (excluding marine fish) and the remainder are invertebrates. The highest degree of endemism occurs among freshwater fish and in the mountainous areas, the coastal areas, and among the Canary Island fauna. About 30% of the vertebrates in Spain are threatened.

Terrestrial mammals native to Spain and the island groups, include the European hedgehog, two species of mole, the Pyrenean desman and about a dozen species of shrew. There are about thirty-five species of bat, as well as the European rabbit, the European hare and two other species of hare. Larger rodents include the Eurasian beaver, the red squirrel, the alpine marmot and the brown rat as well as about twenty-eight species of mice, voles and other small rodents. Of the ungulates, the wild boar, the fallow deer, the red deer, the roe deer, the Iberian ibex and the Pyrenean chamois are found in the country.

Terrestrial carnivores include the brown bear, the Iberian wolf and the Italian wolf, the red fox, the Iberian lynx, the Eurasian lynx and the common genet. Also present are the European badger, the Eurasian otter, the stoat, the least weasel, the European polecat, the stone marten and the European pine marten. The coast is visited by six species of seal, and the waters around the coast by thirty species of whale, dolphin and porpoise.

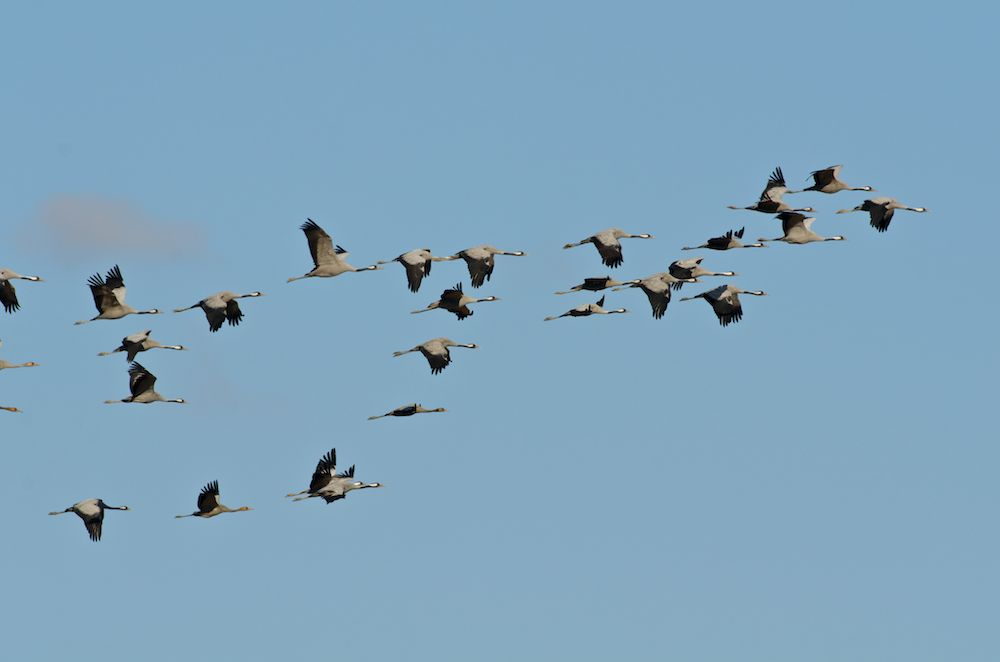
Common cranes flying over Castilla during their winter migration

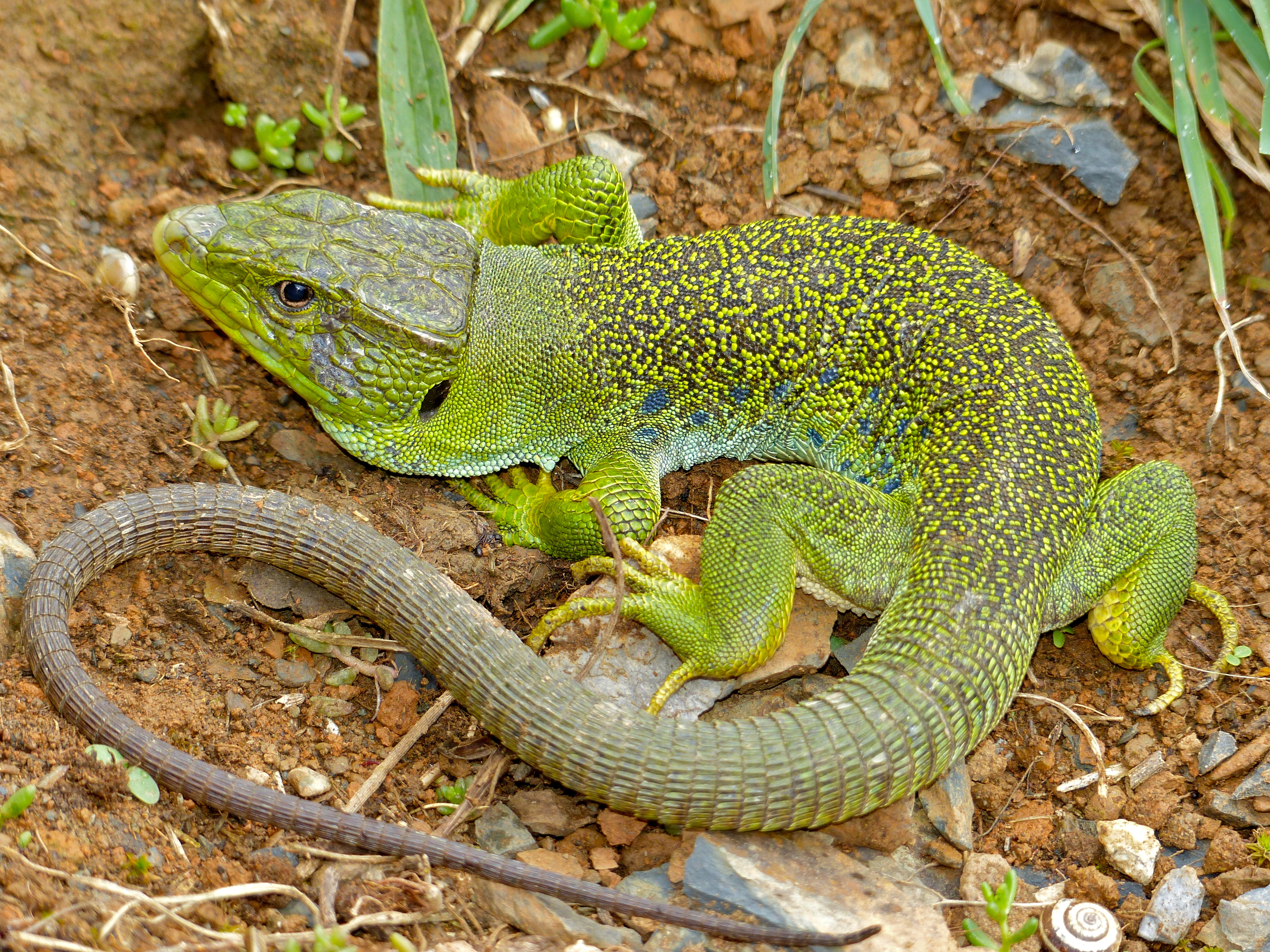
Ocellated lizard

With its varied habitats, Spain has a large number of bird species, 644 having been recorded, seven of which are endemic. The endemic species are restricted to the offshore islands and include Bolle's pigeon, laurel pigeon, Canary Islands oystercatcher (extinct), Canary Islands chiffchaff, Balearic warbler, Canary Islands stonechat and Tenerife blue chaffinch. Besides the large number of resident bird species, Spain is visited in spring and autumn by many migratory birds, travelling between their over-wintering grounds in Africa and their breeding grounds in northern Europe.

The upland plateaus provide habitat for Dupont's lark, horned lark, European roller and black wheatear, and the remaining sclerophyllous woodland provides overwintering for thousands of common crane and breeding areas for white storks and black storks, as well as black-winged kite, short-toed snake eagle, cinereous vulture and griffon vulture.

The rivers and lakes harbour various relict freshwater fish, including the endemic Spanish minnowcarp and Luciobarbus microcephalus, and among reptiles, the Caspian turtle and European pond turtle. Other reptiles include Hermann's tortoise, Greek tortoise and pond slider, as well as four species of sea turtle. Also recorded in Spain are the common chameleon and about sixty species of lizard, worm lizard, gecko and skink, many being endemic to the Canary Islands and Balearics, and some occurring in the Spanish enclaves in North Africa. Sixteen species of snake are similarly listed for Spain.
