= Carl Bolle (naturalist) =

German naturalist and collector (1821–1909)

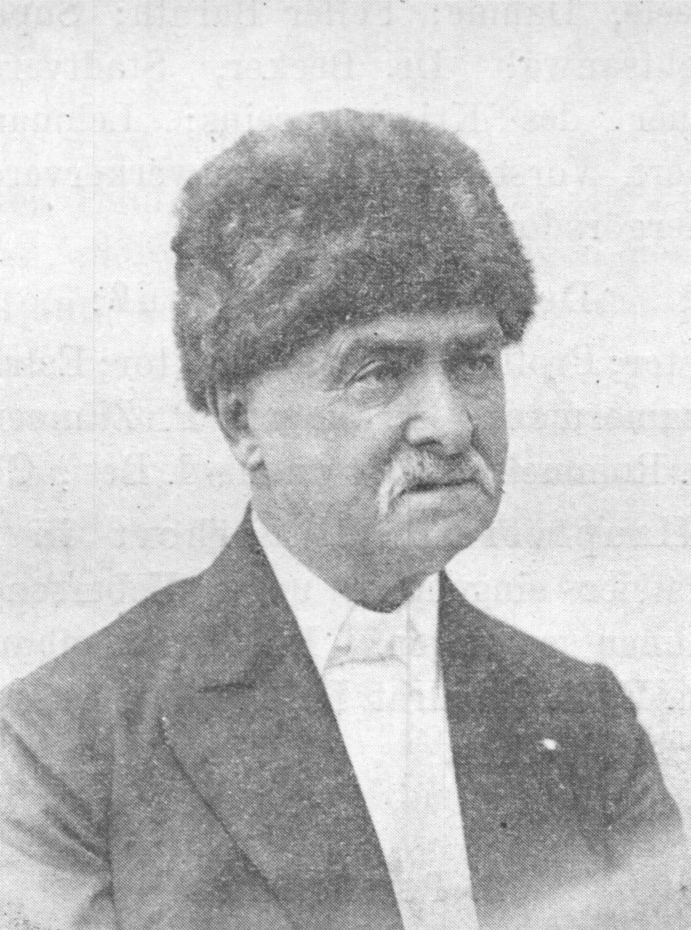
- Carl Bolle
- Born: 21 November 1821; Berlin, Germany
- Died: 17 February 1909 (aged 87); Germany
- Citizenship: Germany
- Scientific career
- Fields: Natural History

Carl August Bolle (sometimes also Karl Bolle) (21 November 1821, Schöneberg (Berlin) – 17 February 1909) was a German naturalist and collector.

Bolle was born at Berlin into a wealthy brewing family. He studied medicine and natural science at Berlin and Bonn. He visited the Cape Verde Islands and the Canary Islands in 1852 and 1856, and wrote Mein zweiter Beitrag zur Vogelkunde der Canarischen Inseln in 1857.

Bolle was a founder member of the Deutsche Ornithologen-Gesellschaft (German Ornithological Society) in 1867, succeeding Alfred Brehm as chairman in 1884.

The Bolle's laurel pigeon (Columba bollii) of the Canary Islands was named after him by Frederick DuCane Godman.

He also made contributions as a botanist, especially in the field of dendrology. His herbarium was bequeathed to the Berlin-Dahlem Botanical Garden and Botanical Museum, although largely destroyed during World War II (1943). The plant genus Bollea (family Orchidaceae) was named in his honor, but is now called Pescatoria.
