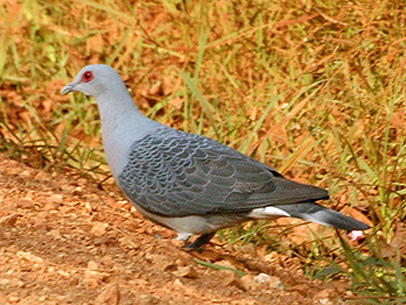
- Afep pigeon in Uganda

Conservation status
- Least Concern (IUCN 3.1)

Scientific classification
- Kingdom: Animalia
- Phylum: Chordata
- Class: Aves
- Order: Columbiformes
- Family: Columbidae
- Genus: Columba
- Species: C. unicincta

Binomial name
- Columba unicincta Cassin, 1860

= Afep pigeon =

Species of bird

The afep pigeon (Columba unicincta), also known as the African woodpigeon or grey woodpigeon, is a member of the family Columbidae, native to the African tropical rainforest from Sierra Leone east to Uganda.

== Taxonomy ==
The afep pigeon was described by the American ornithologist John Cassin in 1860 from a specimen collected in West Africa from the Ogooué River, Gabon. He coined the binomial name Columba unicincta. The specific epithet combines the Latin uni- "one-" and cinctus "banded". The English name "afep" is the word for a pigeon in the Bulu language of Cameroon. The species is monotypic.

Its genetic relationship to other species in the genus has not yet been tested; morphological traits suggest it belongs to the woodpigeon group comprising the common wood pigeon C. palumbus, Bolle's pigeon C. bollii, and Trocaz pigeon C. trocaz.

== Description ==
The afep pigeon is 35–36 cm (13.8–14.2 in) length and weighs between 356–490 g (12.6–17.3 oz). The sexes are similar. It has a pale grey hind neck, pinkish-grey body, and dark grey wings; the tail has a broad white bar and a blackish tip. The throat and belly are white. The eyes and orbital rings are red.

This pigeon has a loud call. It sounds like "doo doo doo" or "whu whu whu whu-WHU".

== Distribution ==
Afep pigeons are found in the African tropical rainforest, on either side of the Dahomey Gap. It is primarily a lowland species, but occurs locally up to 1,600 m altitude in Cameroon and Uganda.

== Behaviour ==
=== Diet ===
Afep pigeons mainly feed on fruit, berries, grain and seeds. It has also been known to eat termites.

=== Reproduction ===
They mainly breed in the second half of the dry season. The female lays a single white egg. The egg is incubated for between 14 and 18 days, and both parents help raise the chick, which is fed with crop milk after hatching. A few days later, it will start eating small pieces of solid food. The chick fledges 20 to 25 days after they hatch.

== Conservation ==
They are classified by the IUCN as of least concern. Their population is stable and unfragmented, though the exact number of birds is unknown. It is scarce to rare across much of its range, but locally common in the centre of its range in southern Cameroon, Gabon, and northwestern Angola.
