= Charles Heineken =

German medical doctor, ornithologist and entomologist

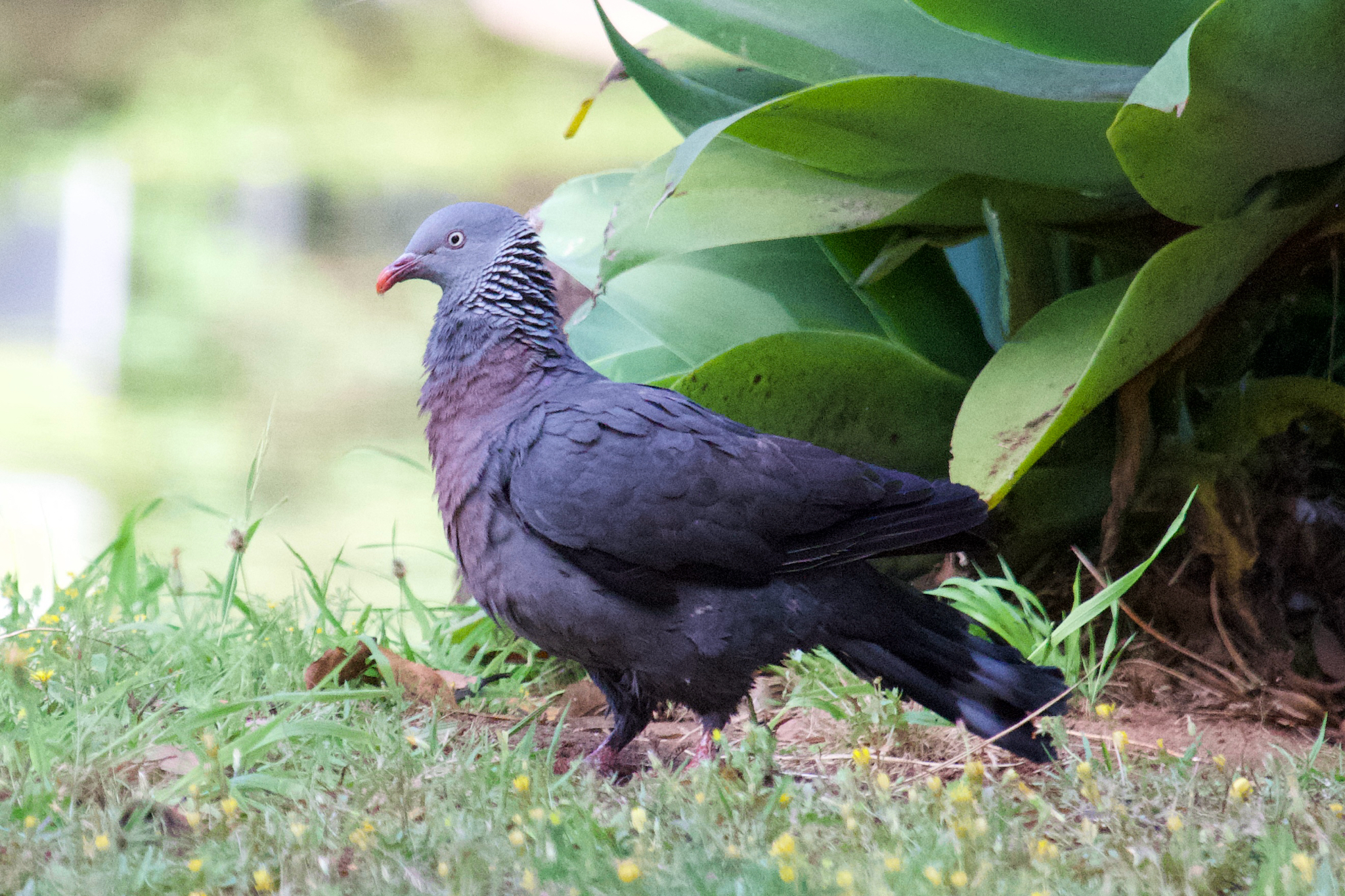
Trocaz pigeon (Columba trocaz), first described by Heineken

Charles Heineken (died 4 January 1830), also known as Carlos Heineken, was an English medical doctor and ornithologist. He lived on Madeira, a Portuguese island in Macaronesia, from 1826 until his death. He described the Trocaz pigeon, a Madeiran endemic bird species. He is commemorated in the scientific name of a subspecies of blackcap, Sylvia atricapilla heineken.
