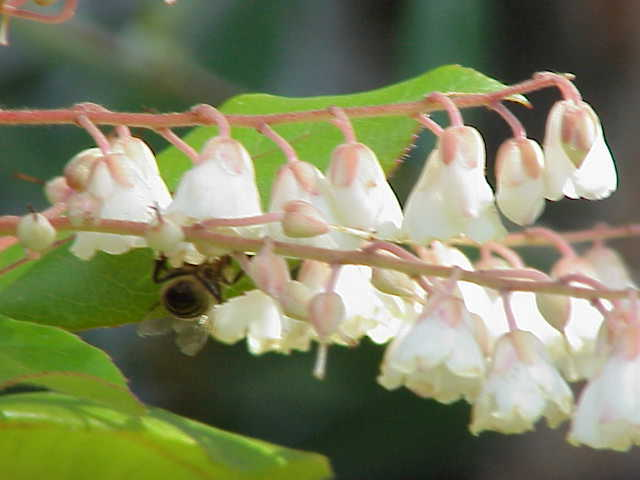
- Flowers

Scientific classification
- Kingdom: Plantae
- Clade: Tracheophytes
- Clade: Angiosperms
- Clade: Eudicots
- Clade: Asterids
- Order: Ericales
- Family: Clethraceae
- Genus: Clethra
- Species: C. arborea

Binomial name
- Clethra arborea Aiton

Synonyms
- Clethra arborea Vent. nom. illeg.; Clethra cordata Raf.; Clethra secundiflora Decne.

= Clethra arborea =

Species of plant

Clethra arborea, commonly known as the lily-of-the-valley-tree, is a flowering plant in the genus Clethra. It is found in Macaronesia where it is native to Madeira, extinct in the Canary Islands, and considered an introduced species in the Azores. In Madeira its natural habitat is laurisilva forest.

== Description ==
It is an evergreen narrowly upright shrub or small tree, growing to about 6 m tall and 4 m wide. The foliage is dense and glossy, with the leaves up to 7–10 cm long. The flowers are small, white and fragrant, similar in appearance to those of lily of the valley, hence the common name. (Lily of the valley is not closely related, being a monocotyledon.) The flowers are grouped in terminal panicles and bloom in early to mid summer. The plant is toxic to humans; it contains andromedotoxin which may cause diarrhea and even sudden death.

== Cultivation ==
The tree prefers moist, acidic and well-drained soils, disliking alkaline soils. It is sensitive to frost and likely to die if the temperature falls below −3 °C. It is propagated by seeds, cuttings and air-layering.

== Gallery ==
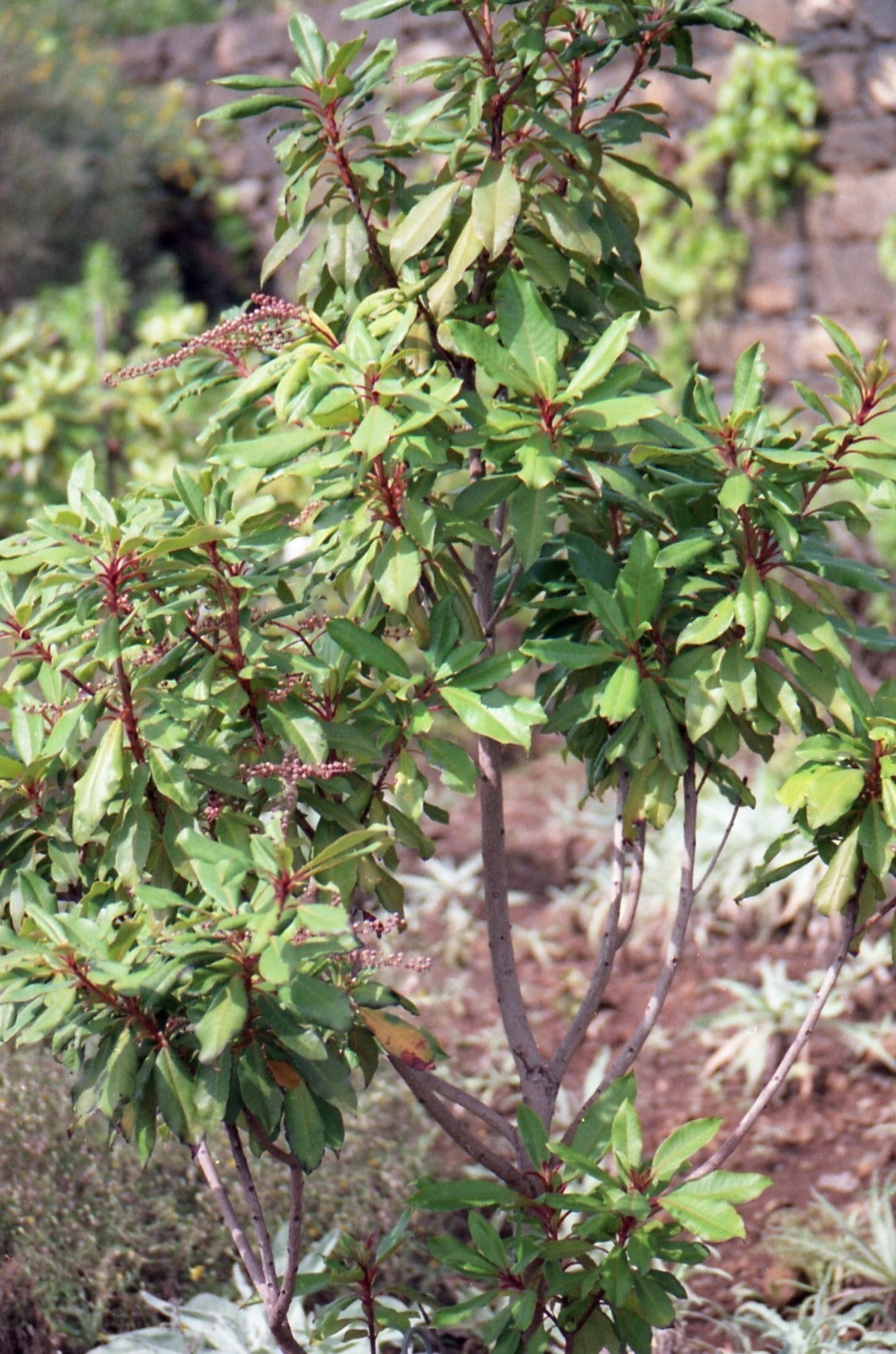
Madeira

Habit, Madeira

Habit, Madeira

Branch, Madeira

Foliage, Madeira
