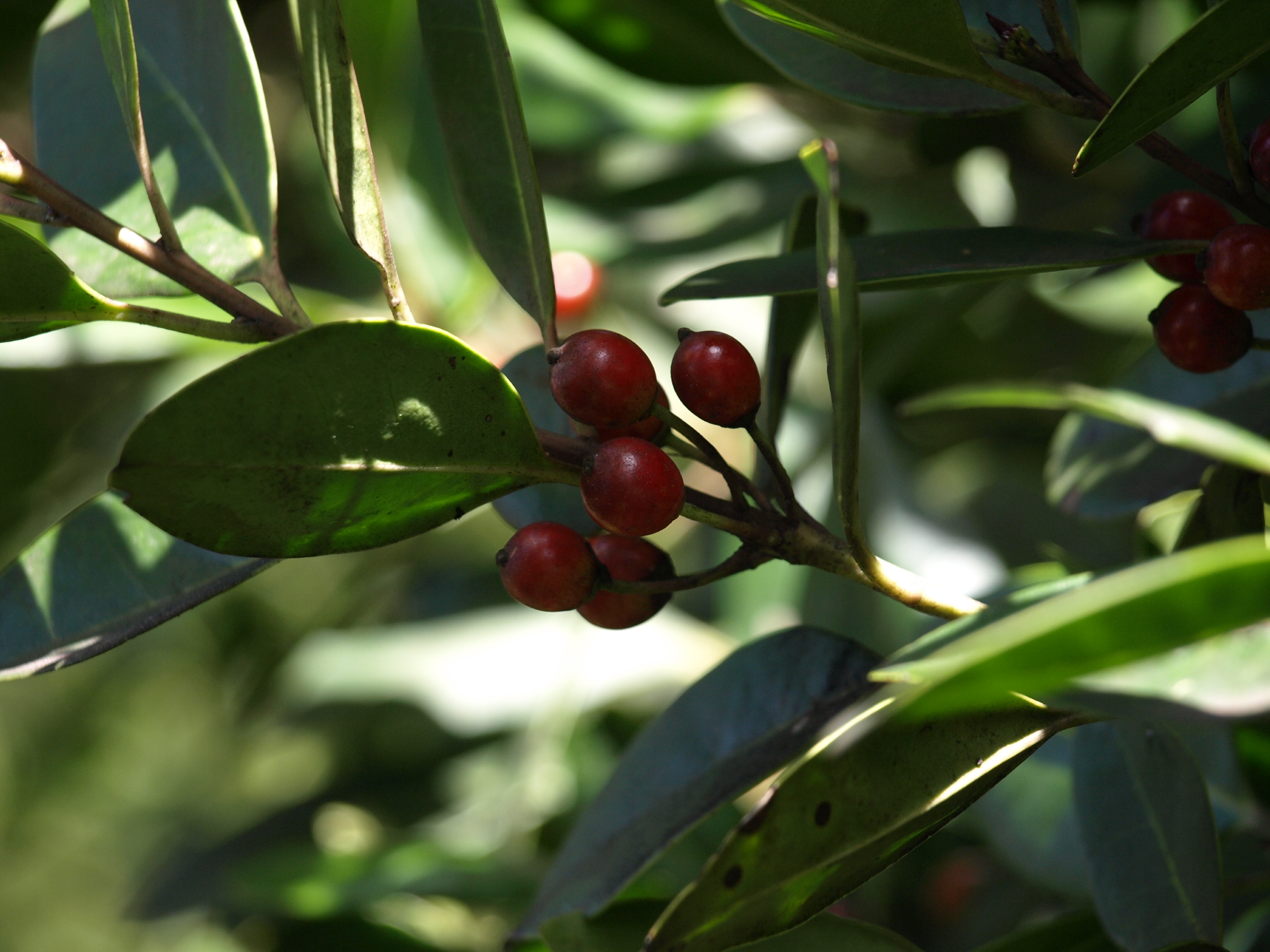

Conservation status
- Least Concern (IUCN 3.1)

Scientific classification
- Kingdom: Plantae
- Clade: Tracheophytes
- Clade: Angiosperms
- Clade: Eudicots
- Clade: Asterids
- Order: Aquifoliales
- Family: Aquifoliaceae
- Genus: Ilex
- Species: I. canariensis

Binomial name
- Ilex canariensis Poir.

= Ilex canariensis =

Species of holly

Ilex canariensis, the small-leaved holly, is an endemic species of holly native to Macaronesian islands. It is a species of plant in the family Aquifoliaceae. It is found in the Macaronesian islands of Madeira (Portugal) and Canary Islands (Spain).

== Description ==
This species is known as acebiño in Spanish and azevinho in Portuguese, which means generically "holly" elsewhere. It is a shrub or small tree up to 6.5 meters tall sometimes 10 m high, evergreen, with a gray trunk. It has glossy ovate leaves, 5–7 cm long by and 2.5–4 cm wide, usually whole rounded edges in the leaves and only a few small spines; iota obtuse or rounded. The leaves have ovate to ovate to lanceolate, bright and whole. The young leaves can be as thorny.

The flowers are small, clustered in axillary inflorescences. The flowers are having four to six white petals, the flowers are located in subterminal leaf axils. It blooms from May to June. The fruits are globular and red holly. Fruits spherical, about 1 cm wide, fleshy, red and located on stems of 3–8 mm long. There are two subspecies. In the ssp. azevinho (Sol. ex Lowe, Kunkel) the pedicels may reach 2 cm.

== Subspecies ==
Two subspecies are accepted.

- Ilex canariensis subsp. azevinho (Sol. ex Lowe) G.Kunkel (synonym Ilex azevinho Sol. ex Lowe) – Madeira
- Ilex canariensis subsp. canariensis (synonym Ilex perado Link)– Canary Islands

== Ecology ==
Ilex canariensis is a plant in the family Aquifoliaceae related to European holly, endemic to Madeira and the Canary Islands. It has two subspecies both of them having the trunk clear with white and brown spots. It reproduces by seeds and shoots. Ilex canariensis needs high humidity and relatively stable and mild temperature.

It is threatened by habitat loss. The species is found mainly at lower altitudes in scrub and laurisilva where moisture in the air condenses or at the bottom of the ravines or near wet areas. Laurisilva may be increasing in Madeira, but throughout much of the range there are pressures, particularly from sheep and goats grazing and fires. This endemism has lost almost all the spines present on the edge of the leaves of the European holly, certainly due to the lack of pressure from herbivores that did not exist in these islands until the introduction of cattle by humans.

The Laurel forest of Laurisilva is a subtropical forest, found in areas with high humidity and relatively stable and mild temperatures. The macaronesian laurissilva is an endemic ecoregion from Macaronesia with many endemic laurifolia trees of what Ilex canariensis is one of them, endemic to the island of Madeira and the Canary Islands.
