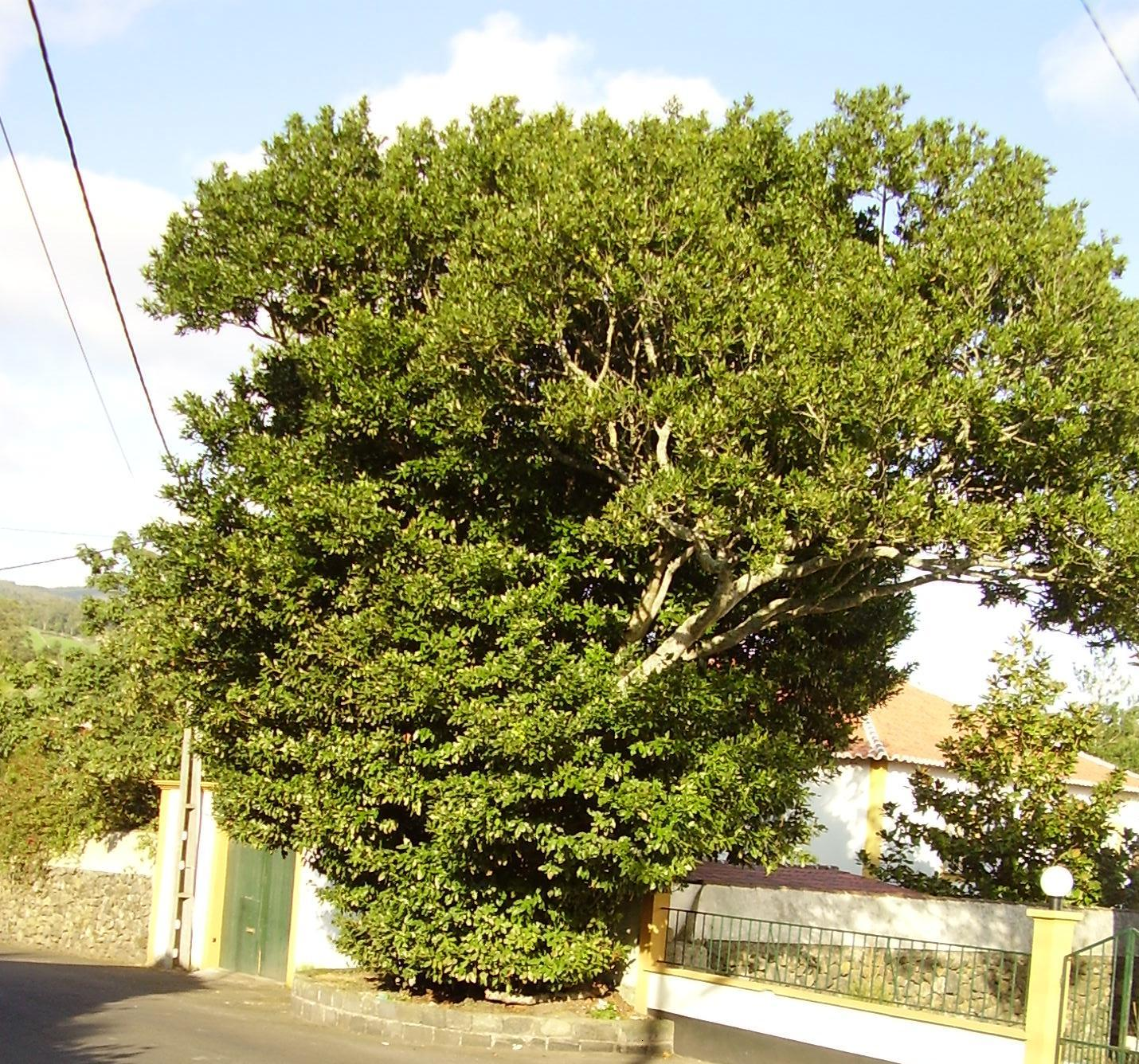

Conservation status
- Least Concern (IUCN 3.1)

Scientific classification
- Kingdom: Plantae
- Clade: Tracheophytes
- Clade: Angiosperms
- Clade: Magnoliids
- Order: Laurales
- Family: Lauraceae
- Genus: Ocotea
- Species: O. foetens

Binomial name
- Ocotea foetens (Aiton) Baill.

Synonyms
- Borbonia foetens (Aiton) J.Presl; Laurus foetens Aiton (1789) (basionym); Laurus maderensis Lam.; Mespilodaphne foetens (Aiton) Meisn.; Oreodaphne foetens (Aiton) Nees; Persea foetens (Aiton) Spreng.

= Ocotea foetens =

Species of tree

Ocotea foetens, commonly called til or stinkwood is a species of tree in the family Lauraceae. It is evergreen and grows up to 40 m tall. It is a common constituent of the laurisilva forests of Madeira and the Canary Islands. Leaf fossils of this species are known from the Mio-Pleistocene of Madeira Island.

The species was first described as Laurus foetens by William Aiton in 1789. In 1870 Henri Ernest Baillon placed the species in genus Ocotea as O. foetens.

== Description ==
Ocotea foetens is endemic to Macaronesia. Like the other species of the genus Ocotea, it is rich in essential oils, which give an unpleasant odor to the wood when freshly cut (hence the name foetens, Latin for smelly, stinky, disgusting, or unpleasant). It is rarely used as an ornamental. It is an evergreen tree, generally up to 30 m (33 yd) in height, although some specimens may reach 40 m (44 yd). It commonly grows with multiple trunks branched from the base. The bark is rough and irregular, and dark in colour; the young branches are angular, with smooth bark, sometimes reddish in areas of recent growth. The wood is dark and hard.

The leaves are about 9–12 cm (3.5–4.7 in) long and 3–5 cm (1.2–2.0 in) wide, oblong-lanceolate to almost elliptical, acuminate at the apex and slightly indented at the base. In adult plants, the leaves are leathery in texture, glossy on both sides, darker green on the upper surface, with 2(-4) small gland-like depressions on the underside near the base. The petioles are short (up to 15 mm (0.59 in) in length).

The flowers of both sexes are white, with splashes of green and pale yellow, releasing a slight odor. The perianth has six components, and there are nine stamens. The predominant flowering season is from June to August (northern hemisphere).

The fruit is a berry, hard and fleshy and about 3 cm (1.2 in) long, its lower half covered by a dome, giving it a look similar to an acorn. The fruit is dark green, gradually darkening with maturity. The fruit has a single seed wrapped in a hard coat. When the fruits fall, they separate from the dome. Germination is favored by moisture and light.

== Ecology ==
Ocotea foetens is endemic to Madeira and the Canary Islands, appearing in laurel forest habitat, generally between 400 and 1400 m altitude. In the Canary Islands it is not present on Lanzarote or Fuerteventura. In the archipelago of Madeira it is absent from Porto Santo. In the Azores Islands it is an introduced species. It is the only Paleoendemic Ocotea species in the wetter relict forest areas of Macaronesia. Its berries are consumed mostly by the endemic Madeiran pigeon Columba trocaz.

== Folklore ==
Ocotea foetens was sacred to the Bimbaches, the older inhabitants of El Hierro in the Canary Islands, and was one of their symbols. The legend states that the "Garoé" was a large laurel tree that assured the life of the Bimbaches, providing them with water in sufficient amounts for their survival. The islands are located where tradewinds occur, and water from clouds condensed on the branches of the tree and it later poured rain around the tree. One of many legends says that the water originating from the tree was led to a hole from which the Bimbaches could provide water.

The original tree fell in a storm in 1610. In 1957, a replacement was planted in the same location as the Garoé. It has been growing and is surrounded by mosses.

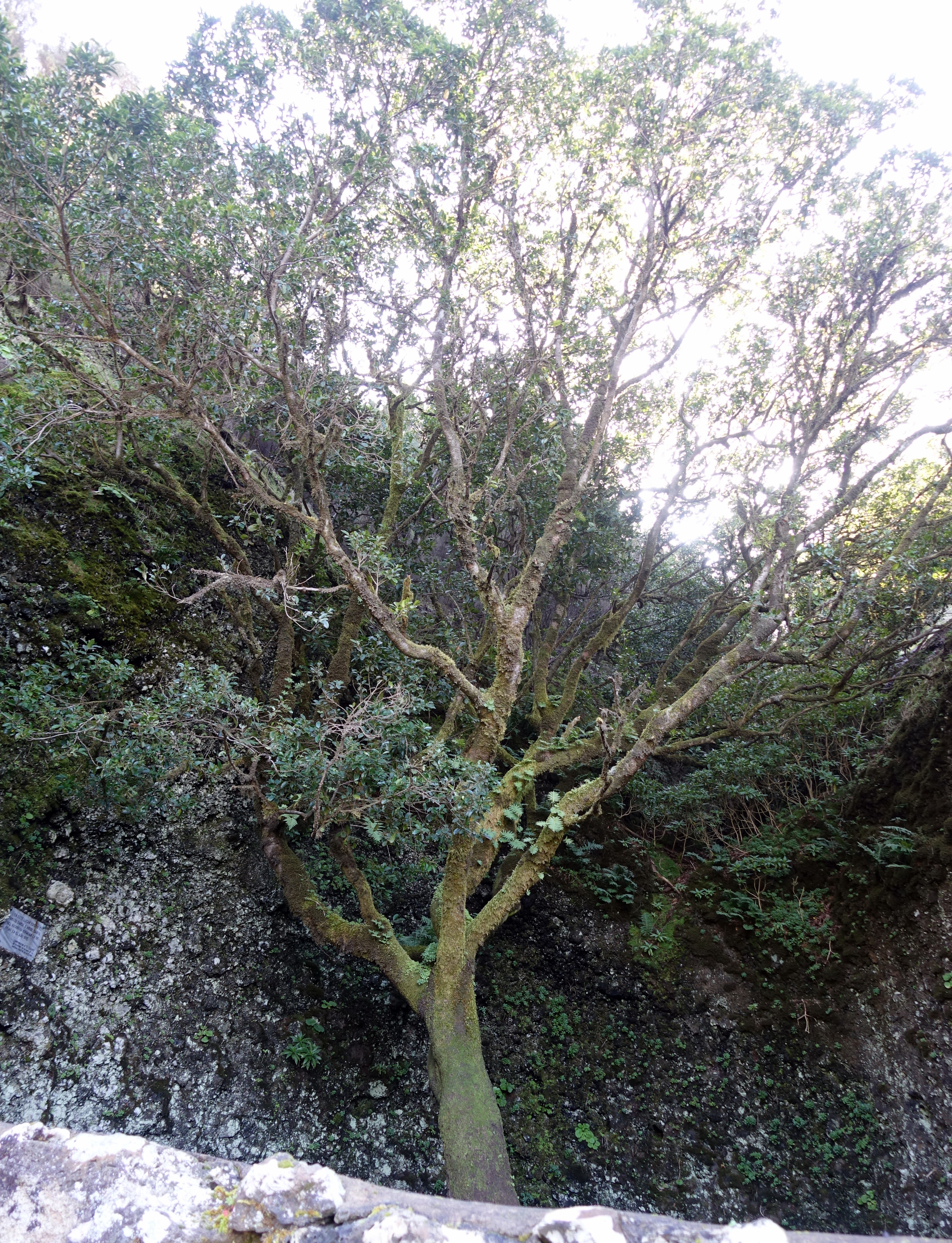
Ocotea foetens El Hierro

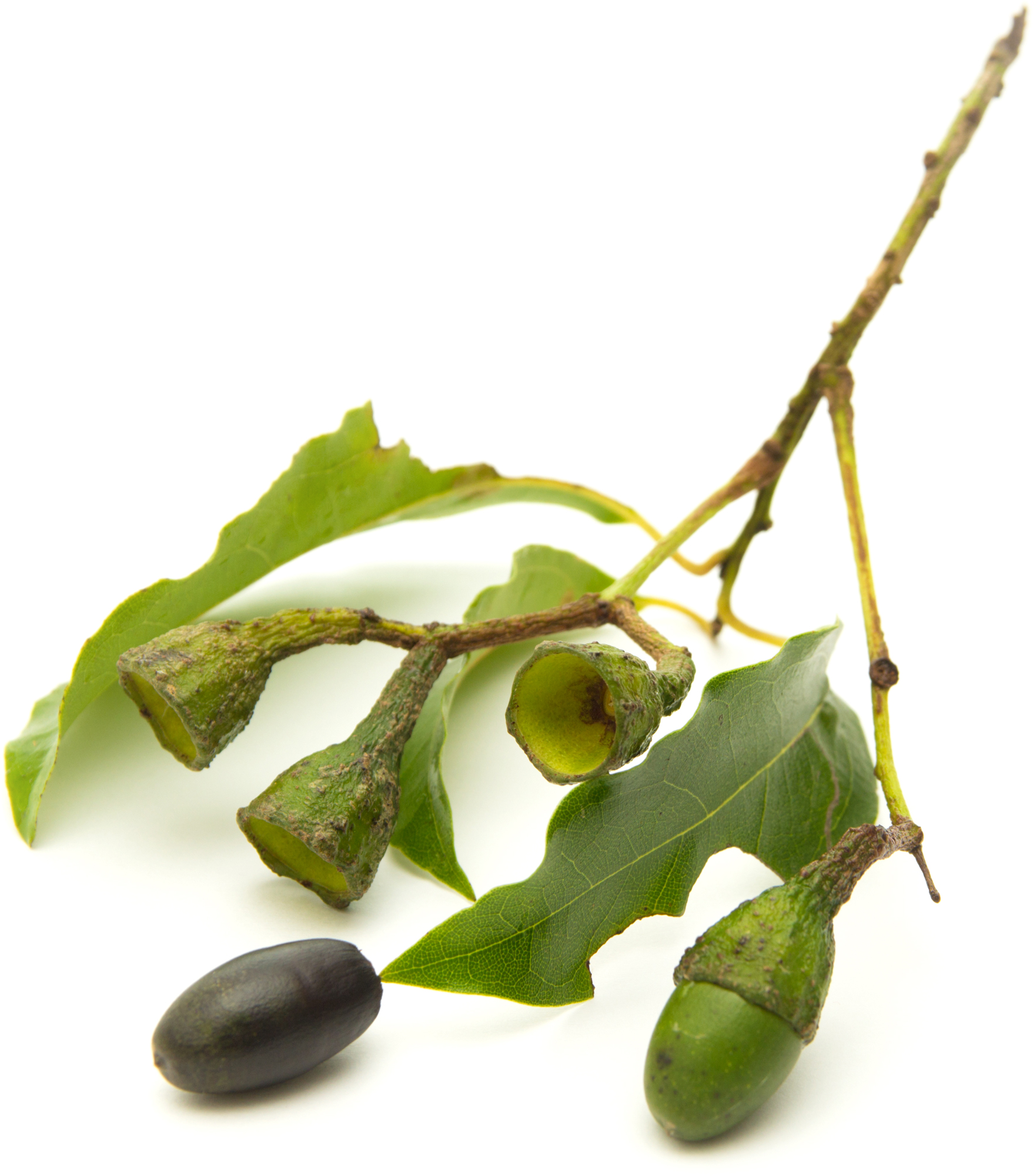
Small branch of Ocotea foetens (tilo, stinkwood)
