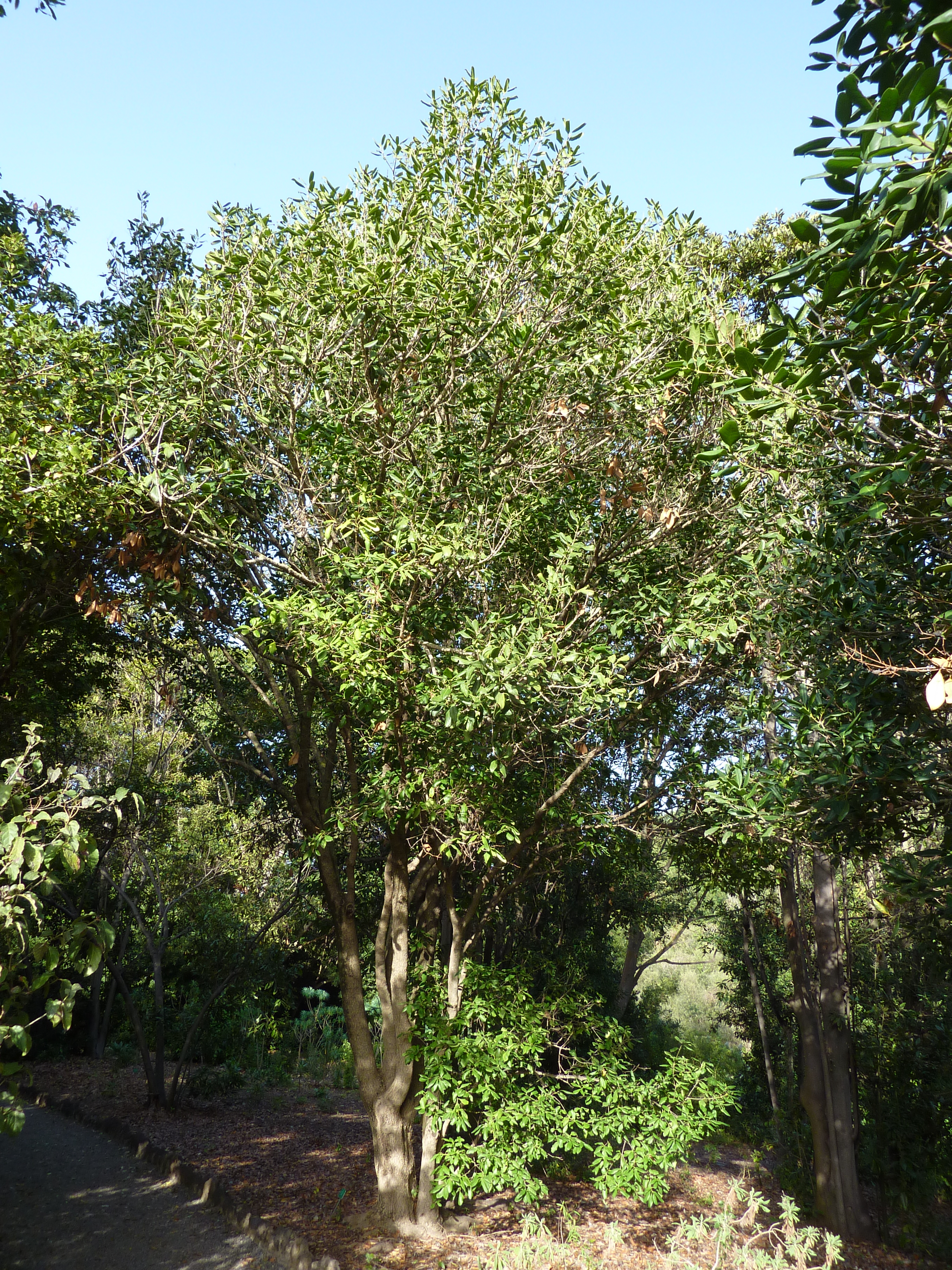
- P. excelsa photographed at the Jardín Botánico Canario Viera y Clavijo

Conservation status
- Least Concern (IUCN 3.1)

Scientific classification
- Kingdom: Plantae
- Clade: Tracheophytes
- Clade: Angiosperms
- Clade: Eudicots
- Clade: Asterids
- Order: Lamiales
- Family: Oleaceae
- Genus: Picconia
- Species: P. excelsa

Binomial name
- Picconia excelsa (Aiton) DC.

Synonyms
- Olea excelsa Aiton; Olea maderiensis Steud.; Notelaea excelsa (Aiton) Webb & Berthel.

= Picconia excelsa =

Species of tree

Picconia excelsa, commonly known as palo blanco, pau blanco, or branqueiro, is a species of tree in the family Oleaceae. It is endemic to Macaronesia, occurring only on Madeira and the Canary Islands.

== Distribution and habitat ==
Picconia excelsa can be found on the island of Madeira in the Madeira archipelago and on the islands of El Hierro, Fuerteventura, Gran Canaria, La Gomera, La Palma, and Tenerife in the Canary Islands. It primarily occurs in laurel forests at altitudes of 200–1,200 m (660–3,940 ft) above sea level, though it can also be found growing in pine forests and heathland dominated by Myrica and Erica species. It is typically found in open areas on slopes or in valleys.

== Description ==
Picconia excelsa is an evergreen shrub or small tree growing 10–15 m (33–49 ft) tall with a somewhat open crown. The roughly textured bark is white or grey in colour. The leathery leaves are elliptic to obovate in shape and arranged opposite one another, each measuring 6–8 cm (2.4–3.1 in) long. The leaves are dark green above and paler below, hairless, with entire margins. The racemose inflorescence bears hermaphroditic flowers. The flowers are white in colour, sometimes sweet-scented, with four petals. The fruit is a fleshy drupe with a single seed, similar to an olive, and measures approximately 2 cm (0.79 in) long. The fruit is initially green, becoming purplish black as it ripens.

== Ecology ==
Picconia excelsa is an important component of the laurel forests of Madeira and the Canary Islands. It is known to be a host for the epiphytic liverwort Frullania polysticta, a laurel forest habitat specialist also endemic to Macaronesia.

== Conservation status ==
Previously assessed as vulnerable in 1998, Picconia excelsa is listed as least concern on the International Union for the Conservation of Nature's Red List as of 2017 on account of its prevalence throughout its range, its apparently stable population, and the absence of major threats. Current threats include invasive species and the exploitation of forest resources. This species is present in several protected areas, including Garajonay National Park and Madeira Natural Park, and is conserved ex situ in at least 25 collections, including a seed bank.

== Uses ==
The wood of Picconia excelsa is used locally for carpentry and construction purposes. It is sometimes planted as part of reforestation efforts and as an ornamental tree. It was introduced to the United Kingdom as an ornamental species in 1784.
