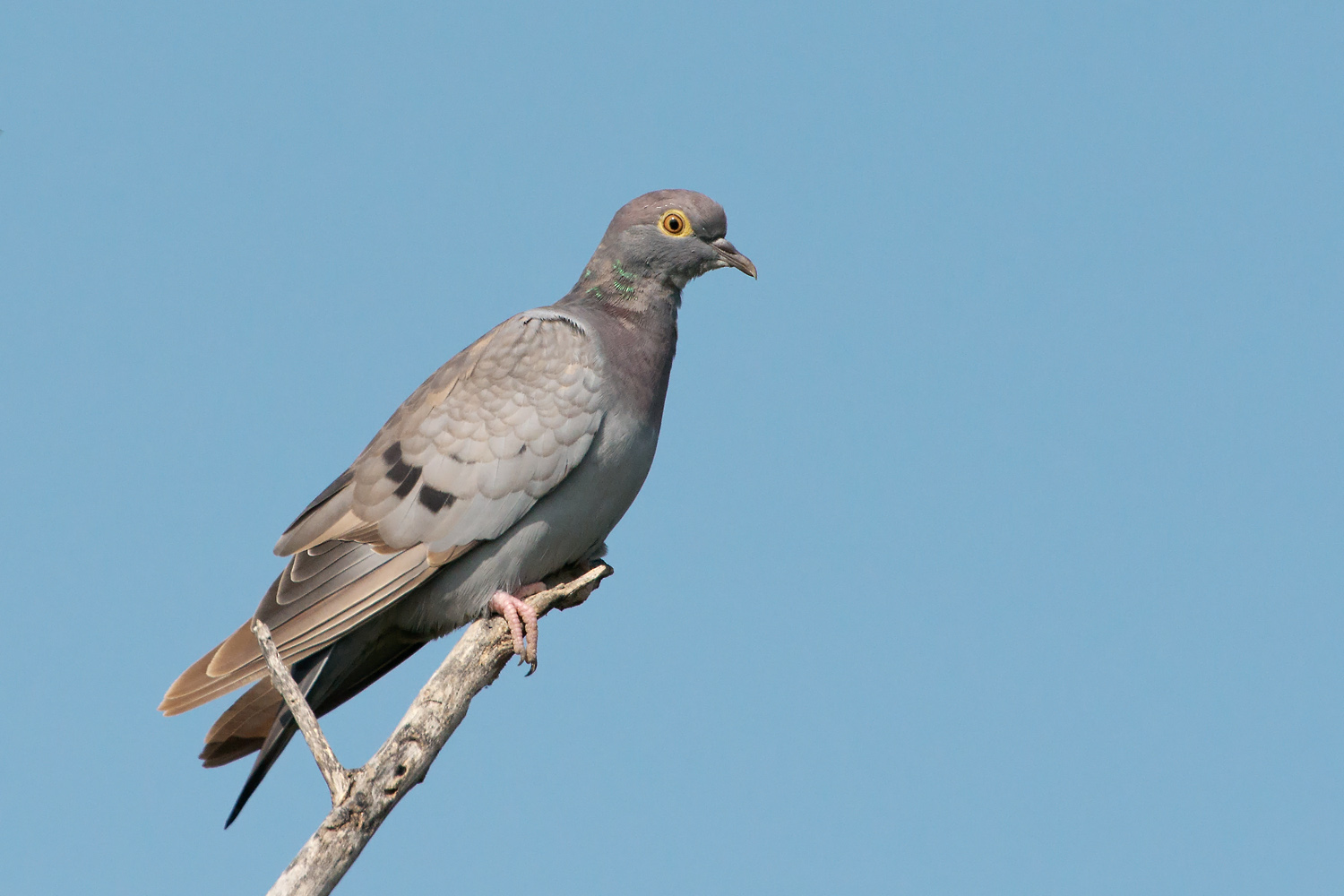
- Columba eversmanni from Tal Chapar Wildlife Sanctuary, Rajasthan, India

Conservation status
- Vulnerable (IUCN 3.1)

Scientific classification
- Kingdom: Animalia
- Phylum: Chordata
- Class: Aves
- Order: Columbiformes
- Family: Columbidae
- Genus: Columba
- Species: C. eversmanni

Binomial name
- Columba eversmanni Bonaparte, 1856

= Yellow-eyed pigeon =

Species of bird

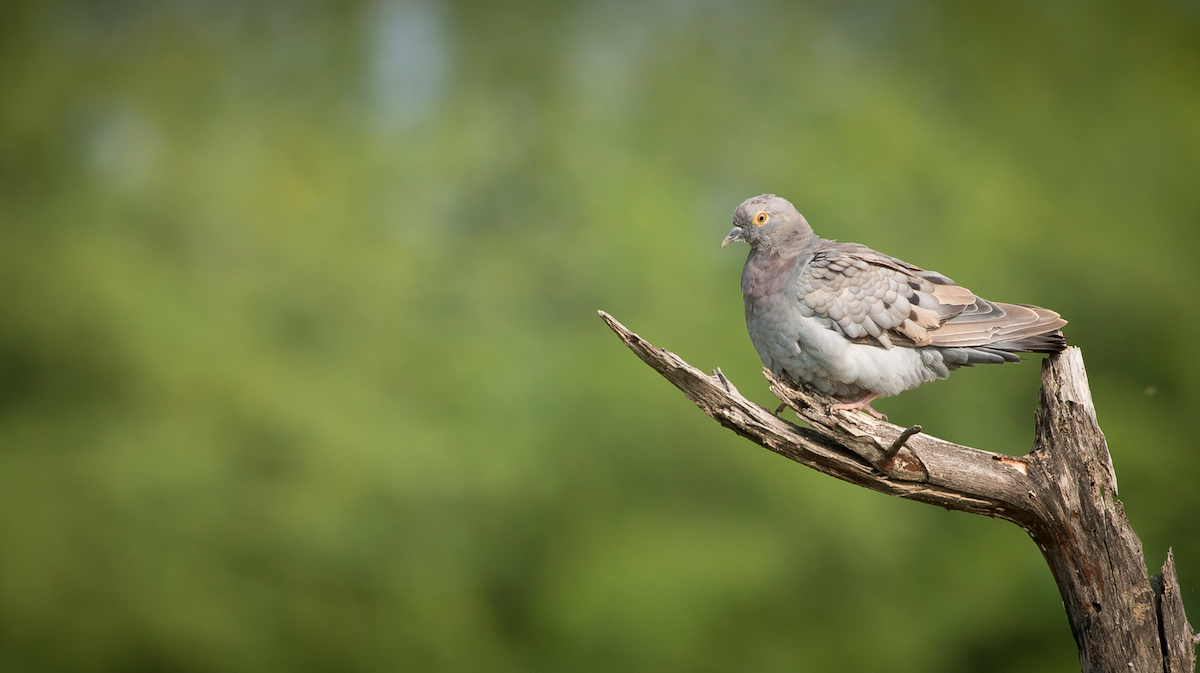
Individual from Tal Chappar Wildlife Sanctuary, Rajasthan, India

The yellow-eyed pigeon, pale-backed pigeon, yellow-eyed dove or yellow-eyed stock dove (Columba eversmanni) is a member of the family Columbidae (doves and pigeons). It breeds in southern Kazakhstan, Uzbekistan, Turkmenistan, Tajikistan, Kyrgyzstan, Afghanistan, north-east Iran and extreme north-west China. It winters in north-east Pakistan, Jammu and Kashmir and parts of Rajasthan (including Tal Chhapar Sanctuary and Jorbeer, Bikaner). The bird has declined in numbers over the years, chiefly because of hunting, and it is listed as "vulnerable" by the International Union for Conservation of Nature.

The bird was first described by the French ornithologist Charles Lucien Bonaparte in 1856. The binomial commemorates the German biologist and explorer Eduard Friedrich Eversmann who did much research into the flora and fauna of the southeast steppes of Russia.

== Description ==
The yellow-eyed pigeon is a medium-sized pigeon growing to a length of about 30 cm (12 in) and a weight of 183 to 234 g (6.5 to 8.3 oz). It is mostly grey, with a slightly brownish tinge to the upper parts and a pinkish-purple sheen on the crown, throat and breast. The wing has a black bar and the tail has a diffuse dark band. The lower back, rump and underside of the wings are white or pale grey. There is bare area of yellowish skin around the eye, the iris is yellow, the beak is yellowish and the feet pink. This pigeon could be confused with the rock dove (C. livia), but that species has more prominent wing bars and tail band. The hill pigeon (C. rupestris) is also similar, but it has a white subterminal band on the tail above the black terminal band. The yellow-eyed pigeon is generally a silent bird, but during the breeding season it sometimes emits a faint "oo-oo-oo".

== Distribution and habitat ==
The yellow-eyed pigeon breeds in southern Kazakhstan, Uzbekistan, Turkmenistan, Tajikistan, Kyrgyzstan, Afghanistan, north-east Iran and the extreme north-west part of China. It migrates southwards in the autumn to overwinter in Pakistan, north-western India and northwestern China, in the provinces of Xinjiang and Gansu. In its breeding area it inhabits steppes and other lowland habitats including semi-arid and arid areas. In its winter quarters it is found in agricultural areas, orchards and open countryside with scattered trees. It is particularly attracted to areas with mulberry trees.

== Ecology ==
The yellow-eyed pigeon feeds largely on seeds, grains and berries, usually foraging on the ground but sometimes plucking fruits from the bough. It migrates southwards in October and November, forming flocks in winter and roosting in trees. At one time flocks were numbered in thousands of individuals, but the numbers of birds have dwindled and flocks now often contain a few dozen birds, and seldom exceed a few hundred. It returns to its breeding range in April and nesting takes place during the late spring and summer. The nest site is in a hole in a cliff, a hollow tree or a ruined building. Two white eggs are laid on a platform of sticks.

== Status ==
At one time abundant, the population of the yellow-eyed pigeon has declined considerably over the years. The chief threat this bird faces is hunting, in both its breeding range and its winter quarters; the present population trend is unknown but the decline may be continuing and the International Union for Conservation of Nature has assessed the bird's conservation status as being "vulnerable".
