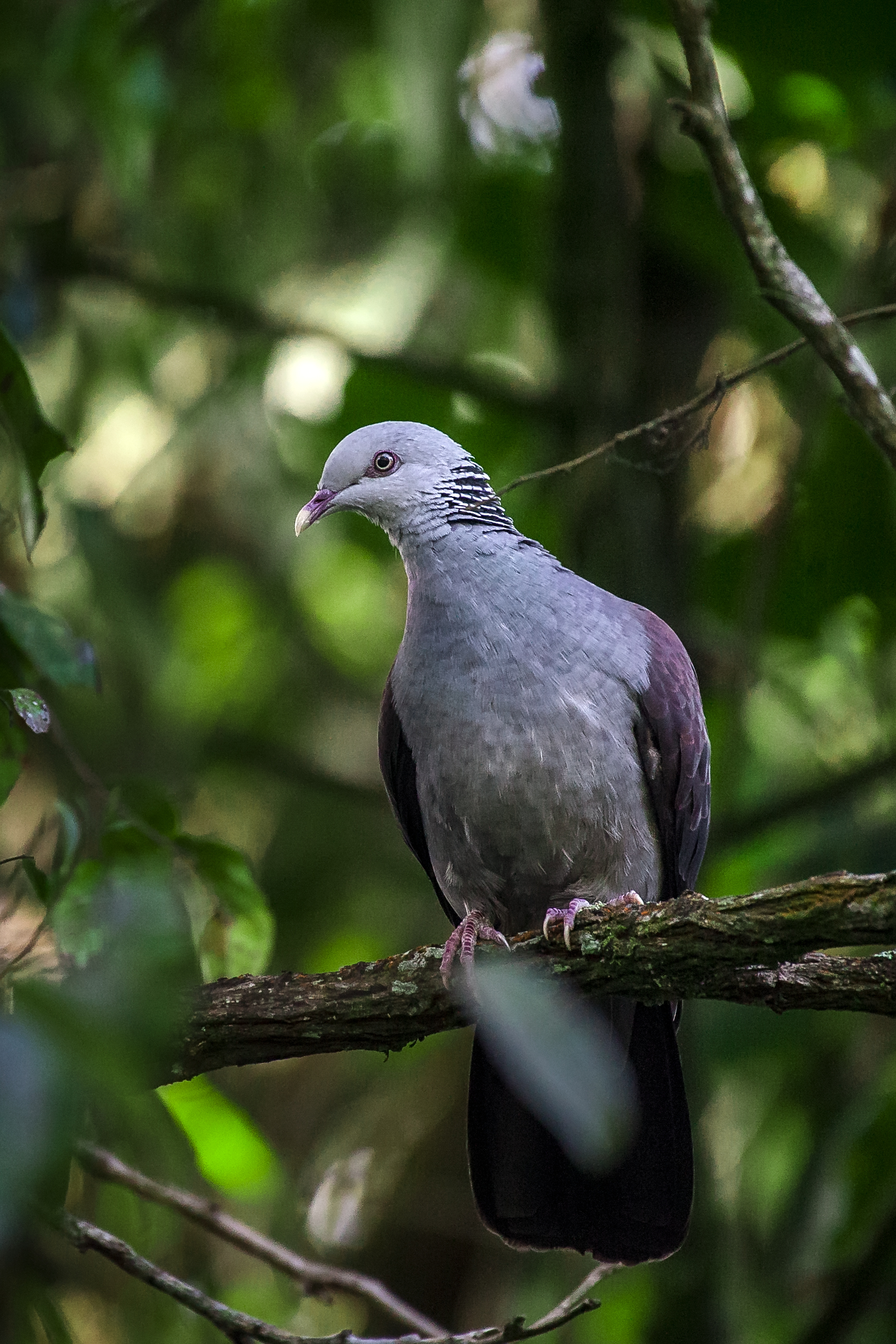
- Nilgiri wood pigeon Columba elphinstonii

Conservation status
- Least Concern (IUCN 3.1)

Scientific classification
- Kingdom: Animalia
- Phylum: Chordata
- Class: Aves
- Order: Columbiformes
- Family: Columbidae
- Genus: Columba
- Species: C. elphinstonii

Binomial name
- Columba elphinstonii (Sykes, 1832)
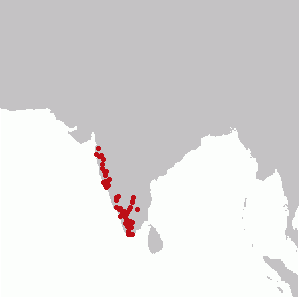
- ● range records

Synonyms
- Alsocomus elphinstonii Ptilinopus elphinstonii

= Nilgiri wood pigeon =

Species of bird

The Nilgiri wood pigeon (Columba elphinstonii) is a large pigeon found in the moist deciduous forests and sholas of the Western Ghats in southwestern India. They are mainly frugivorous and forage in the canopy of dense hill forests. They are best identified in the field by their large size, dark colours and the distinctive checkerboard pattern on their nape.

== Description ==
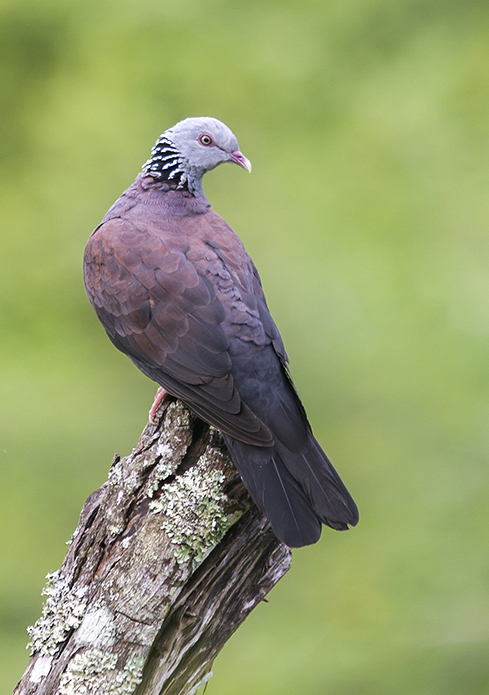
Nilgiri wood pigeon photographed at Munnar, Kerala

This pigeon appears dark grey and a black and white patterned patch made of white tipped stiff feathers on the back of the neck is distinctive. The mantle is chestnut. The male has a paler grey crown while the female has a darker grey crown with a pale throat. The most confusable other species is the mountain imperial pigeon but that species has paler underwing coverts. The feet and the base of the bill are red.

The species is evolutionarily close to the Ceylon woodpigeon Columba torringtoni and the ashy wood pigeon Columba pulchricollis which form a clade that is basal within the Old World genus Columba. The binomial commemorates Mountstuart Elphinstone (1779–1859).

== Distribution ==
The species is mainly found along the Western Ghats and in the Nilgiri Hills. Although found mainly in the hills, it is sometimes seen at lower elevations within the Western Ghats. A few relict populations survive on the high elevations hills of the peninsula such as the Biligirirangan Hills and Nandi Hills near Bangalore.

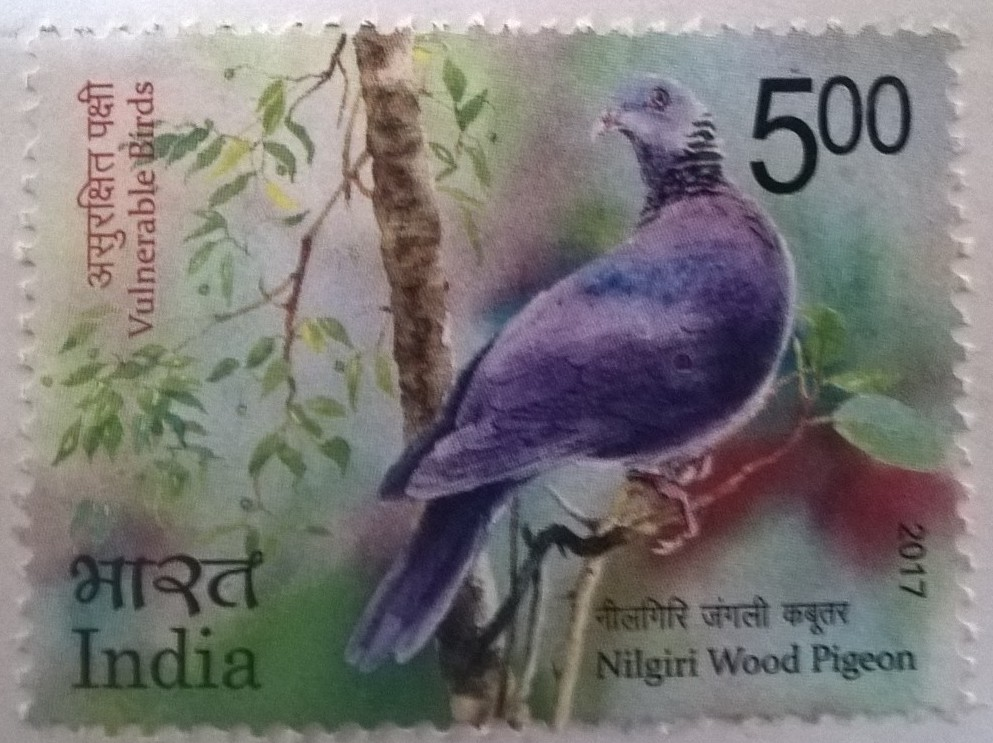
Postage stamp in India depicting the Nilgiri Wood Pigeon.

== Behaviour and ecology ==
Nilgiri wood pigeons are usually seen singly, in pairs or in small groups, feeding almost entirely in the trees but sometimes descending to the ground to forage on fallen fruits. Although feeding mainly on fruits they have been recorded taking small snails and other invertebrates. The breeding season is March to July during which time they make a flimsy platform of twigs and lay a single white egg which is usually visible from below the nest. They feed on large fruit and may play an important role in dispersal of the seeds of many forest trees. Fruit of the family Lauraceae are particularly favoured and most of their food is gathered by gleaning on the outer twigs of the middle and upper canopy. They have been recorded ingesting soil that may provide mineral nutrients or aid digestion. They often make movements within the forest according to the fruiting seasons of their favourite trees. Their call is a loud langur-like low-frequency hooting "who" followed by a series of deep "who-who-who" notes.
