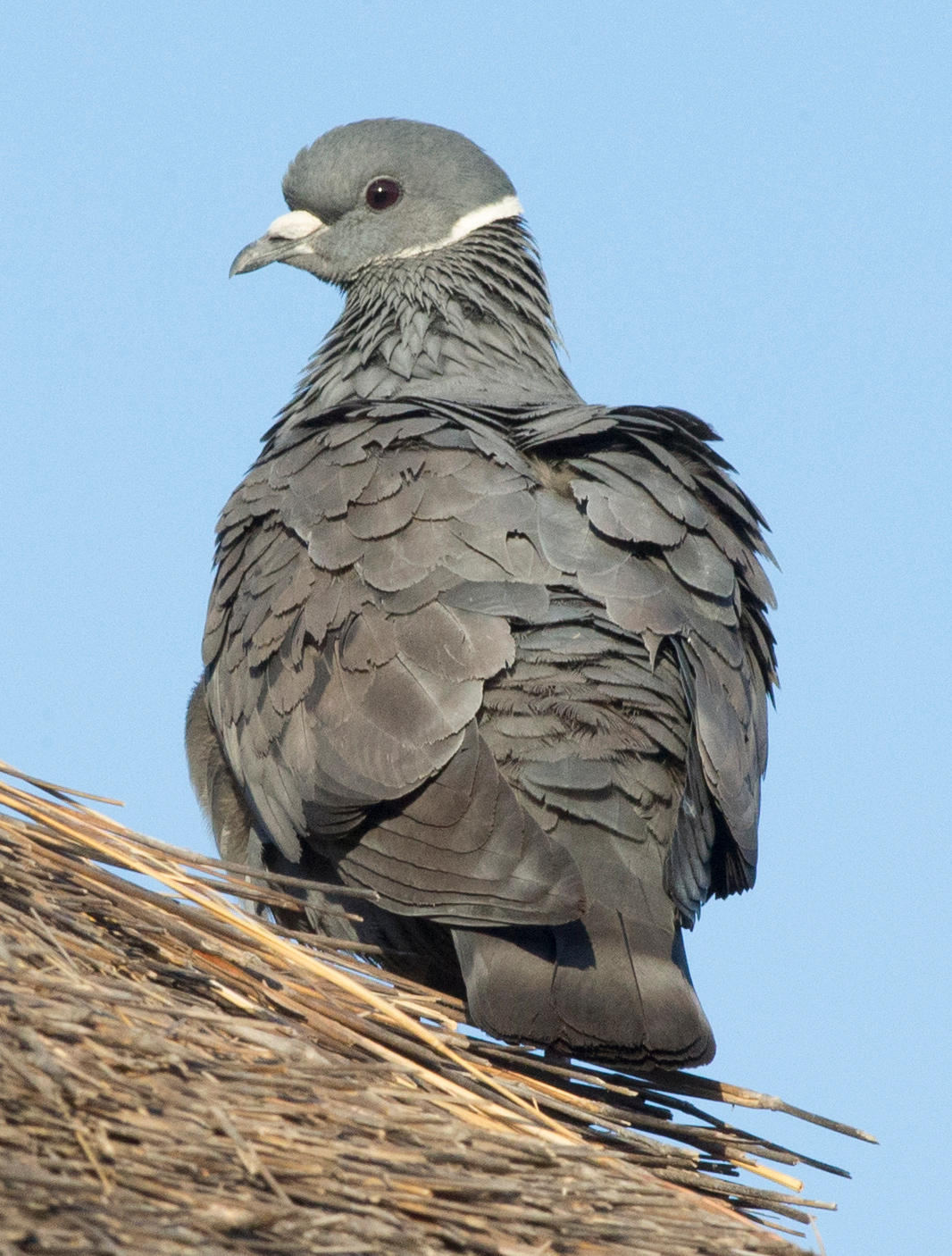
- In Ethiopia

Conservation status
- Least Concern (IUCN 3.1)

Scientific classification
- Kingdom: Animalia
- Phylum: Chordata
- Class: Aves
- Order: Columbiformes
- Family: Columbidae
- Genus: Columba
- Species: C. albitorques

Binomial name
- Columba albitorques Rüppell, 1837

= White-collared pigeon =

Species of bird

The white-collared pigeon (Columba albitorques) is a species of bird in the family Columbidae.

The species is endemic to the Ethiopian Highlands in Eritrea and Ethiopia. It occupies countryside surrounding rocky cliffs and gorgesand is also common in town centres.

The species is monotypic: no subspecies are recognised.

== Description ==
The white-collared pigeon is 32 cm (13 in) in length. It is a large grey-brown pigeon with a conspicuous white hindcollar contrasting with a slate-grey head. In flight it shows prominent white wing patches formed by white inner primary coverts.
