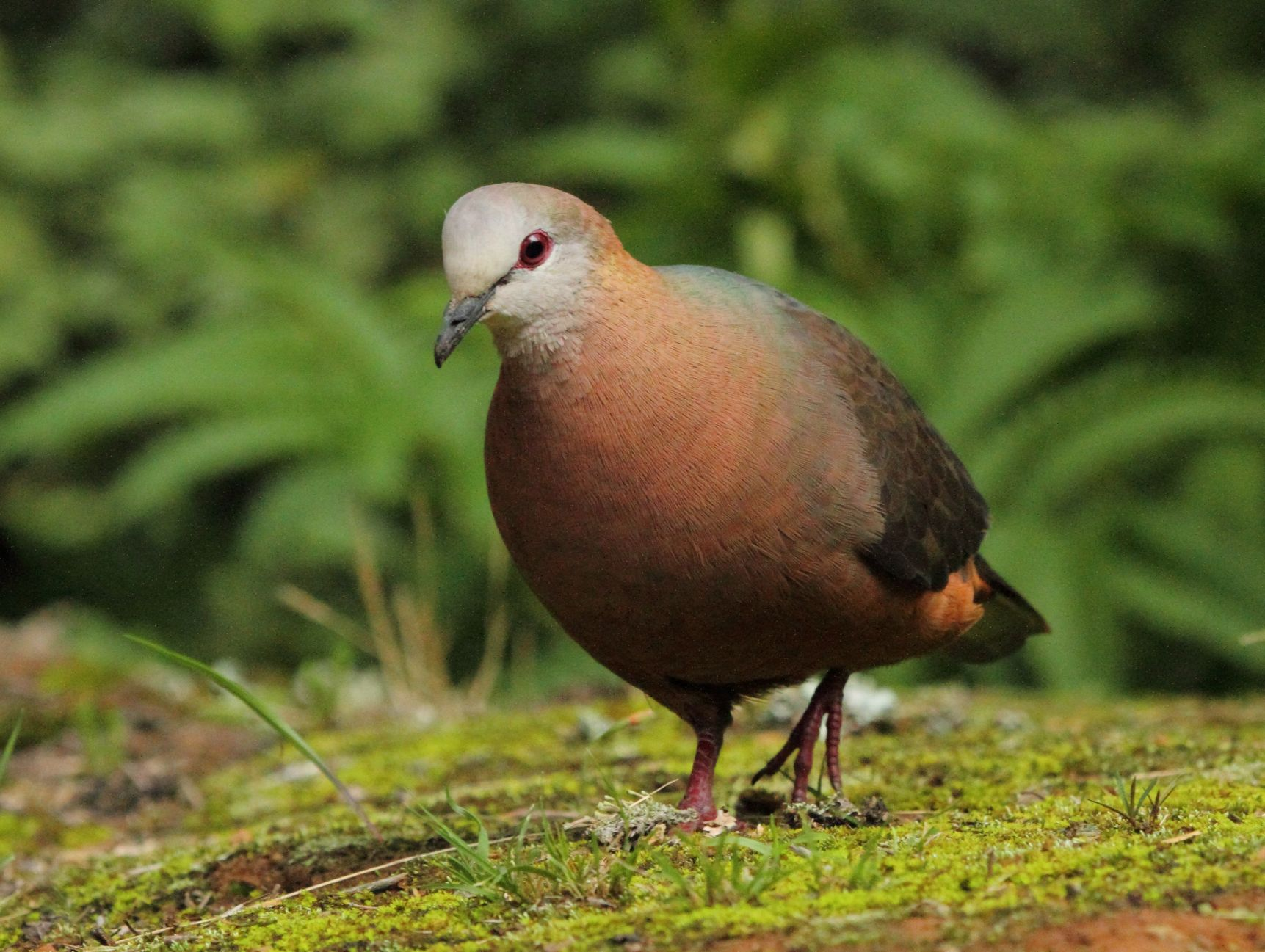
- Adult A. l. larvata at Giant's Castle Game Reserve, South Africa
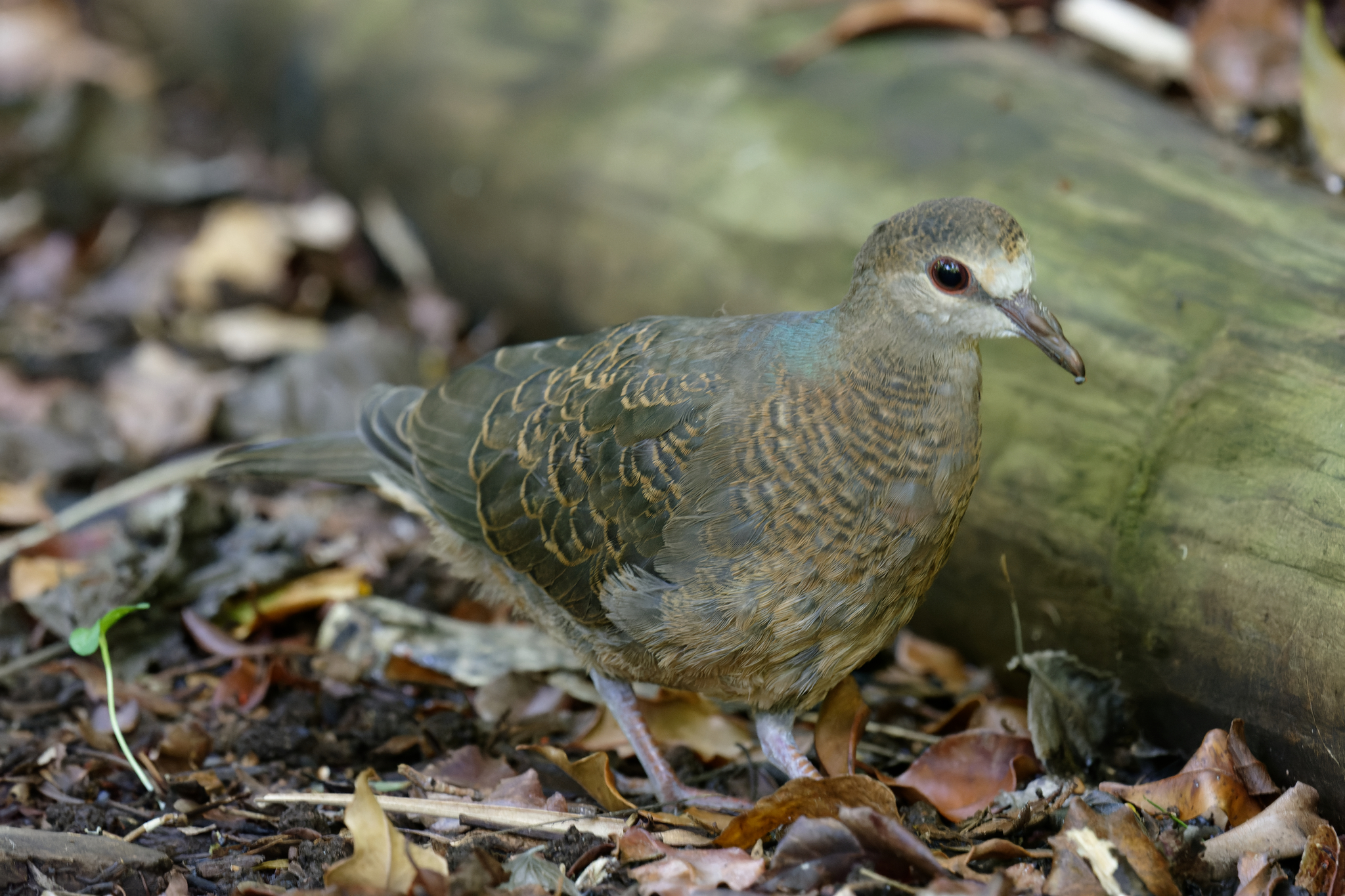
- Juvenile A. l. larvata at Cape Town, South Africa

Conservation status
- Least Concern (IUCN 3.1)

Scientific classification
- Kingdom: Animalia
- Phylum: Chordata
- Class: Aves
- Order: Columbiformes
- Family: Columbidae
- Tribe: Columbini
- Genus: Aplopelia; Bonaparte, 1855
- Species: A. larvata

Binomial name
- Aplopelia larvata (Temminck, 1809)

Synonyms
- Columba larvata

= Lemon dove =

Species of bird

The lemon dove or cinnamon dove (Aplopelia larvata) is a species of bird in the pigeon family Columbidae found in montane forests of sub-Saharan Africa. The lemon dove has a generally brownish-grey plumage with a cinnamon brown breast. Adults have a greenish-glossed neck and white markings on the head, and juveniles are rather more brown with pale feather fringe barring and have greyer facial markings. This dove is a common species, and the International Union for Conservation of Nature has rated its conservation status as being of "least concern".

== Taxonomy ==
The lemon dove was previously placed in the genus Columba, but it differs from the African pigeons of the genus Columba both genetically, in which it is closer to the genus Streptopelia, and by its more strongly terrestrial habits. The population on the island of São Tomé in the Gulf of Guinea, usually considered a subspecies, has been treated as a separate species A. simplex (São Tomé lemon dove; syn. C. simplex) by some authors.

Seven subspecies are recognised:

- A. l. inornata Reichenow, A, 1827 – Sierra Leone to Liberia, southeastern Nigeria, Cameroon, and Gabon; Bioko
- A. l. principalis (Hartlaub, KJG, 1866) – Príncipe (Gulf of Guinea)
- A. l. simplex (Hartlaub, KJG, 1849) – São Tomé (Gulf of Guinea)
- A. l. bronzina (Rüppell, WPES, 1837) – Eritrea, Ethiopia, and southeastern South Sudan (Boma Hills)
- A. l. larvata (Temminck, CJ, 1809) – southern Sudan and central and eastern Uganda to South Africa
- A. l. jacksoni Sharpe, RB, 1904 – eastern Democratic Republic of the Congo and southwestern Uganda to western Tanzania
- A. l. samaliyae White, CMN, 1948 – Angola, southern Democratic Republic of the Congo, and northwestern Zambia

== Description ==
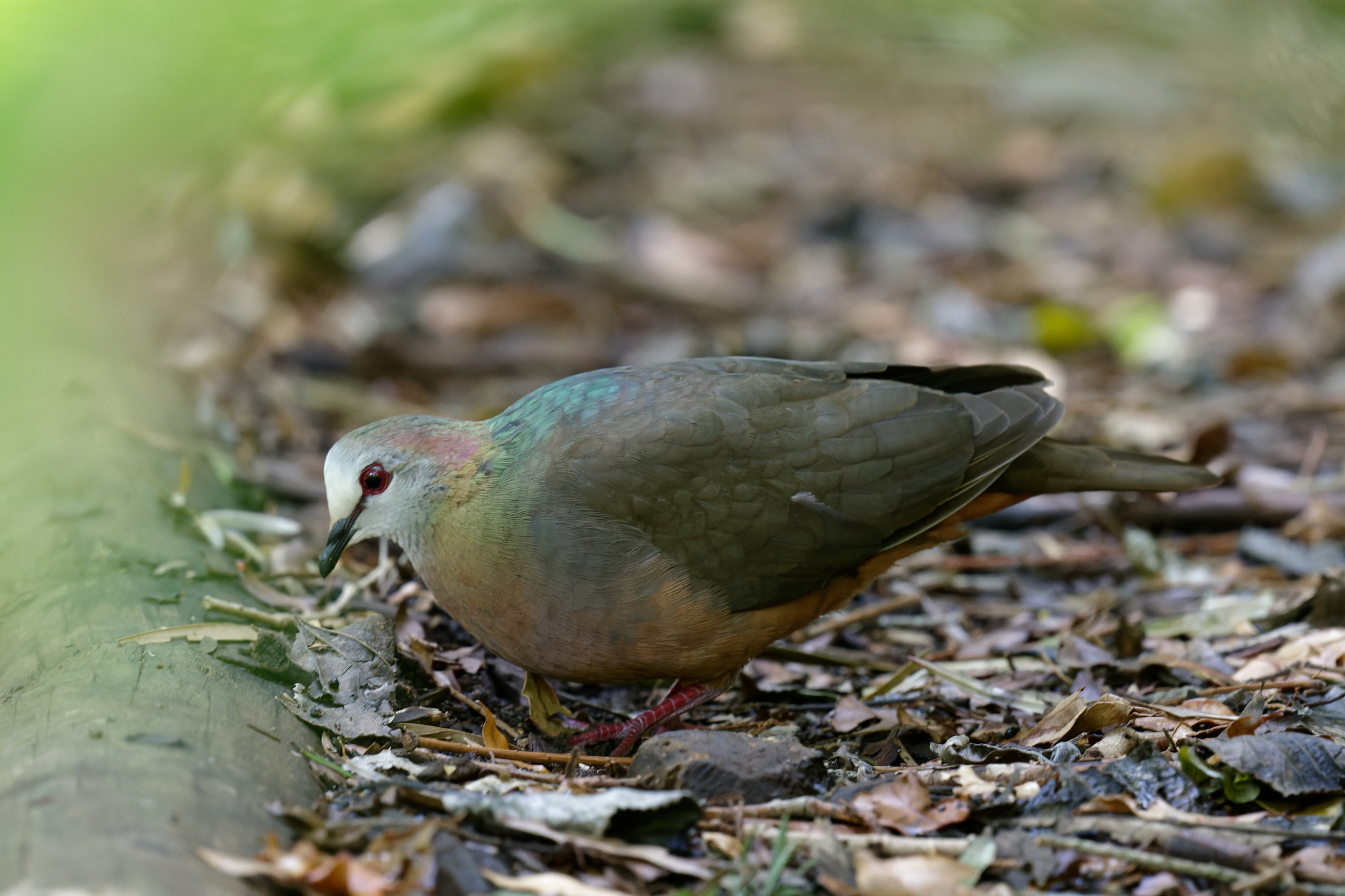
A. l. larvata at Cape Town, South Africa

The lemon dove is fairly small, measuring 24–30 cm (9.4–11.8 in) in length and weighing 81.7–150 g (2.88–5.29 oz). Adults have a plumage that is dark brown above, weakly glossed iridescent greenish to bronze (depending on light angle) on the sides of the neck, and cinnamon brown below, and with a pale whitish face grading into the brown body plumage. The feet, iris and orbital skin are red, the bill is black. Males and females are very similar, though females slightly duller. Juveniles are less iridescent, have lighter brown plumage with pale fringes on the wing covert and body feathers giving a barred appearance, and duller grey facial markings. The western African subspecies have greyer plumage than those of southern and eastern Africa.

== Distribution ==
The lemon dove has a very wide range and is distributed in montane forests in sub-Saharan Africa, ranging from 100 to 3,000 metres (330 to 9,840 ft) altitude in eastern Africa. The diet consists mainly of various small fruits, seeds, molluscs and insects. The female usually lays two creamy white eggs.

== Status and behaviour ==
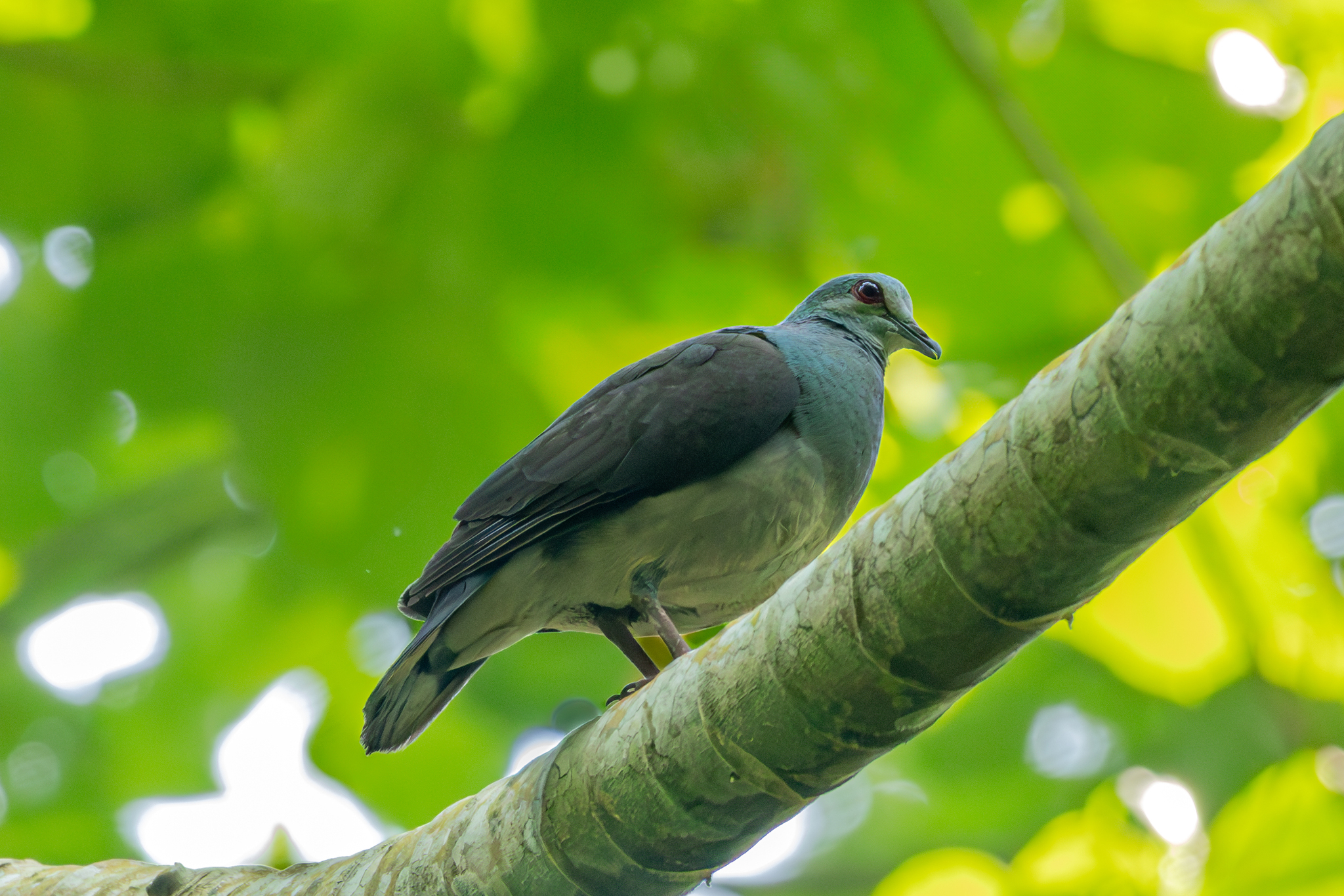
A. l. simplex on São Tomé

Widespread throughout its range, the population trend of the lemon dove is stable and the bird is evaluated as a species of least concern on the IUCN Red List of Threatened Species. In southern Africa, it is fairly common in evergreen forests and plantations close to the south and east coasts, where it mainly feeds on the ground; it is shy and unobtrusive, often heard but not easily seen. It seems to be declining in certain parts of its range; in Tanzania it is not rare above 1,300 metres (4,300 ft) altitude in the Nguu North Forest Reserve, but not at all common in some lower-lying habitat. It is nearly absent from the southeast of that country.

== Sources ==
- Jensen, Flemming P.; Tøttrup, Anders P.; Christensen, Kim D. (2005). "The avifauna of coastal forests in southeast Tanzania" (PDF). Scopus. 25: 1–22. Archived from the original (PDF) on 2 October 2006.
- Seddon, N.; Ekstrom, J.M.M.; Capper, D.R.; Isherwood, I.S.; Muna, R.; Pople, R.G.; Tarimo, E.; Timothy, J. (1999). "The importance of the Nilo and Nguu North Forest Reserves for the conservation of montane forest birds in Tanzania" (PDF). Biological Conservation. 87 (1): 59–72. Bibcode:1999BCons..87...59S. doi:10.1016/S0006-3207(98)00041-X. Archived from the original (PDF) on 14 February 2012.
- Sinclair, Ian; Hockey, Phil; Tarboton, Warwick R. (2002). SASOL Birds of Southern Africa. Cape Town: Struik. ISBN 1-86872-721-1.
