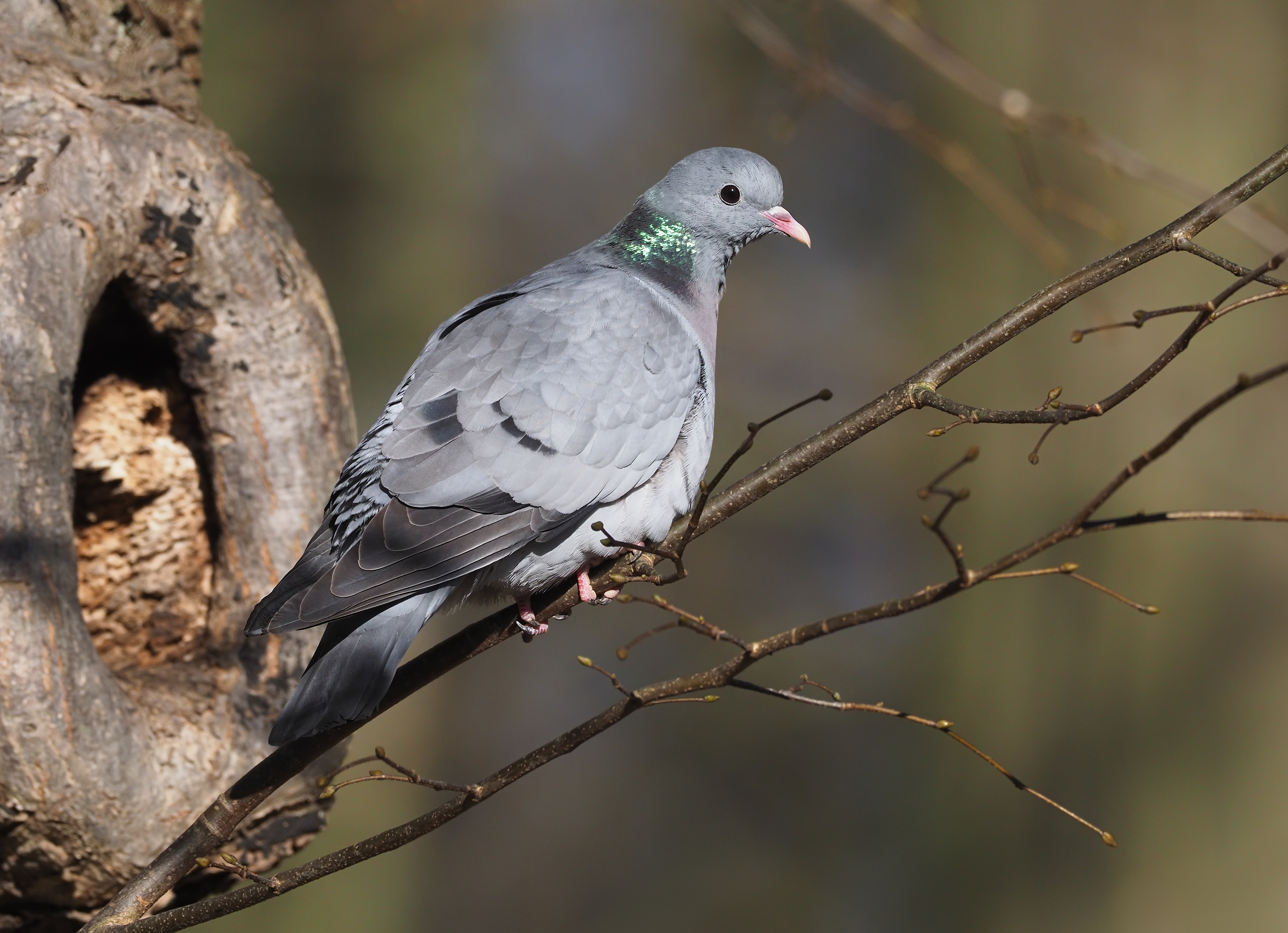
- Adult in Brussels, Belgium

Conservation status
- Least Concern (IUCN 3.1)

Scientific classification
- Kingdom: Animalia
- Phylum: Chordata
- Class: Aves
- Order: Columbiformes
- Family: Columbidae
- Genus: Columba
- Species: C. oenas

Binomial name
- Columba oenas Linnaeus, 1758
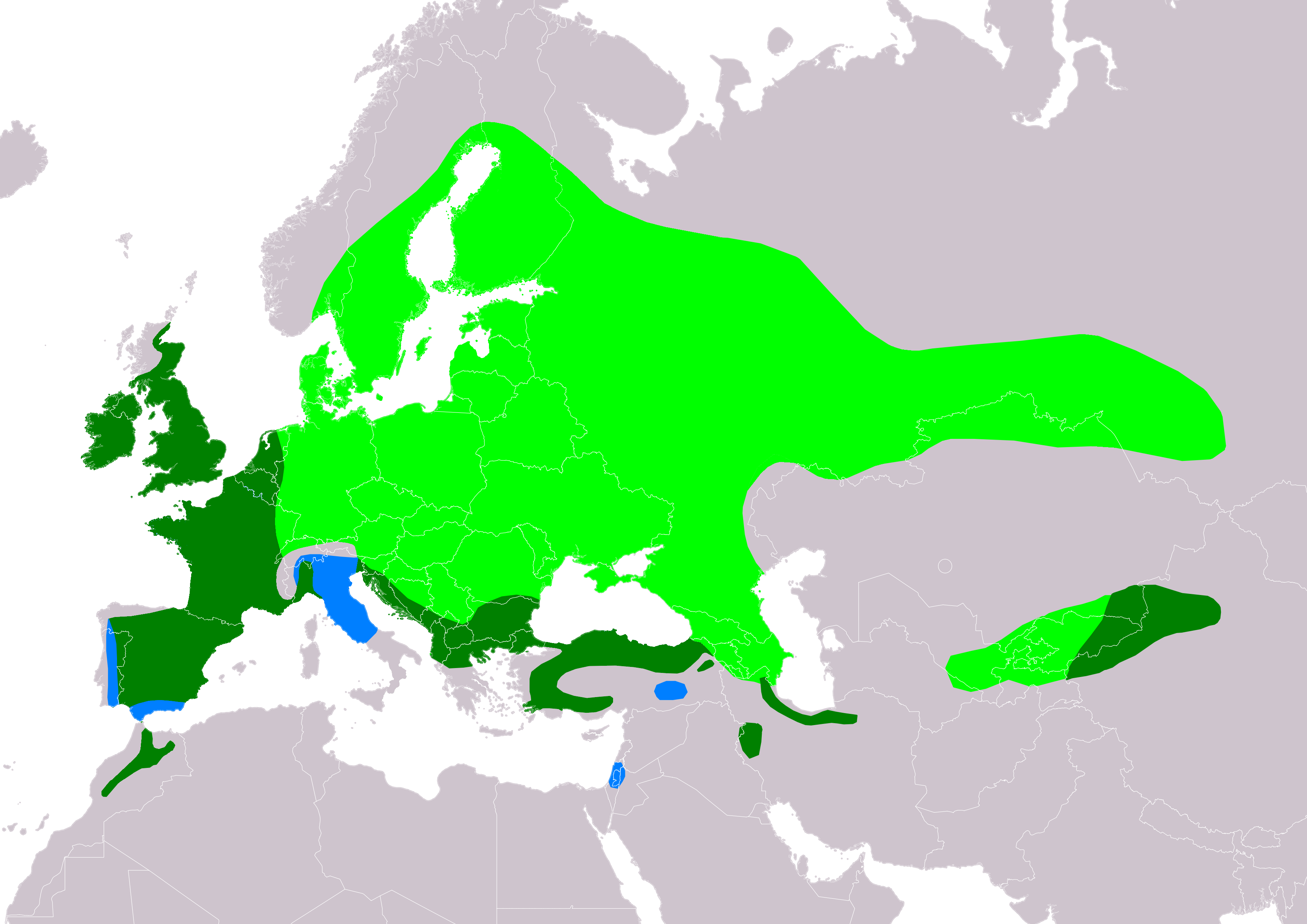
- Range of C. oenas Breeding Resident Non-breeding

= Stock dove =

Species of bird

The stock dove (Columba oenas) is a species of bird in the family Columbidae, the doves and pigeons. It is widely distributed in the western Palearctic, north to central Scandinavia and south to northwest Africa. Western and southern populations are resident, while northeastern populations are migratory to avoid the colder winters there. It is the type species of the genus Columba.

== Taxonomy ==
The stock dove was first formally described by the Swedish naturalist Carl Linnaeus in 1758 in the tenth edition of his Systema Naturae. He placed it with all the other pigeons in the genus Columba and coined the binomial name Columba oenas. The specific name oenas is from the Ancient Greek οἰνάς oinás meaning "pigeon".

Two subspecies are recognised:

- C. o. oenas Linnaeus, 1758 – western Europe and northwestern Africa east to northern Kazakhstan, southwestern Siberia and northern Iran.
- C. o. yarkandensis Buturlin, 1908 – southeastern Kazakhstan and Uzbekistan to western China; slightly paler than C. o. oenas.

== Description ==
The stock dove is 28–34 cm (11–13 in) long, with a wingspan of 60–66 cm (24–26 in) and a weight of 303–365 g in males, 286–290 g in females. The plumage is a blue-toned grey, with two short dark grey to blackish wingbars on the tertials and greater coverts, and a broad dark grey bar at the tip of the tail. The breast is lightly suffused pinkish-purple, and the sides of the neck have an iridescent patch varying between green and purple depending on the angle of incident light. The eyes are dark, and the bill pink with a yellow tip. The male and female are indistinguishable on plumage, though males are slightly larger; juveniles are also similar, but lack the iridescent neck patch. In flight, the grey wings show a dark trailing edge; the underwing is also dark grey, unlike the white underwing of the rock dove. The short, deep, "grunting" Ooo-uu-ooh call is quite distinct from the modulated cooing notes of the common wood pigeon.

The stock dove belongs to the genus Columba in the pigeon family. Members of this family are typically pale grey or brown, sometimes with white markings on the head or neck, and usually with iridescent green or purple patches on the neck and breast. The neck feathers may be stiffened and aligned to form grooves, though this is less obvious in this species. The three western European Columba pigeons have distinctive characteristics. The common wood pigeon can be easily identified by its large size, pale yellow eyes, and the white on its neck (in adults) and wings. The rock dove and stock dove are more similar in size and plumage, but wild specimens of the former have brighter eyes and a white rump, as well as two distinct dark bars on the wing, while the rump of the stock dove is grey and its wing bars are incomplete.

The stock dove is both sociable and gregarious. It often associates with wood pigeons and, occasionally, with rock doves.

== Ecology ==
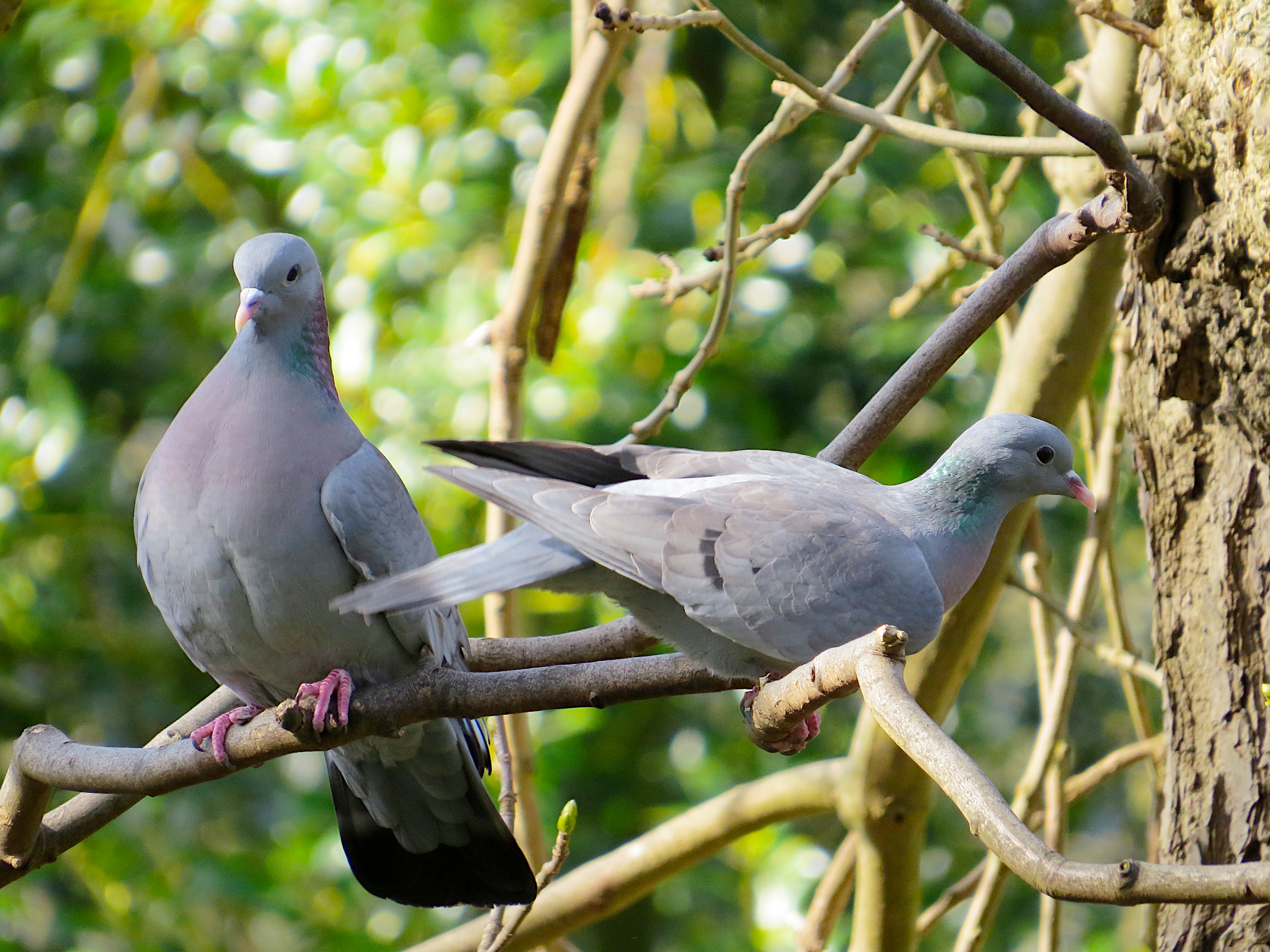
Pair of stock doves in courtship display outside their nest hole

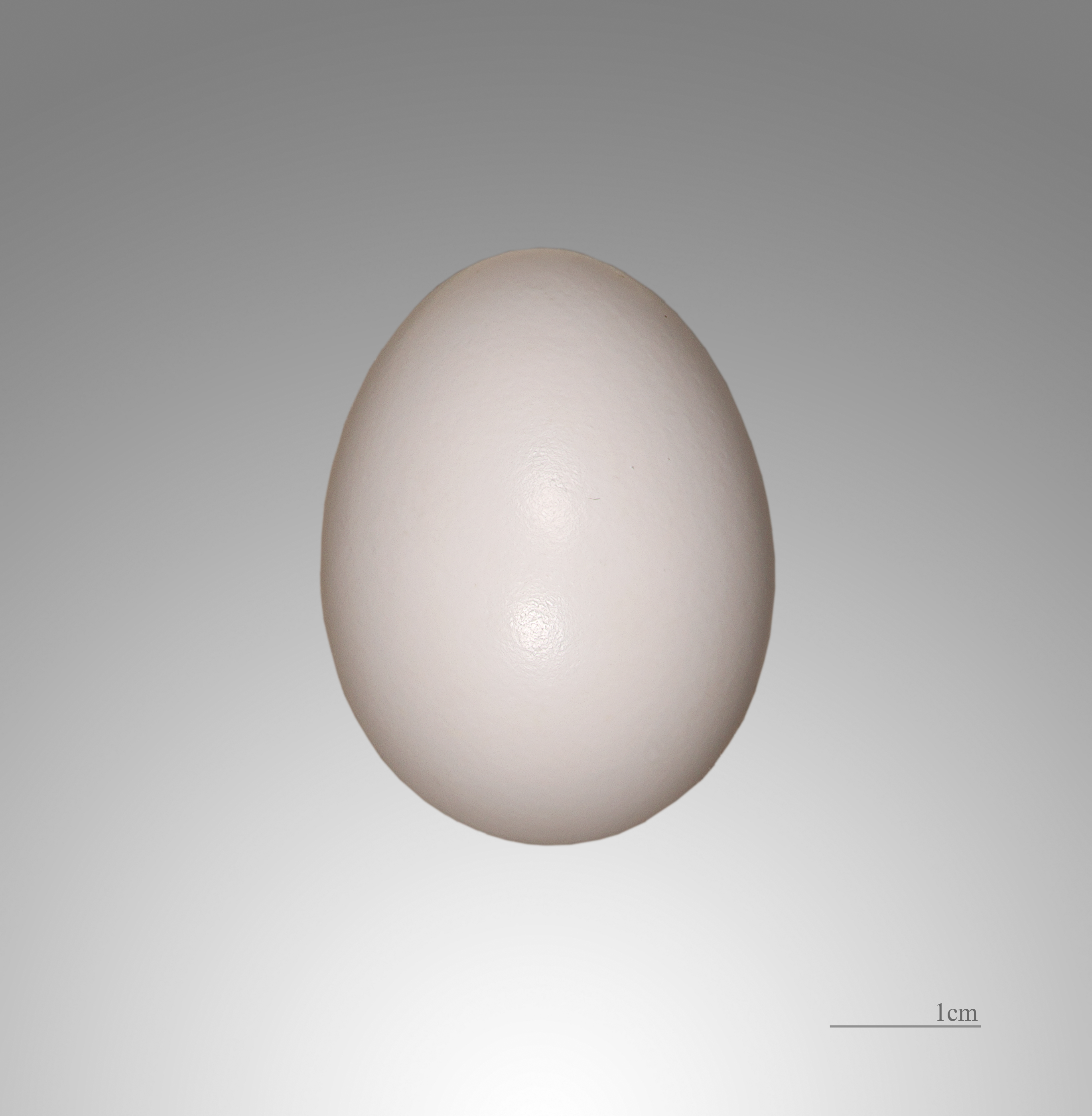
Columba oenas egg

The stock dove is common in its ideal habitat, but never as abundant as the common wood pigeon. It typically forms flocks of a few to a few tens, very rarely hundreds, unlike with wood pigeons which often form flocks of thousands. It is a migrant in part of its European and western Asiatic range. There has been a sharp decline in France (−57% in 1976). Although the species is not considered threatened in Europe, it is classified in Schedule 2 of the Birds Directive and Annex III the Berne Convention. Around 100,000 to 200,000 individuals winter in France. Over half of the European stock dove population is found in the UK.

The nest is usually found in a hole in an old tree. Before deforestation, the stock dove was the most common pigeon, nesting primarily in oak or pine forests. However, as it typically nests in tree cavities, it was normally only found in old forests. In plantations there are not as many holes to nest in, so it is scarcer there. Additionally, as the stock dove is double-brooded, requiring two holes for its broods. It has been observed nesting in rabbit burrows, ruins, old poplar hedges, cracks in crags or cliff faces, in ivy, and in the thick growth around the boles of lime trees. It will also use nest boxes. The cavity should be about 75 centimetres deep, with a hole big enough to fit a fist through. Although they seldom use nesting material, the young leave the hole very oily. Stock doves prefer to nest close together. Outside of the breeding season, stock doves may also roost in cavities. Like most doves and pigeons, they lay two eggs per clutch, though nests containing up to six eggs have been found and are believed to be the result of dump-nesting by other females.

The stock dove generally inhabits open wooded areas. Although it nests in trees, it does not prefer densely wooded areas. It is also common on coasts, where cliffs provide suitable nesting sites.

Its flight is quick and regular, with the occasional sharp flick of the wings that is characteristic of pigeons. It perches well and, during the nuptial display, walks along a horizontal branch with a swollen neck, lowered wings and fanned tail. During the circling spring flight, its wings crack smartly like a whip.

Its diet consists mainly of plant material; it favours young shoots and seedlings, but will also eat grain, insects and snails. In some areas, its diet consists mainly of acorns and pine seeds. Its varied diet includes berries such as bay and hawthorn, figs, cereal grains, beans, peas and small invertebrates obtained while foraging on the ground. During their autumn migration in October, stock doves stop at places with an abundance of acorns and supplement their diet with shoots and leaves.

== Etymology ==
The common name stock dove, attested from 1340 as "stok-dowe", has caused some confusion about the origins of this bird. The word "stock" in the common name of this species comes from the Old English stocc' meaning "stump, post, stake, tree trunk, log". Therefore, "stock dove" means roughly "a dove which lives in hollow trees".

An exercise to give all of the world's birds a standard, international-use English name led to a proposal in 1988 to rename the species as "stock pigeon" for systematic reasons (so that all Columba species were "pigeons" rather than "doves"). This was taken up in the 7th edition of the British List in 2006 alongside the traditional vernacular name stock dove. However, in 2006, the International Ornithological Congress (now the International Ornithological Union) published the first results of their standardised English names project, in which stock pigeon was replaced with stock dove, and this change was adopted in the eighth edition of the British List in 2013.

The genus name Columba is the Latin word meaning "pigeon, dove", whose older etymology comes from the Ancient Greek κόλυμβος (kolumbos), "a diver", from κολυμβάω (kolumbao), "dive, plunge headlong, swim". Aristophanes (Birds, 304) and others use the word κολυμβίς (kolumbis), "diver", for the name of the bird, because of its swimming motion in the air.
