= Yellow-legged pigeon =

Conservation status
- Vulnerable (IUCN 3.1)

Scientific classification
- Kingdom: Animalia
- Phylum: Chordata
- Class: Aves
- Order: Columbiformes
- Family: Columbidae
- Genus: Columba
- Species: C. pallidiceps

Binomial name
- Columba pallidiceps (Ramsay, EP, 1878)

Species of bird

The yellow-legged pigeon (Columba pallidiceps) is a bird species in the family Columbidae. It is found in the Bismarck and Solomon archipelagos. Its natural habitats are subtropical or tropical moist lowland forests and subtropical or tropical moist montane forests. It is threatened by habitat loss. It was formerly classified as Endangered by the IUCN. But new research has shown it to be not as rare as it was believed; consequently, it was downlisted to Vulnerable in 2008.
