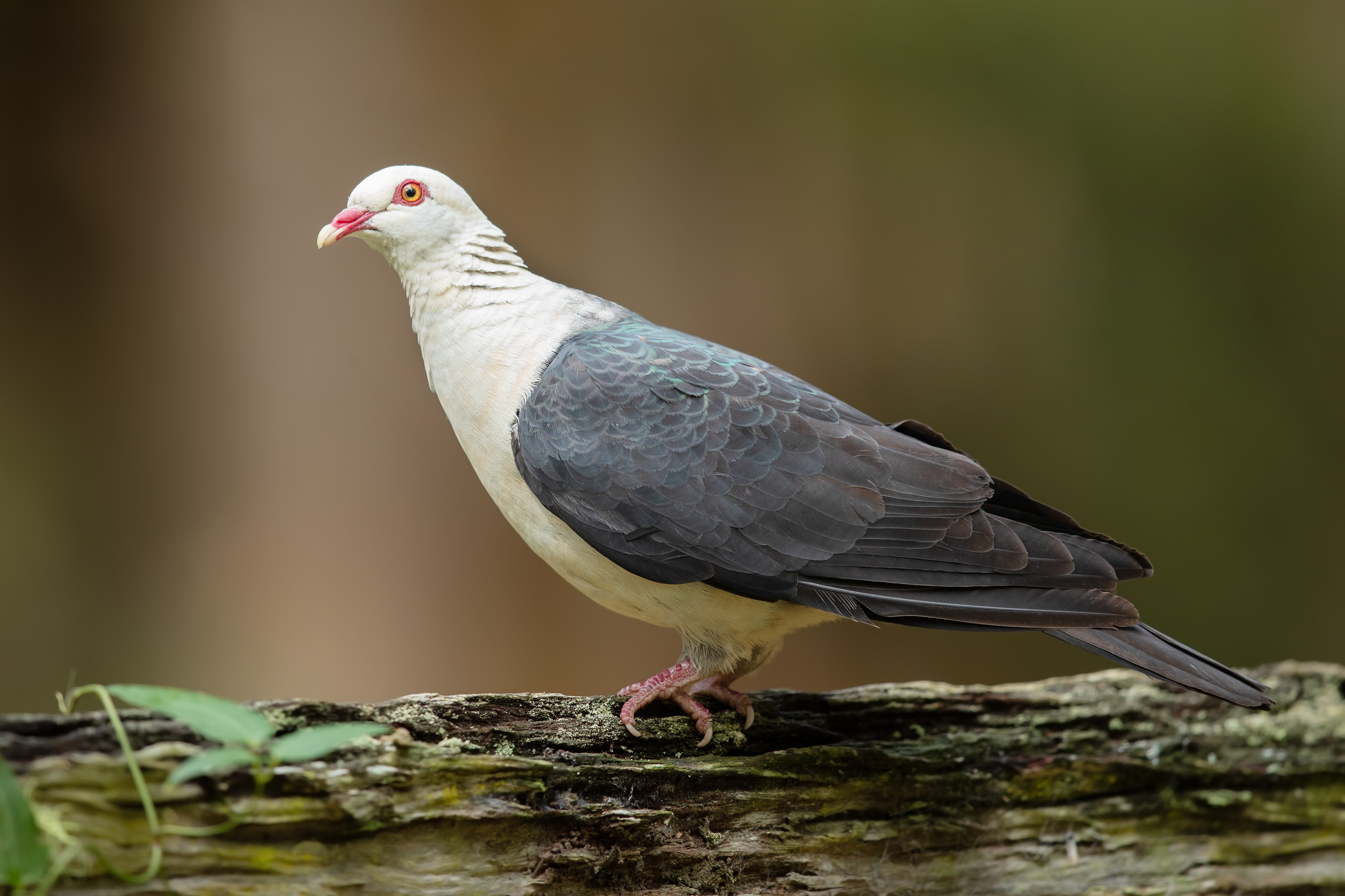
- male
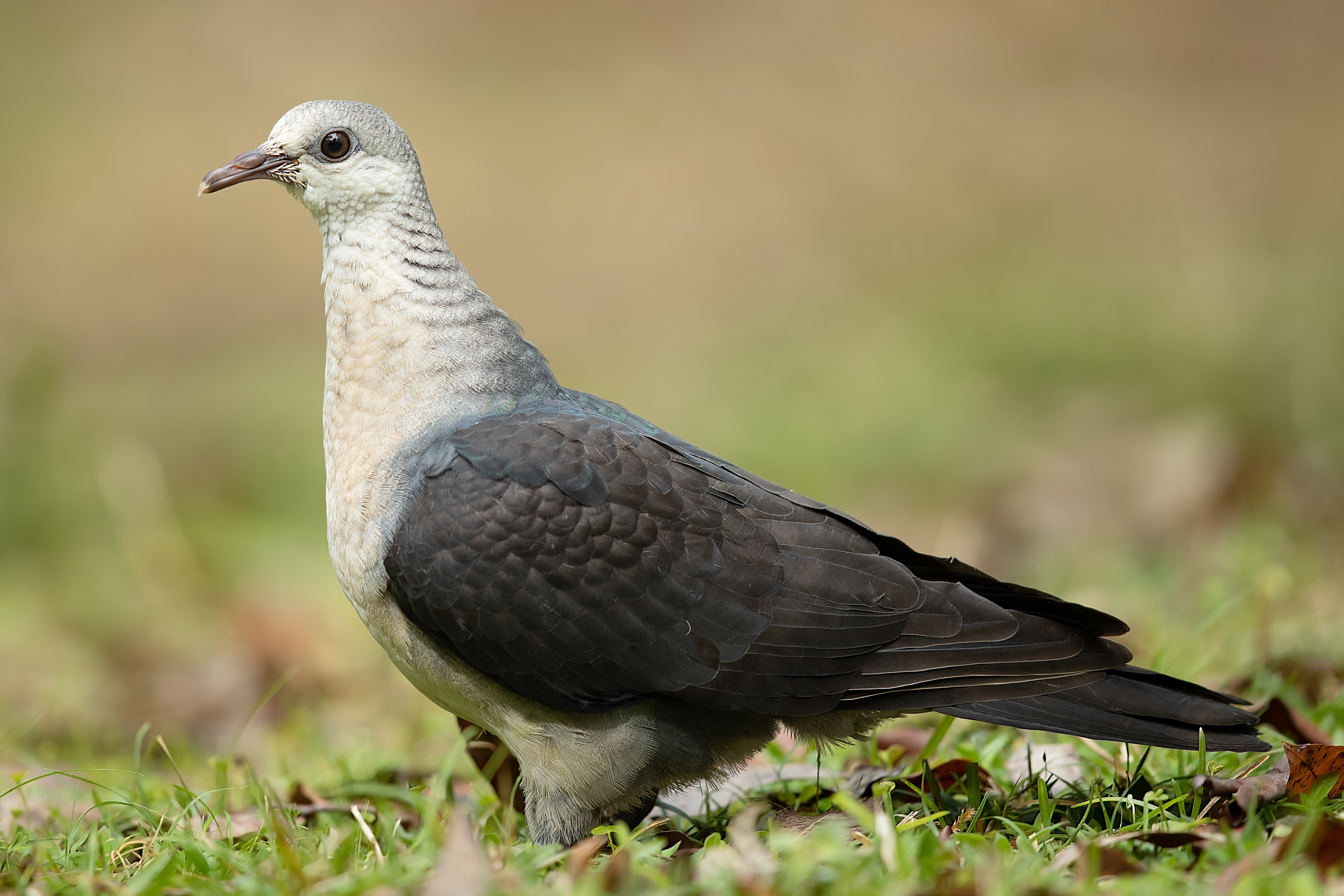
- female

Conservation status
- Least Concern (IUCN 3.1)

Scientific classification
- Kingdom: Animalia
- Phylum: Chordata
- Class: Aves
- Order: Columbiformes
- Family: Columbidae
- Genus: Columba
- Species: C. leucomela

Binomial name
- Columba leucomela Temminck, 1821
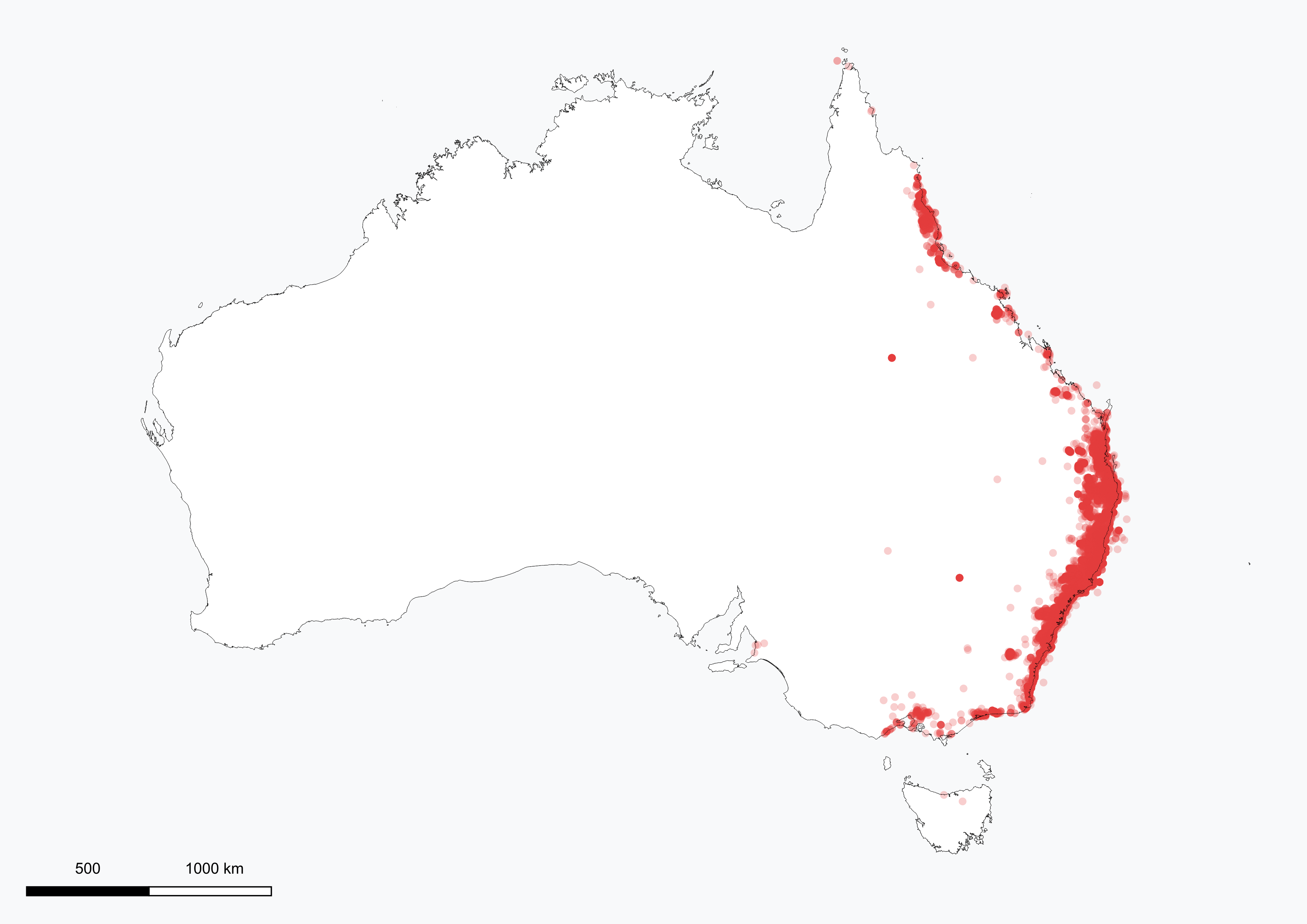
- Distribution of the white-headed pigeon

= White-headed pigeon =

Species of bird

The white-headed pigeon (Columba leucomela) is a pigeon native to the east coast of Australia.

== Taxonomy and systematics ==
The pigeon family is a group of stout-bodied birds with short necks and short slender bills with a worldwide distribution. The white-headed pigeon is in the genus Columba, the same as the Rock dove (C. livia) from which the domestic pigeon is derived. It has no subspecies.

The white-headed pigeon was originally classified as C. norfolciensis, but the 1953 discovery of an 18th-century painting indicated that the description was likely for a different bird on Norfolk Island, perhaps the Pacific emerald dove (Chalcophaps longirostris). It is most closely related to the metallic pigeon (C. vitiensis).

== Description ==
The white-headed pigeon draws its name from its distinctive white head, neck, breast, and belly. In males, the wings are slate grey, along with the tail. The upper parts are grey black, with a green or purple iridescence. The bill is pink to dark red, but with a yellow or white tip. The legs and feet are pink to red. Females appear similar to males, but their white colouration is less brilliant and more muddied. Juveniles are similar to females, but with a greyer head and darker gray underparts. Juveniles have greyer feet, legs, and bills, with the bill white tipped. Adults range from 38–42 cm (15–17 in) from beak to tail, and weigh around 420 g (15 oz).

The eye ring and legs are red and the eyes are pale orange or yellow.

Their call is loud and gruff sounding like "WHOO!" followed by a gruff inhalation sounding "uk" (repeated three times). Sometimes the call is a low "oom".

== Distribution and habitat ==
The pigeon's habitat is from Cooktown, Queensland to southern New South Wales, with increasing numbers now found in eastern Victoria. It can commonly be found in tropical regions, subtropical rainforest, scrub, watercourses and street trees. Since colonisation of Australia, their numbers have decreased but they have thrived on the introduced Camphor laurel (Cinnamomum camphora).

== Behaviour and ecology ==
The white-headed pigeon's nest generally consists of scanty twigs and is usually placed high in canopy up to 18 metres. It tends to lay one cream-white egg. Breeding is mostly from October to December.

These pigeons are often found alone, in pairs or in small flocks. They are very quiet and elusive. Their flight is swift and direct.

=== Feeding ===
This bird's diet consists of fruits and seeds, with its favourite food being the invasive camphor laurel (Cinnamomum camphora). White-headed pigeons will consume buds, flowers, leaves, and ripe and unripe fruits of the camphor laurel year-round. They feed in tree canopies alone or small groups, but may also feed on the ground from time to time. Larger groups may gather when feeding on camphor laurels, up to 100. It also eats fallen grains in cornfields.

== Status ==
Due to its large range, and an increasing population, the white-headed pigeon is considered a least-concern species.
