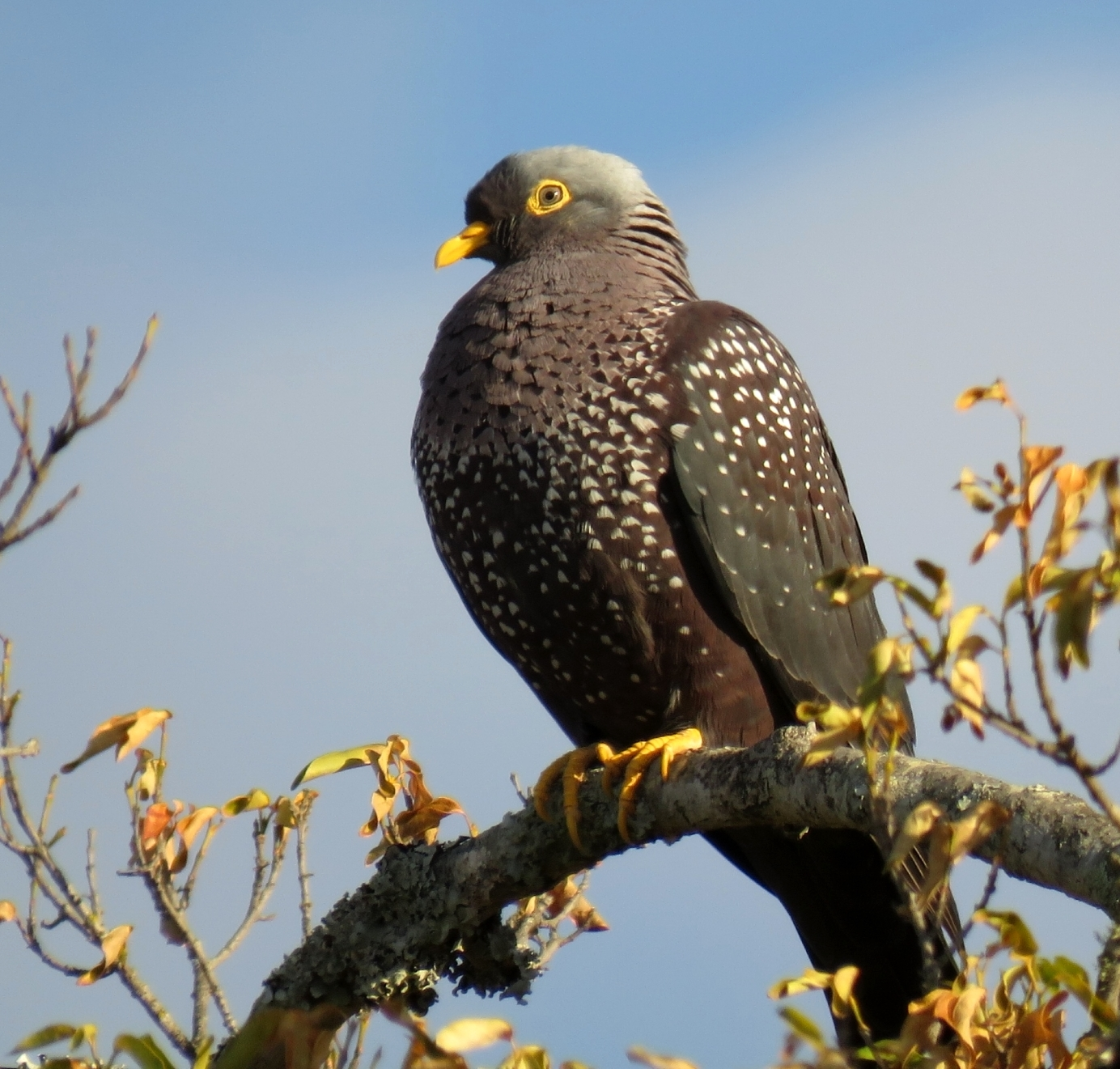
- African olive pigeon in Addo Elephant National Park, South Africa

Conservation status
- Least Concern (IUCN 3.1)

Scientific classification
- Kingdom: Animalia
- Phylum: Chordata
- Class: Aves
- Order: Columbiformes
- Family: Columbidae
- Genus: Columba
- Species: C. arquatrix

Binomial name
- Columba arquatrix Temminck, 1808
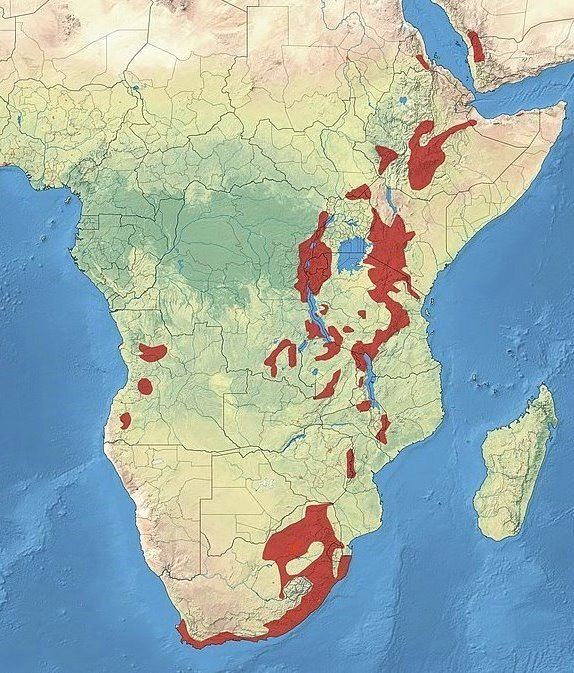
- distribution

= African olive pigeon =

Species of bird

The African olive pigeon or Rameron pigeon (Columba arquatrix) is a pigeon which is a resident breeding bird in much of eastern and southern Africa from Ethiopia to the Cape. Populations also are found in western Angola, southwestern Saudi Arabia and northern Yemen. It is locally common, although sizeable gaps in its distribution occur due to its habitat requirements. Despite this, the species is monotypic, with no substantive variation between birds in the different areas it occurs in.

== Description ==
The adult male African olive pigeon is a large pigeon at 37 to 42 cm (15 to 17 in) in length and a weight of 300 to 450 g (11 to 16 oz). Its back and wings are maroon, with the shoulders heavily speckled with white spots. The underparts are maroon with heavy white spotting, and the head is grey with yellow patches around the eye, and a yellow bill. The neck plumage, used in display, is streaked maroon and white, the underwing and undertail are dark grey, and the feet are yellow.

Females are very similar to males but somewhat duller. Juvenile birds have the maroon and grey replaced with dark brown, the bare parts are a dull greenish-yellow, and the wing feathers have pale fringes. In flight, this pigeon looks very dark. Its flight is quick, with the regular beats and an occasional sharp flick of the wings which are characteristic of pigeons in general. The call is a loud coo coo.

== Habitat ==
This is a species of cool, moist forest canopies above 1,400 m (4,600 ft) altitude, although it occurs locally as low as 700 m (2,300 ft). It will use mountain fynbos, second growth, and clearings, and feed on agricultural land when not persecuted.

== Behaviour ==
=== Breeding ===
The African olive pigeon builds a large stick nest up to 15 m (50 ft) high in a tree and lays one (rarely two) white eggs. The eggs are incubated for 17–20 days to hatching, and the chicks fledge in another 20 days.

The male has a display consisting of deep bows, and a display flight which consists of a climb, wing clapping, and slow glide down.

=== Feeding ===
The African olive pigeon feeds on fruit and berries, mainly picked in the canopy, but it will also descend for fallen fruit and prey on insects and caterpillars. In the south of its range, it favours the fruit of a highly invasive plant, the bugweed, Solanum mauritianum. Birds fly considerable distances from their roosts to feeding areas, and young or nonbreeding birds form flocks.

Geophagy, which is the act of Earth eating, has been observed in this species. The African olive pigeon has been found to eat clay soil of basic pH and high sodium content. Based on current studies, this is for the purpose of supplementing their diet with minerals and as a pH buffer due to their acidic diet.

== Gallery ==
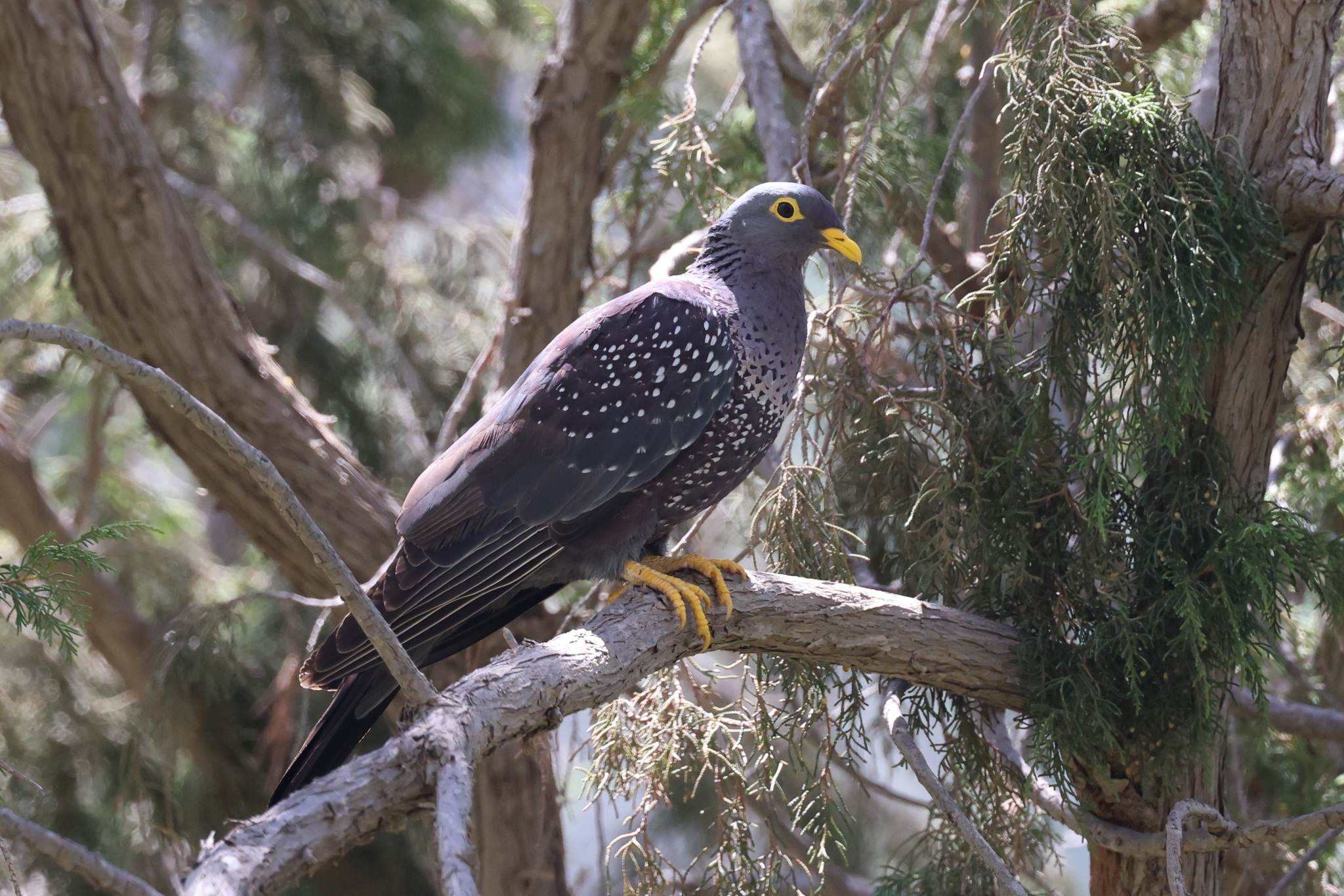
In the Asir Mountains, Saudi Arabia

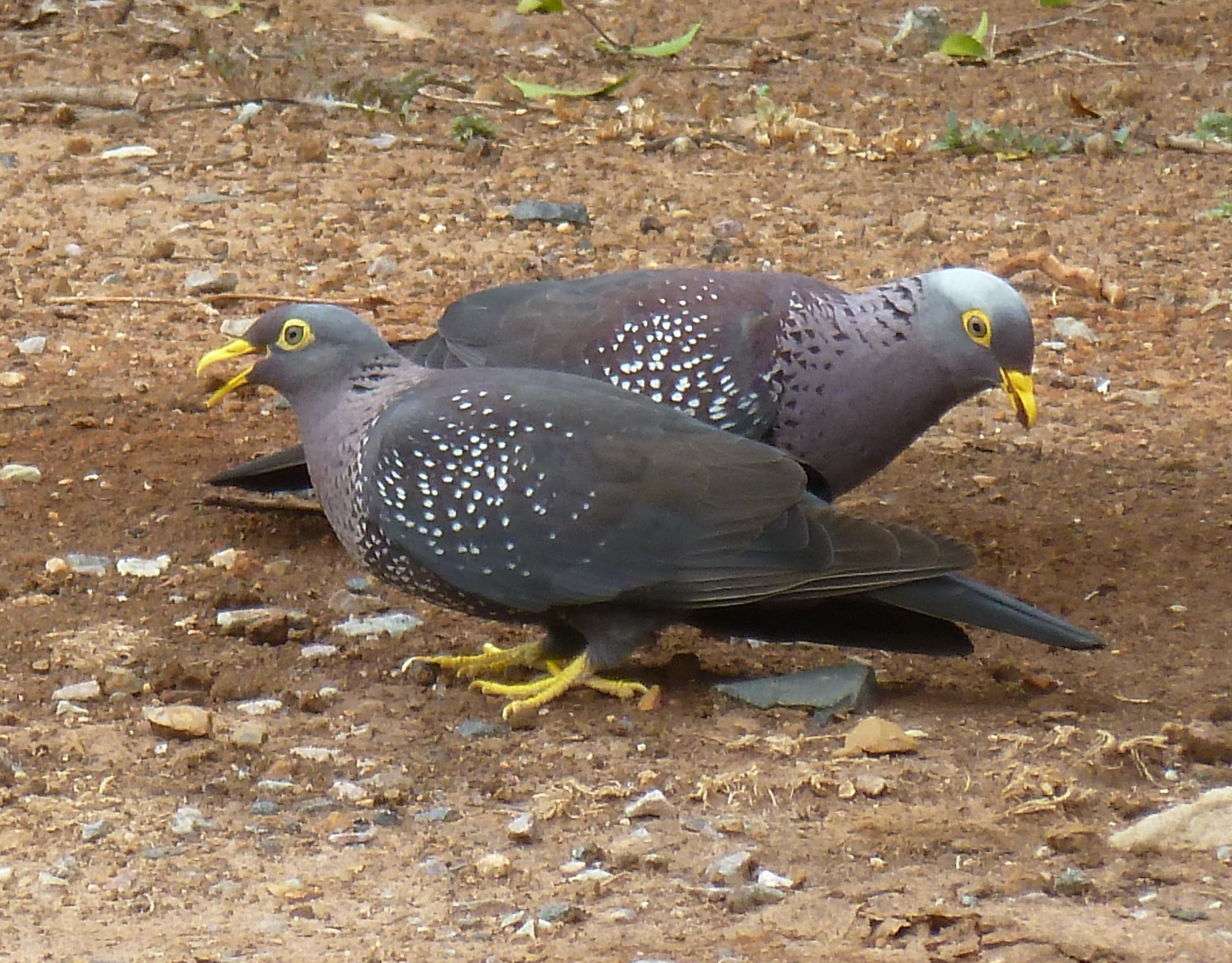
At a clay lick

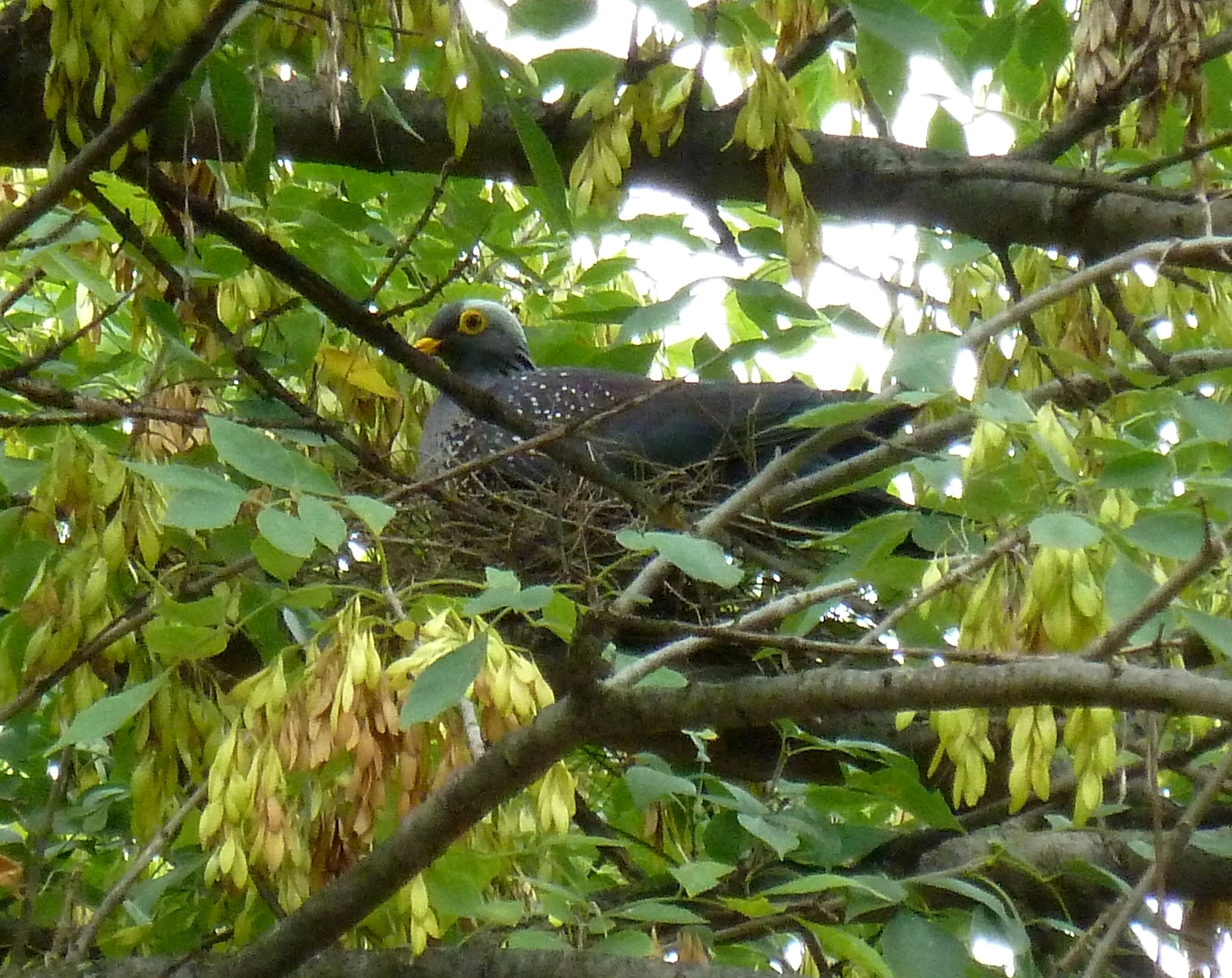
Nesting
