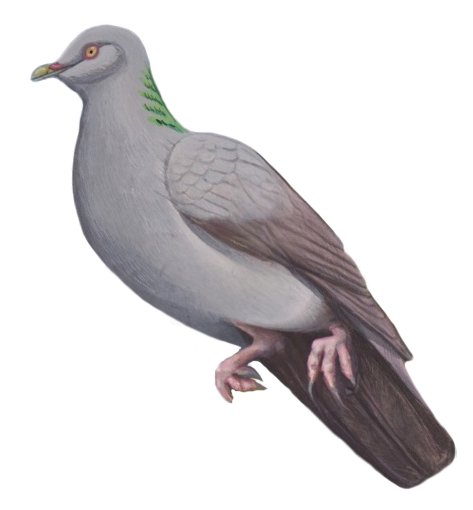
- Life restoration by Julian P. Hume

Conservation status
- Extinct (1735) (IUCN 3.1)

Scientific classification
- Kingdom: Animalia
- Phylum: Chordata
- Class: Aves
- Order: Columbiformes
- Family: Columbidae
- Genus: Columba
- Species: †C. thiriouxi

Binomial name
- †Columba thiriouxi Hume, 2011
- Former range

= Mauritian wood pigeon =

Extinct species of bird

The Mauritian wood pigeon (Columba thiriouxi) is an extinct species of the pigeon genus Columba which was endemic to Mauritius. It was a small, likely arboreal, wood pigeon.

== Taxonomy ==
The Mauritian wood pigeon was described in 2011 by English paleontologist Julian P. Hume. The holotype is a right tarsometatarsus subfossil collected in 1910 by Etienne Thirioux, an amateur fossil collector, from a cave in the Vallée des Prêtres in central east Mauritius. The specific epithet, thiriouxi, is in honor of Thirioux.

== Extinction ==
Very little is known about the Mauritian wood pigeon. It was apparently easily caught, and likely became extinct around 1730 due to overhunting, predation by introduced black rats (Rattus rattus), and deforestation.
