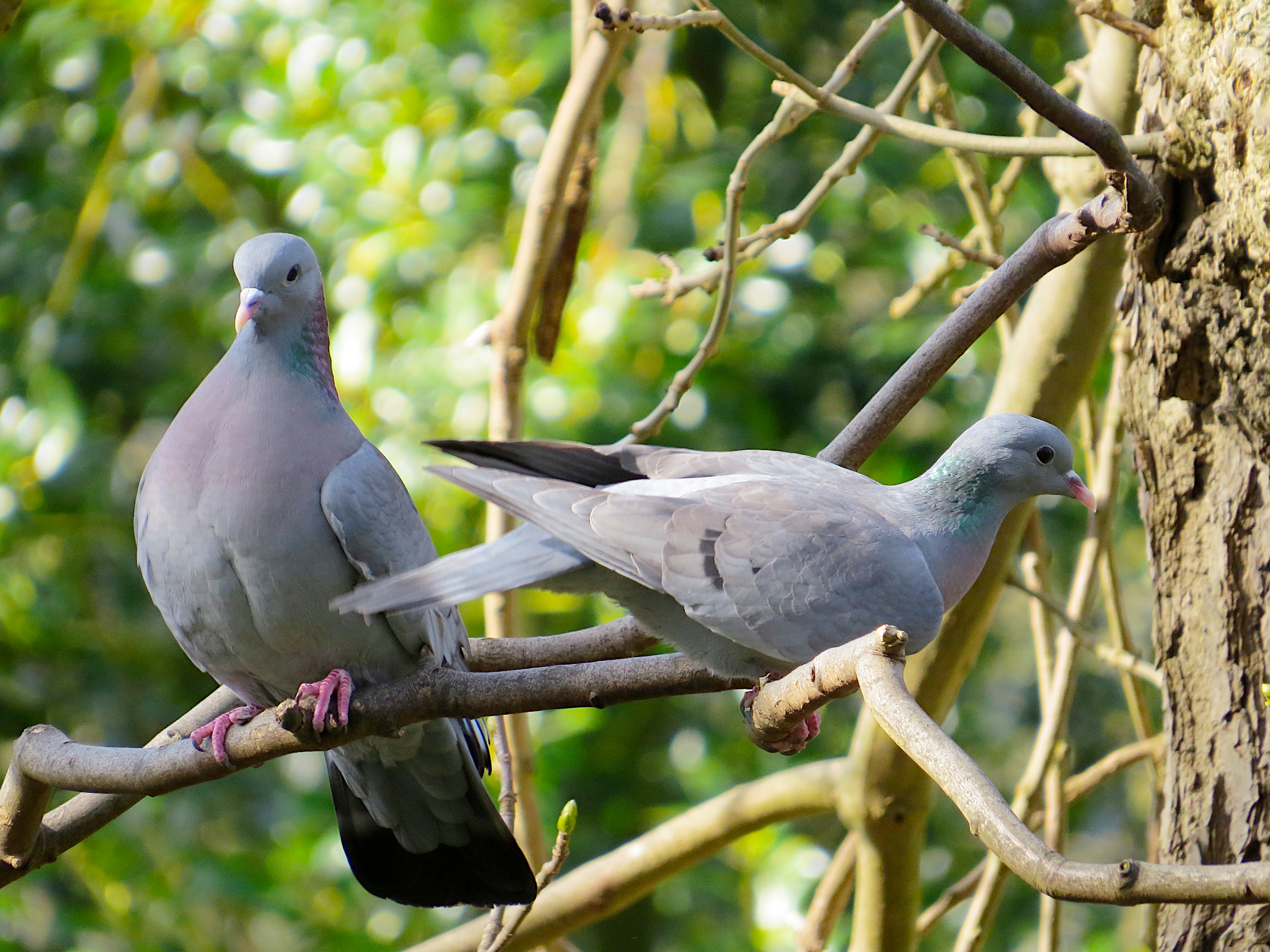
- Stock doves in Northumberland, England

Scientific classification
- Kingdom: Animalia
- Phylum: Chordata
- Class: Aves
- Order: Columbiformes
- Family: Columbidae
- Tribe: Columbini
- Genus: Columba; Linnaeus, 1758

Type species
- Columba oenas Linnaeus, 1758

Diversity
- 33–35 species

Synonyms
- Trocaza Bonaparte, 1854

= Columba (genus) =

Genus of pigeons

The bird genus Columba comprises a genus of medium to large pigeons. The terms "dove" and "pigeon" are used indiscriminately for smaller and larger Columbidae, respectively. Columba species are mostly termed "pigeons", and in many cases "wood pigeons", but some (including the type species of the genus), are termed "doves". The rock dove (C. livia) has given rise to the majority of domesticated pigeon breeds, such as the racing pigeon and the fantail pigeon, some of which have become feral. Meanwhile, "wood pigeon" by itself usually means the common wood pigeon (C. palumbus).

This genus as understood today is native to the Old World, but some (notably the domestic and feral rock dove) have been introduced outside their natural range, for example in the Americas.

== Etymology ==
The term columba comes from the Latin columba, "a dove", the feminine form of columbus, "a male dove", itself the latinisation of the Greek κόλυμβος (kolumbos), "diver", which derives from the verb κολυμβάω (kolumbaō), "to dive, plunge headlong, swim". The feminine form of kolumbos, κολυμβίς (kolumbis), "diver", was the name applied by Aristophanes and others to the common rock doves of Greece, because of the "swimming" motion made by their wings when flying.

== Taxonomy ==
The genus Columba was introduced by the Swedish naturalist Carl Linnaeus in 1758 in the tenth edition of his Systema Naturae. The type species was designated as the stock dove (Columba oenas) by Irish zoologist Nicholas Aylward Vigors in 1825.

The American pigeons formerly included in Columba are now split off as a separate genus Patagioenas. That the American radiation constitutes a distinct lineage is borne out by molecular evidence; in fact, the genus Patagioenas is basal to the split between the genus Columba and the genus Streptopelia. Columba, together with Streptopelia and the smaller genera Nesoenas and Spilopelia (syn. Stigmatopelia), constitute the dominant evolutionary radiation of the subfamily Columbinae in Eurasia and Africa. The taxonomic status of some African pigeons presently placed here is in need of further study; they are smaller than the usual Columba, and differ in some other aspects. The lemon dove, until recently classified as Columba larvata, has now been separated into its own genus Aplopelia, as Aplopelia larvata. That notwithstanding, the lineage of the typical pigeons probably diverged from its closest relatives in the Late Miocene, perhaps some 7-8 million years ago (Ma).

=== Species ===
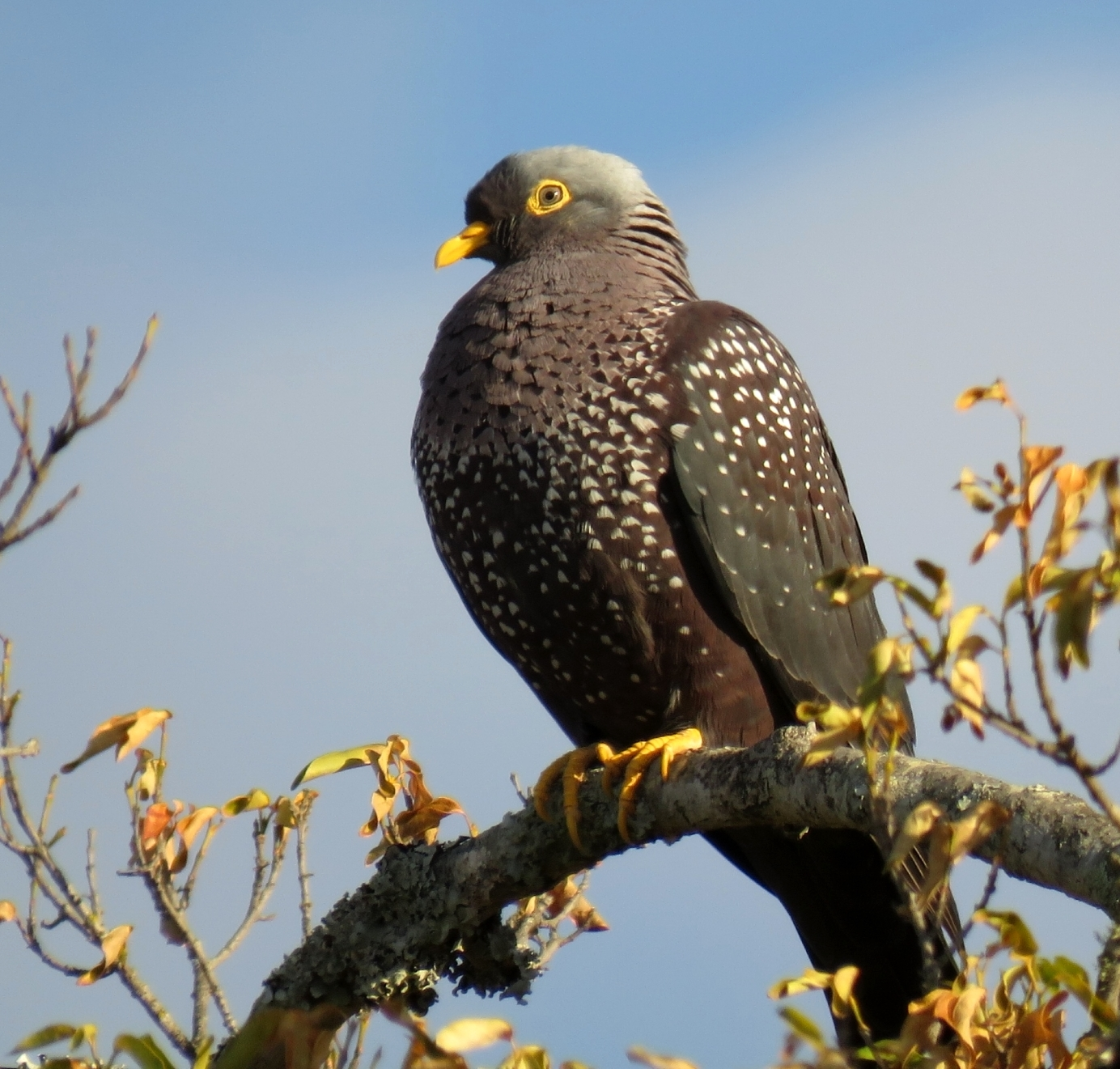
African olive pigeon (C. arquatrix)

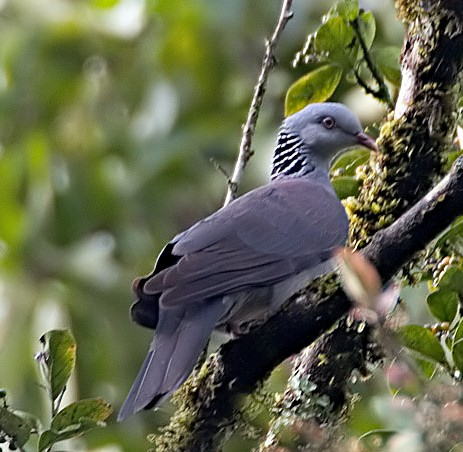
Nilgiri wood pigeon (C. elphinstonii)

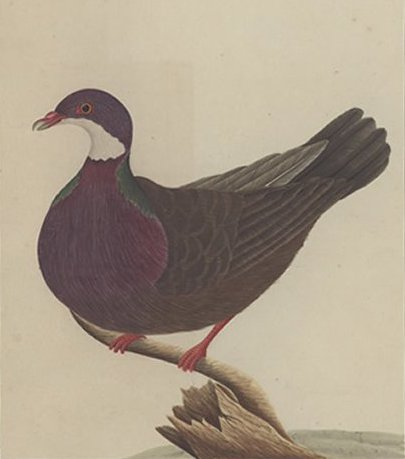
The extinct Lord Howe pigeon (C. vitiensis godmanae) is known only from some travellers' reports

There are 34 species recognised in the genus, of which two are extinct:

- Rock dove, Columba livia
- Hill pigeon, Columba rupestris
- Snow pigeon, Columba leuconota
- Speckled pigeon, Columba guinea
- White-collared pigeon, Columba albitorques
- Stock dove, Columba oenas
- Yellow-eyed pigeon, Columba eversmanni
- Somali pigeon, Columba oliviae
- Common wood pigeon or wood pigeon, Columba palumbus
- Trocaz pigeon, Columba trocaz
- Bolle's pigeon, Columba bollii
- Laurel pigeon, Columba junoniae
- Afep pigeon, Columba unicincta
- African olive pigeon, Columba arquatrix
- Cameroon olive pigeon, Columba sjostedti
- São Tomé olive pigeon, Columba thomensis
- Comoro olive pigeon, Columba pollenii
- Speckled wood pigeon, Columba hodgsonii
- White-naped pigeon, Columba albinucha
- Ashy wood pigeon, Columba pulchricollis
- Nilgiri wood pigeon, Columba elphinstonii
- Sri Lanka wood pigeon, Columba torringtoniae
- Pale-capped pigeon, Columba punicea
- Silvery pigeon, Columba argentina – (thought to be extinct, rediscovered in 2008)
- Andaman wood pigeon, Columba palumboides
- Black wood pigeon or Japanese wood pigeon, Columba janthina
- † Bonin wood pigeon, Columba versicolor – extinct (c. 1890)
- † Ryukyu wood pigeon, Columba jouyi – extinct (late 1930s)
- Metallic pigeon or white-throated pigeon, Columba vitiensis
- White-headed pigeon, Columba leucomela
- Yellow-legged pigeon, Columba pallidiceps
- Eastern bronze-naped pigeon, Columba delegorguei
- Western bronze-naped pigeon, Columba iriditorques
- Island bronze-naped pigeon, Columba malherbii

A fossil species, C. omnisanctorum, was described from the Early Pliocene (5.3-3.6 Ma) of the Gargano Peninsula and surroundings, Italy. A supposed "falcon" fossil from nearby contemporary and Middle Pliocene (3.6-2.6 Ma) sites may either be of the same species or another pigeon; the name Columba pisana would apply for it or (if conspecific) for both. C. melitensis is a fossil pigeon from the Late Pleistocene of Malta. Only known from a coracoid described by Richard Lydekker in 1891, whether it is indeed distinct from the living species and not just a paleosubspecies needs to be studied, given its late age. Indeterminate remains of a Columba were also found in Late Pliocene/Early Pleistocene (ELMMZ MN 17) deposits at Varshets (Bulgaria) and Šandalja (Croatia).

Another prehistoric pigeon, C. congi, was described from Early Pleistocene remains found in the famous Zhoukoudian caves in China. This, too, needs to be studied regarding whether it is not just an ancestral population of a still-living species. An extinct pigeon, the Mauritian wood pigeon (Columba thiriouxi), was described in 2011. The validity of the species has been challenged and it is not generally recognised. The holotype is a right tarsometatarsus collected in 1910.

== Sources ==
- Mlíkovský, Jirí (2002): Cenozoic Birds of the World, Part 1: Europe. Ninox Press, Prague. ISBN 80-901105-3-8 PDF fulltext
