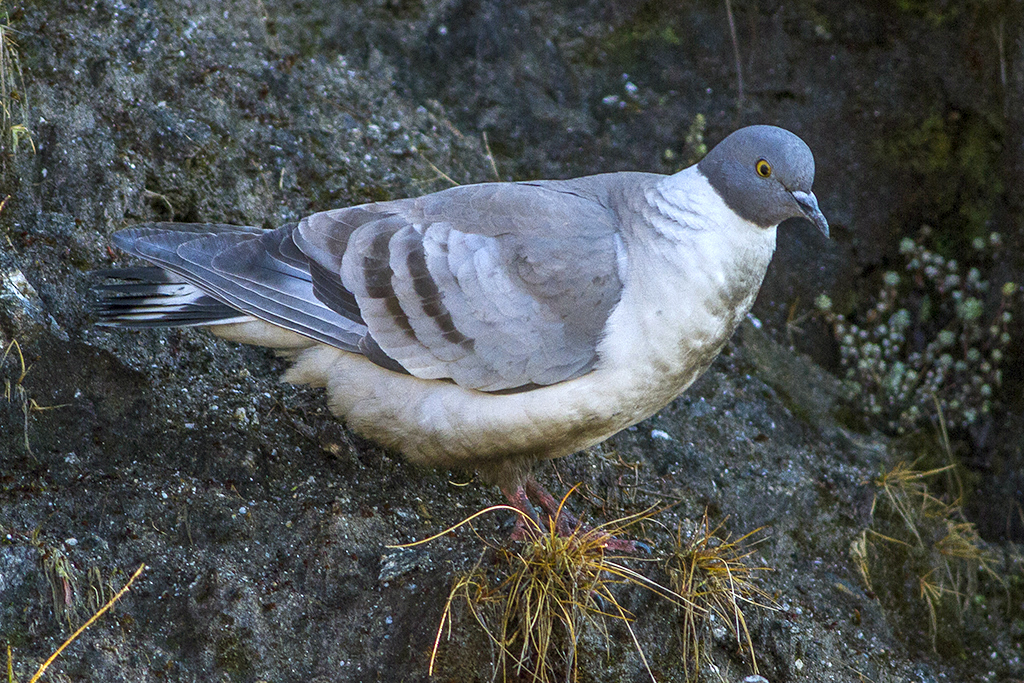
- Snow pigeon from Sikkim, India.

Conservation status
- Least Concern (IUCN 3.1)

Scientific classification
- Kingdom: Animalia
- Phylum: Chordata
- Class: Aves
- Order: Columbiformes
- Family: Columbidae
- Genus: Columba
- Species: C. leuconota

Binomial name
- Columba leuconota Vigors, 1831

= Snow pigeon =

Species of bird native to central Asia

The snow pigeon (Columba leuconota) is a species of bird in the genus Columba in the family Columbidae from hilly regions of central Asia. They are grey, black, pale brown and white birds and two subspecies are recognised: C. l. leuconota occurs in the western Himalayas from western Afghanistan to Sikkim and C. l. gradaria occurs in the mountains of eastern Tibet and from eastern Nan Shan (Qinghai) to Yunnan and extreme northern Myanmar. The birds forage in open country in pairs or small groups, feeding on grain, buds, shoots, berries and seeds. They roost at night on cliffs, breeding in crevices where they build untidy stick nests and lay a clutch of usually two white eggs. The International Union for Conservation of Nature has rated the bird's conservation status as being of least concern.

== Description ==
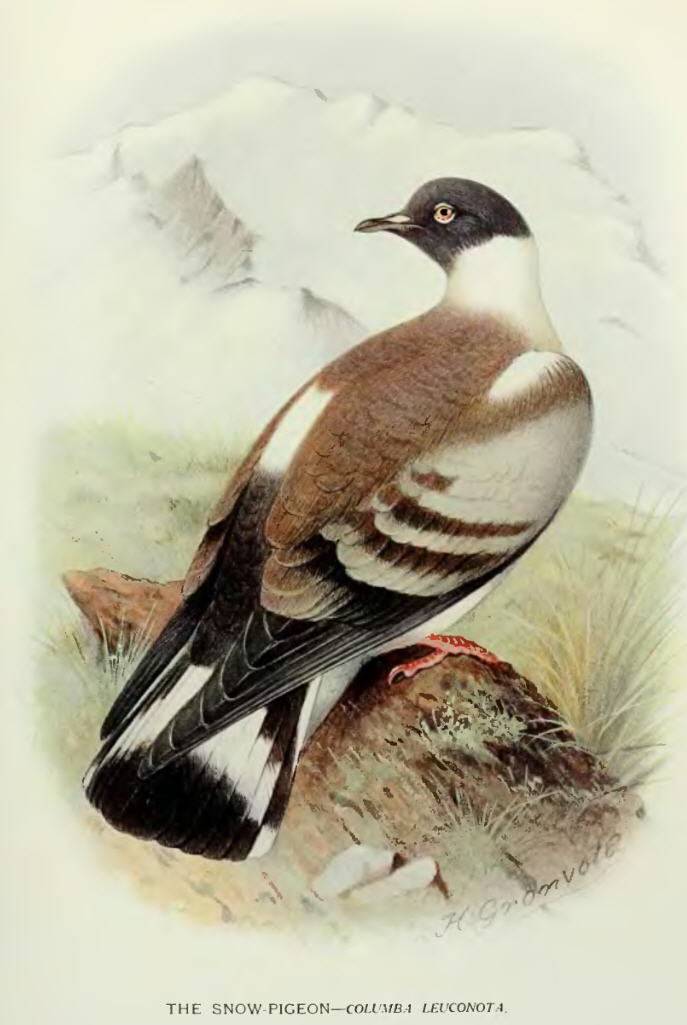

Snow pigeons have a blackish head contrasting with a white neck collar and white underparts shading into ashy on the abdomen. Their backs are brownish-grey with a white patch on the lower back. Their wings are pale grey with three brown bands. Their black tails have a clear white band in the middle which narrows and curve forward to reach the tip of the outermost tail features. Young birds have narrow, pale buff margins to the feathers of the upper parts and wings. The white of the underparts is sullied with buff.

== Taxonomy and systematics ==
Two subspecies are recognized:

- C. l. gradaria, described by Hartert in 1916, is found in the mountains of eastern Tibet and from eastern Nan Shan (Qinghai) to Yunnan and extreme northern Myanmar.
- Nepalese snow pigeon (C. l. leuconota), described by Vigors in 1831, is found in the western Himalayas from western Afghanistan to Sikkim; it is a summer visitor to the Alay Mountains and Pamir.

== Distribution and status ==
They are resident birds in rocky hills of Afghanistan, Bhutan, China, India, Kazakhstan, Myanmar, Nepal, Pakistan, Tajikistan, and Turkmenistan. It is a common bird and has an extremely large range. The population is believed to be stable and for these reasons, the International Union for Conservation of Nature has assessed its conservation status as being of least concern.

== Behaviour and ecology ==
They frequent rocky hill sides and sequestered valleys, seen up to the snow line. They frequently feed in the fields during the day, but roost in the cliffs. They are generally shy and wary. Gatherings of 150 or more occur in winter, often in the company of hill pigeons and in some areas with rock doves also.

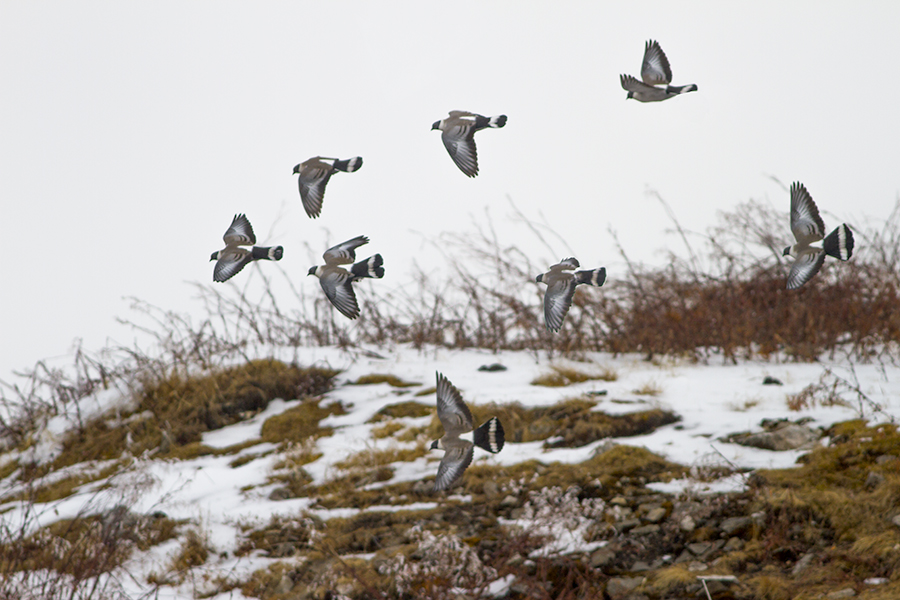
A flock of snow pigeons flying over 12,000 ft at Pangolakha Wildlife Sanctuary in Sikkim, India

In the summer, they descend to lower heights and are found in pairs or small flocks. They breed in colonies. The nests are placed in crevices or caves in the face of cliffs or ledges of rock. Their nests are untidy interlaced structures made of sticks, grass, straw, feathers, etc. The nests are generally reused every year with minor repairing. Generally, two eggs are laid.

They feed on berries, grain, buds, bulbs, seeds, and shoots.

== Status ==
It is a common and widely distributed species, and the population is believed to be stable. For these reasons, the International Union for Conservation of Nature has assessed its conservation status as "Least Concern".
