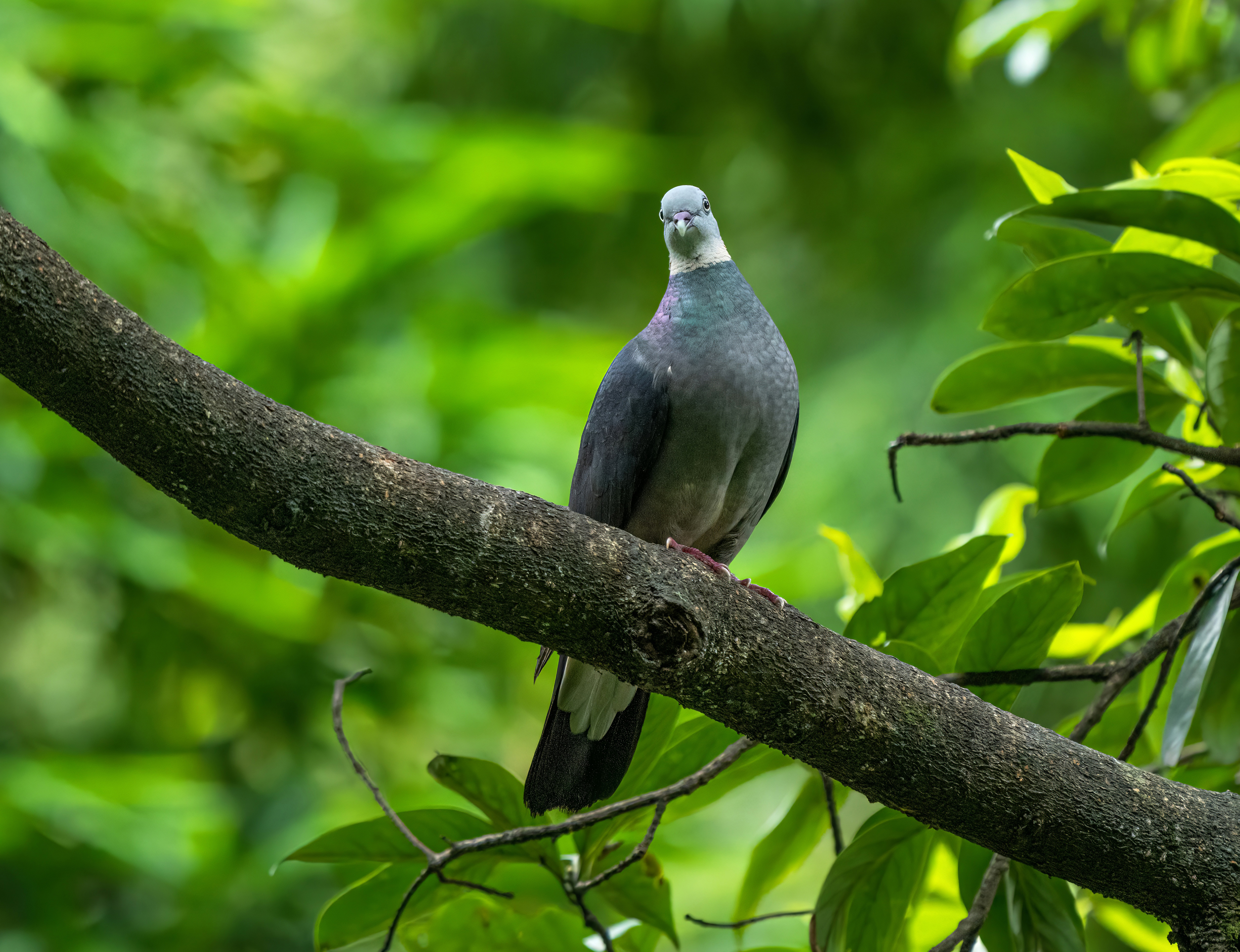
- At Phulchoki forest, Lalitpur, Nepal.

Conservation status
- Least Concern (IUCN 3.1)

Scientific classification
- Kingdom: Animalia
- Phylum: Chordata
- Class: Aves
- Order: Columbiformes
- Family: Columbidae
- Genus: Columba
- Species: C. pulchricollis

Binomial name
- Columba pulchricollis Blyth, 1846

= Ashy wood pigeon =

Species of bird

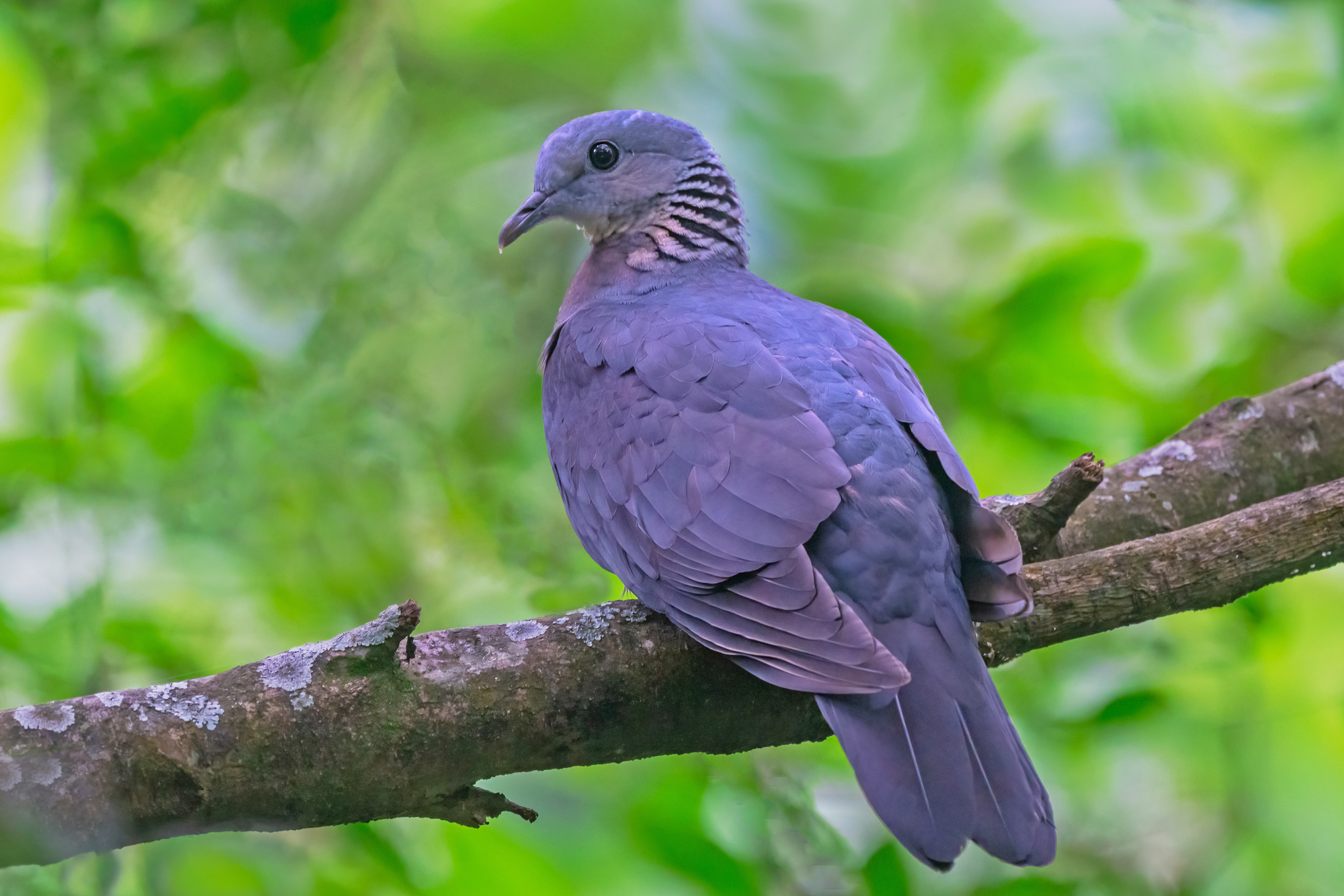
Ashy wood Pigeon, Khonoma, Nagaland

The ashy wood pigeon (Columba pulchricollis) is a member of the bird family Columbidae, found in temperate forests of southeastern Asia.

== Distribution ==
The ashy wood pigeon has a wide range throughout Southeast Asia, able to be found in Nepal, Bhutan, northern India, southern Tibet, southern China, northern Laos, northern to mid Myanmar, northern Thailand, and Taiwan. While the world population is unknown, the Taiwan population is estimated to be anywhere from 10,000 to 100,000 breeding pairs.

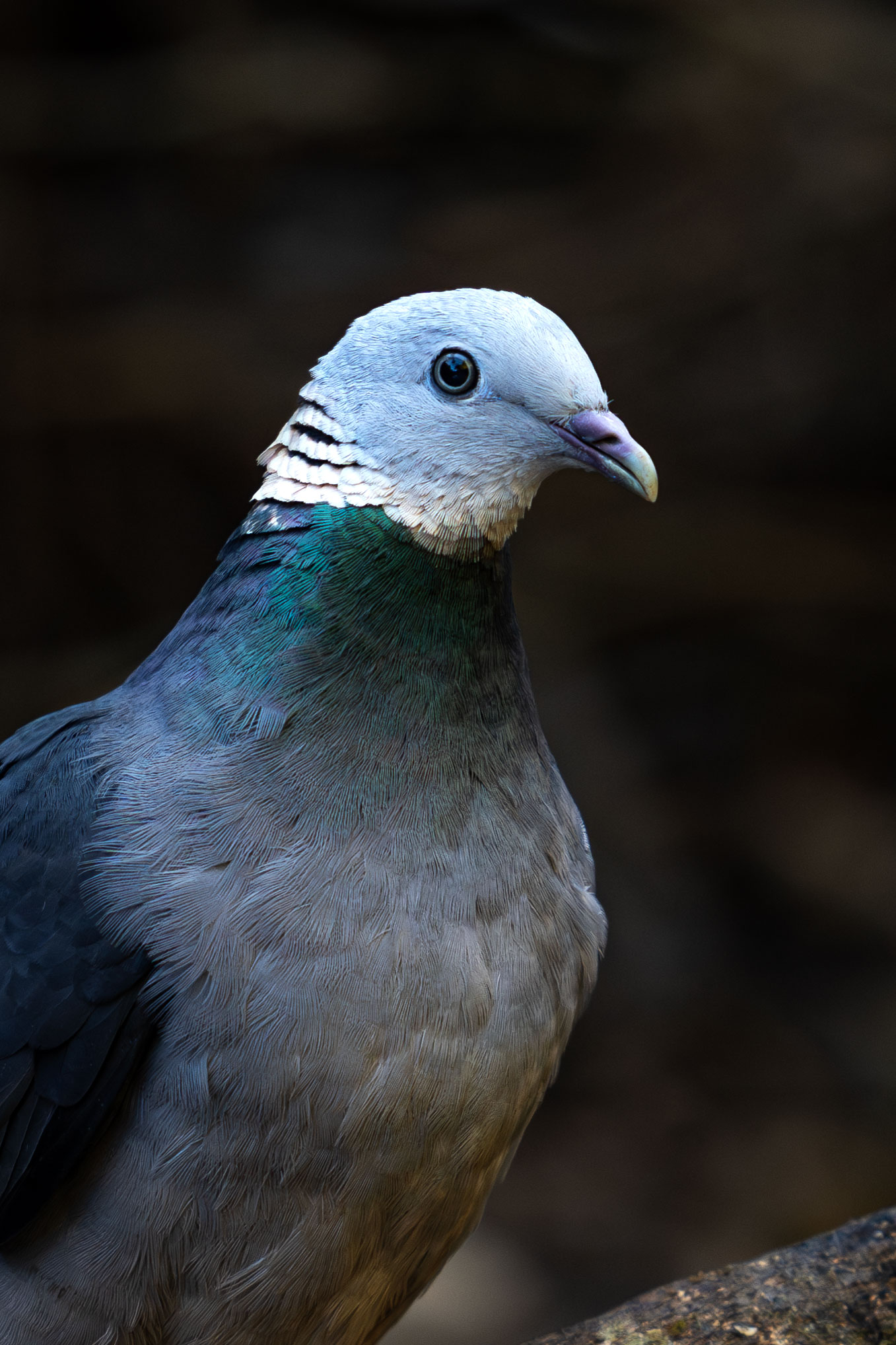
At Phulchoki, Nepal.

== Nesting ==
Clutches usually consist of one single white egg, although double egg clutches have been recorded. This pigeon incubates its eggs for approximately 21–23 days. Young birds fledge at about 28 days from being hatched.
