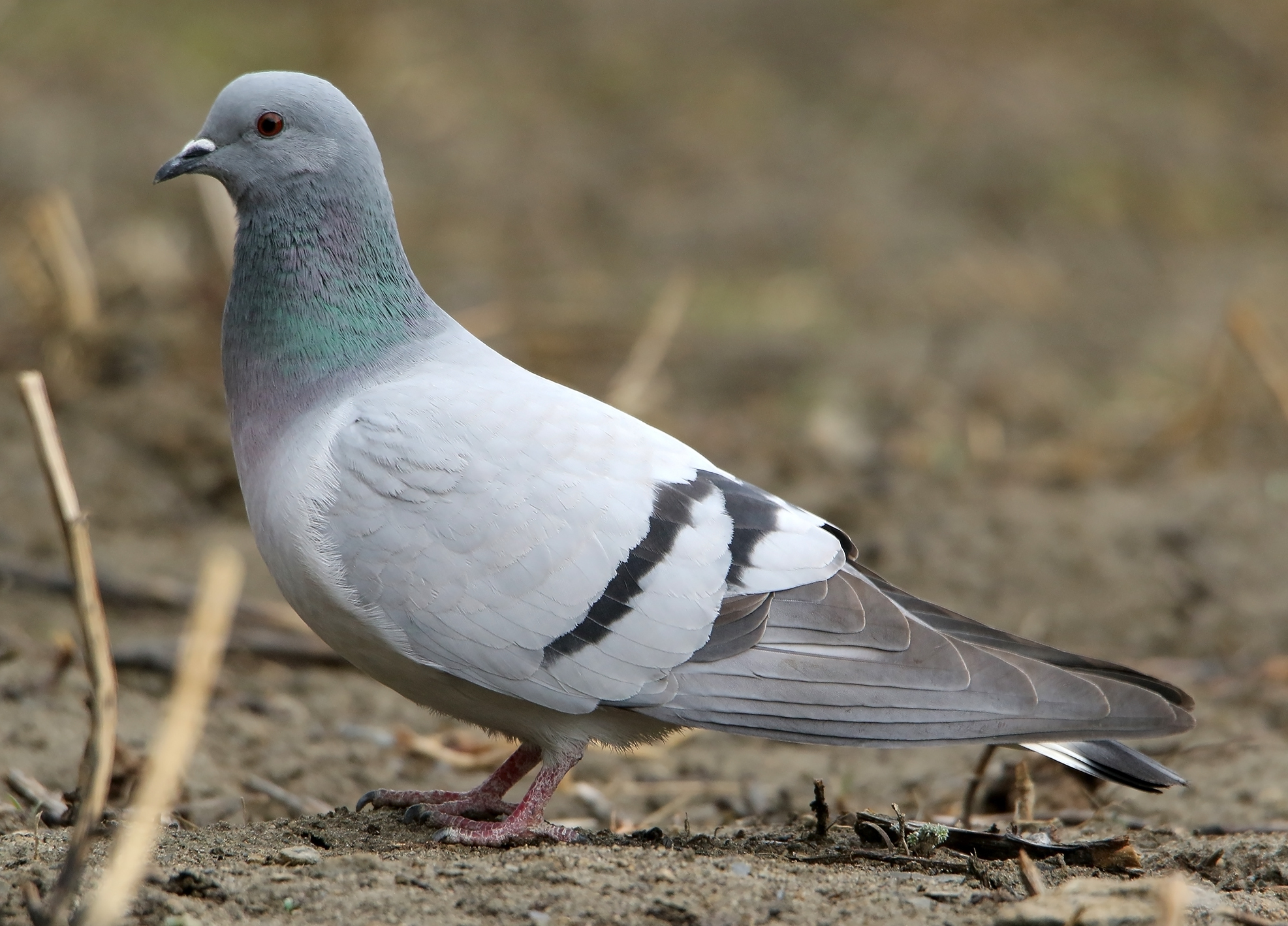
- A hill pigeon (Columba rupestris) captured in Borit, Gojal, Gilgit-Baltistan, Pakistan.

Conservation status
- Least Concern (IUCN 3.1)

Scientific classification
- Kingdom: Animalia
- Phylum: Chordata
- Class: Aves
- Order: Columbiformes
- Family: Columbidae
- Genus: Columba
- Species: C. rupestris

Binomial name
- Columba rupestris Pallas, 1811

Synonyms
- Columba oenas δ rupestris (protonym)

= Hill pigeon =

Species of bird

The hill pigeon (Columba rupestris) is a species of bird in the family Columbidae. Other names include eastern rock dove and Turkestan hill dove.

== Description ==
The hill pigeon is a stout-bodied pigeon, similar in size and general appearance to the rock dove (Columba livia) but mainly differentiated by its tail pattern which consists of a broad, white tail-band across the black tail. Other differences include a paler mantle and upper wings and a white patch on the back. In flight, the tail pattern is similar to the snow pigeon (Columba leuconota), but lacks the contrast between the head and neck in that species.

== Taxonomy and systematics ==
Two subspecies are accepted:

- C. r. rupestris, described by Pallas in 1811, is found in the northeastern part of the species' distribution.
- C. r. turkestanica, described by Buturlin in 1908, is found in the southwestern part of the species' distribution.

== Distribution and status ==
It is found in China, Pakistan, India, Nepal, Kazakhstan, North Korea, South Korea, Mongolia, Russia, Tajikistan, Afghanistan, and Turkmenistan. This pigeon is comparatively restricted in range of Pakistan to the furthest northern inner valleys of the Karakoram, Hindu Kush, and Pamirs. In Pakistan, it occurs in northern Chitral, particularly in the western part bordering Nuristan in Afghanistan, further east in valleys of Gilgit in Yasin and Hunza and Karakoram ranges in Baltistan from about 2000 m in winter, and up to 5500 m during summer. Though the overall population is decreasing, the rate of decrease is not alarming and the bird is widely distributed and abundant; it is classified as least concern by the IUCN.

== Behaviour and ecology ==
This species frequents open rugged country from 1,500 to 6,100 m above sea level. It is closely related to the rock dove, but is more commonly found at higher altitudes. A gregarious species throughout the year, they feed in flocks in the terraced, cultivated fields. They often mix with flocks of rock doves. They are very tame and are often found near human settlements, camps, and pilgrimage routes.

In Tajikistan, it has been recorded as starting to nest as early as February, with young from later broods fledging as late as September in northeastern Tibet. The males have a bowing display similar to that of the rock dove and display and courtship is similar. They nest in dense colonies on cliffs, gorges, and rocky outcrops. In Tibet, the nests are often placed in houses, both inhabited and empty, or in holes in the wall. Nests consist of a platform of twigs or plant stems in which generally two eggs are laid. They may raise two brood in a year.

Their feeding habits are similar to rock doves, being mainly granivorous, supplementing their diet with green shoot and leaves and occasionally small mollusks such as snails. On some occasions, they become very opportunistic, feeding on leftover food, partially digested food from kiang dung, and even undigested food from stomach of kiang carcasses which are ripped open by other predators.
