= List of woods =

This is a list of woods, most commonly used in the timber and lumber trade.

== Soft woods (coniferous) ==
- Araucaria
  - Hoop pine (Araucaria cunninghamii)
  - Monkey puzzle tree (Araucaria araucana)
  - Paraná pine (Araucaria angustifolia)
- Cedar (Cedrus)
- Celery-top pine (Phyllocladus aspleniifolius)
- Cypress (Chamaecyparis, Cupressus, Taxodium)
  - Arizona cypress (Cupressus arizonica)
  - Bald cypress, southern cypress (Taxodium distichum)
  - Alerce (Fitzroya cupressoides)
  - Hinoki cypress (Chamaecyparis obtusa)
  - Lawson's cypress (Chamaecyparis lawsoniana)
  - Mediterranean cypress (Cupressus sempervirens)
- Douglas-fir (Pseudotsuga menziesii)
  - Coast Douglas-fir (Pseudotsuga menziesii var. menziesii)
  - Rocky Mountain Douglas-fir (Pseudotsuga menziesii var. glauca)
- European yew (Taxus baccata)
- Fir (Abies)
  - Balsam fir (Abies balsamea)
  - Silver fir (Abies alba)
  - Noble fir (Abies procera)
  - Pacific silver fir (Abies amabilis)
- Hemlock (Tsuga)
  - Eastern hemlock (Tsuga canadensis)
  - Mountain hemlock (Tsuga mertensiana)
  - Western hemlock (Tsuga heterophylla)
- Huon pine, Macquarie pine (Lagarostrobos franklinii)
- Kauri (New Zealand) (Agathis australis)
- Queensland kauri (Australia) (Agathis robusta)
- Japanese nutmeg-yew, kaya (Torreya nucifera)
- Larch (Larix)
  - European larch (Larix decidua)
  - Japanese larch (Larix kaempferi)
  - Tamarack (Larix laricina)
  - Western larch (Larix occidentalis)
- Pine (Pinus)
  - European black pine (Pinus nigra)
  - Jack pine (Pinus banksiana)
  - Lodgepole pine (Pinus contorta)
  - Monterey pine (Pinus radiata)
  - Ponderosa pine (Pinus ponderosa)
  - Red pine (North America) (Pinus resinosa)
  - Scots pine, red pine (UK) (Pinus sylvestris)
  - White pine
    - Eastern white pine (Pinus strobus)
    - Western white pine (Pinus monticola)
    - Sugar pine (Pinus lambertiana)
  - Southern yellow pine
    - Loblolly pine (Pinus taeda)
    - Longleaf pine (Pinus palustris)
    - Pitch pine (Pinus rigida)
    - Shortleaf pine (Pinus echinata)
- Red cedar
  - Eastern red cedar, (Juniperus virginiana)
  - Western red cedar (Thuja plicata)
- Coast redwood (Sequoia sempervirens)
- Rimu (Dacrydium cupressinum)
- Spruce (Picea)
  - Norway spruce (Picea abies)
  - Black spruce (Picea mariana)
  - Red spruce (Picea rubens)
  - Sitka spruce (Picea sitchensis)
  - White spruce (Picea glauca)
- Sugi (Cryptomeria japonica)
- White cedar
  - Northern white cedar (Thuja occidentalis)
  - Atlantic white cedar (Chamaecyparis thyoides)
- Nootka cypress (Cupressus nootkatensis)

== Hardwoods (angiosperms) ==
- Abachi (Triplochiton scleroxylon)
- Acacia (Acacia sp., Robinia pseudoacacia)
- African padauk (Pterocarpus soyauxii)
- Afzelia, doussi (Afzelia africana)
- Agba, tola (Gossweilerodendron balsamiferum)
- Alder (Alnus)
  - Black alder (Alnus glutinosa)
  - Red alder (Alnus rubra)
- Ash (Fraxinus)
  - Black ash (Fraxinus nigra)
  - Blue ash (Fraxinus quadrangulata)
  - Common ash (Fraxinus excelsior)
  - Green ash (Fraxinus pennsylvanica)
  - Oregon ash (Fraxinus latifolia)
  - Pumpkin ash (Fraxinus profunda)
  - White ash (Fraxinus americana)
- Aspen (Populus)
  - Bigtooth aspen (Populus gradidentata)
  - European aspen (Populus tremula)
  - Quaking aspen (Populus tremuloides)
- Australian red cedar (Toona ciliata)
- Ayan, movingui (Distemonanthus benthamianus)
- Balsa (Ochroma pyramidale)
- Basswood, linden
  - American basswood (Tilia americana)
  - White basswood (Tilia heterophylla)
- beech (Fagus)
  - European beech (Fagus sylvatica)
  - American beech (Fagus grandifolia)
- Birch (Betula)
  - American birches
    - Gray birch (Betula populifolia)
    - Black birch (Betula nigra)
    - Paper birch (Betula papyrifera)
    - Sweet birch (Betula lenta)
    - Yellow birch (Betula alleghaniensis)
  - European birches
    - Silver birch (Betula pendula)
    - Downy birch (Betula pubescens)
- Blackbean (Castanospermum australe)
- Blackwood
  - Australian blackwood (Acacia melanoxylon)
  - African blackwood, mpingo (Dalbergia melanoxylon)
- Bloodwood (Brosimum rubescens)
- Boxelder (Acer negundo)
- Boxwood, common box (Buxus sempervirens)
- Brazilian walnut (Ocotea porosa)
- Brazilwood (Caesalpinia echinata)
- Buckeye, Horse-chestnut (Aesculus)
  - Horse-chestnut (Aesculus hippocastanum)
  - Ohio buckeye (Aesculus glabra)
  - Yellow buckeye (Aesculus flava)
- Butternut (Juglans cinerea)
- California bay laurel (Umbellularia californica)
- Camphor tree (Cinnamomum camphora)
- Cape chestnut (Calodendrum capense)
- Catalpa, catawba (Catalpa)
- Ceylon satinwood (Chloroxylon swietenia)
- Cherry (Prunus)
  - Black cherry (Prunus serotina)
  - Red cherry (Prunus pensylvanica)
  - Wild cherry (Prunus avium)
- Chestnut (Castanea spp.)
  - Chestnut (Castanea sativa)
  - American Chestnut (Castanea dentata)
- Coachwood (Ceratopetalum apetalum)
- Cocobolo (Dalbergia retusa)
- Corkwood (Leitneria floridana)
- Cottonwood, poplar
  - Eastern cottonwood (Populus deltoides)
  - Swamp cottonwood (Populus heterophylla)
- Cucumbertree (Magnolia acuminata)
- Cumaru (Dipteryx spp.)
- Dogwood (Cornus spp.)
  - Flowering dogwood (Cornus florida)
  - Pacific dogwood (Cornus nuttallii)
- Ebony (Diospyros)
  - Andaman marblewood (Diospyros kurzii)
  - Ebène marbre (Diospyros melanida)
  - African ebony (Diospyros crassiflora)
  - Ceylon ebony (Diospyros ebenum)
  - Rare Brown (Rareay Brownibium)
- Elm
  - American elm (Ulmus americana)
  - English elm (Ulmus procera)
  - Rock elm (Ulmus thomasii)
  - Slippery elm, red elm (Ulmus rubra)
  - Wych elm (Ulmus glabra)
- Eucalyptus
  - Flooded gum (Eucalyptus grandis) (Trade name Lyptus)
  - White mahogany (Eucalyptus acmenoides)
  - Brown mallet (Eucalyptus astringens)
  - Banglay, southern mahogany (Eucalyptus botryoides)
  - River red gum (Eucalyptus camaldulensis)
  - Karri (Eucalyptus diversicolor)
  - Blue gum (Eucalyptus globulus)
  - Flooded gum, rose gum (Eucalyptus grandis)
  - York gum (Eucalyptus loxophleba)
  - Jarrah (Eucalyptus marginata)
  - Tallowwood (Eucalyptus microcorys)
  - Grey ironbark (Eucalyptus paniculata)
  - Blackbutt (Eucalyptus pilularis)
  - Mountain ash (Eucalyptus regnans)
  - Australian oak (Eucalyptus obliqua)
  - Alpine ash (Eucalyptus delegatensis)
  - Red mahogany (Eucalyptus resinifera)
  - Swamp mahogany, swamp messmate (Eucalyptus robusta)
  - Sydney blue gum (Eucalyptus saligna)
  - Mugga, red ironbark (Eucalyptus sideroxylon)
  - Redwood (Eucalyptus transcontinentalis)
  - Wandoo (Eucalyptus wandoo)
- European crabapple (Malus sylvestris)
- European pear (Pyrus communis)
- Gonçalo alves (Astronium spp.)
- Greenheart (Chlorocardium rodiei)
- Grenadilla, mpingo (Dalbergia melanoxylon)
- Guanandi (Calophyllum brasiliense)
- Gum (Eucalyptus)
- Gumbo limbo (Bursera simaruba)
- Hackberry (Celtis occidentalis)
- Hickory (Carya)
  - Pecan (Carya illinoinensis)
  - Pignut hickory (Carya glabra)
  - Shagbark hickory (Carya ovata)
  - Shellbark hickory (Carya laciniosa)
- Hornbeam (Carpinus spp.)
  - American hophornbeam (Ostrya virginiana)
- Ipê (Handroanthus spp.)
- Iroko, African teak (Milicia excelsa)
- Ironwood
  - Balau (Shorea spp.)
  - American hornbeam (Carpinus caroliniana)
  - Sheoak, Polynesian ironwood (Casuarina equisetifolia)
  - Giant ironwood (Choricarpia subargentea)
  - Diesel tree (Copaifera langsdorffii)
  - Borneo ironwood (Eusideroxylon zwageri)
  - Lignum vitae
    - Guaiacwood (Guaiacum officinale)
    - Holywood (Guaiacum sanctum)
  - Takian (Hopea odorata)
  - Black ironwood (Krugiodendron ferreum)
  - Black ironwood, olive (Olea spp.)
  - Lebombo ironwood Androstachys johnsonii
  - Catalina ironwood (Lyonothamnus floribundus)
  - Ceylon ironwood (Mesua ferrea)
  - Desert ironwood (Olneya tesota)
  - Persian ironwood (Parrotia persica)
  - Brazilian ironwood, pau ferro (Caesalpinia ferrea)
  - Yellow lapacho (Tabebuia serratifolia)
- Jacarandá-boca-de-sapo (Jacaranda brasiliana)
- Jacarandá de Brasil (Dalbergia nigra)
- Jatobá (Hymenaea courbaril)
- Kingwood (Dalbergia cearensis)
- Lacewood
  - Northern silky oak (Cardwellia sublimis)
  - American sycamore (Platanus occidentalis)
  - London plane (Platanus × hispanica)
- Limba (Terminalia superba)
- Locust
  - Black locust (Robinia pseudoacacia)
  - Honey locust (Gleditsia triacanthos)
- Mahogany
  - Genuine mahogany (Swietenia)
    - West Indies mahogany (Swietenia mahagoni)
    - Bigleaf mahogany (Swietenia macrophylla)
    - Pacific Coast mahogany (Swietenia humilis)
  - other mahogany
    - African mahogany (Khaya spp.)
    - Chinese mahogany (Toona sinensis)
    - Australian red cedar, Indian mahogany (Toona ciliata)
    - Philippine mahogany, calantis, kalantis (Toona calantas)
    - Indonesian mahogany, suren (Toona sureni)
    - Sapele (Entandrophragma cylindricum)
    - Sipo, utile (Entandrophragma utile)
    - Tiama, (Entandrophragma angolense)
    - Kosipo, (Entandrophragma candollei)
    - Mountain mahogany, bottle tree (Entandrophragma caudatumi)
    - Indian mahogany, chickrassy, chittagong wood (Chukrasia velutina)
    - Spanish Cedar, cedro, Brazilian mahogany (Cedrela odorata)
    - Light bosse, pink mahogany (Guarea cedrata)
    - Dark bosse, pink Mahogany (Guarea thompsonii)
    - American muskwood (Guarea grandifolia)
    - Carapa, royal mahogany, demerara mahogany, bastard mahogany, andiroba, crabwood (Carapa guianensis)
    - Bead-tree, white cedar, Persian lilac (Melia azedarach)
- Maple (Acer)
  - Hard maple
    - Sugar maple (Acer saccharum)
    - Black maple (Acer nigrum)
  - Soft maple
    - Boxelder (Acer negundo)
    - Red maple (Acer rubrum)
    - Silver maple (Acer saccharinum)
  - European maple
    - Sycamore maple (Acer pseudoplatanus)
- Marblewood (Marmaroxylon racemosum)
- Marri, red gum (Corymbia calophylla)
- Meranti (Shorea spp.)
- Merbau, ipil (Intsia bijuga), Kwila
- Mesquite
  - White mesquite (Prosopis alba)
  - Chilean mesquite (Prosopis chilensis)
  - Honey mesquite (Prosopis glandulosa)
  - Black mesquite (Prosopis nigra)
  - Screwbean mesquite (Prosopis pubescens)
  - Velvet mesquite (Prosopis velutina)
- Mopane (Colophospermum mopane)
- Oak (Quercus)
  - White oak
    - White oak (Quercus alba)
    - Bur oak (Quercus macrocarpa)
    - Post oak (Quercus stellata)
    - Swamp white oak (Quercus bicolor)
    - Southern live oak (Quercus virginiana)
    - Swamp chestnut oak (Quercus michauxii)
    - Chestnut oak (Quercus prinus)
    - Chinkapin oak (Quercus muhlenbergii)
    - Canyon live oak (Quercus chrysolepis)
    - Overcup oak (Quercus lyrata)
  - English oak (Quercus robur)
  - Red oak
    - Northern red oak (Quercus rubra)
    - Eastern black oak (Quercus velutina)
    - Laurel oak (Quercus laurifolia)
    - Southern red oak (Quercus falcata)
    - Water oak (Quercus nigra)
    - Willow oak (Quercus phellos)
    - Nuttall's oak (Quercus texana)
- Okoumé (Aucoumea klaineana)
- Olive (Olea europaea)
- Pearl tree (Poliothyrsis sinensis)
- Pink ivory (Berchemia zeyheri)
- Poplar
  - Balsam poplar (Populus balsamifera)
  - Black poplar (Populus nigra)
  - Hybrid black poplar (Populus × canadensis)
- Purpleheart (Peltogyne spp.)
- Queensland maple (Flindersia brayleyana)
- Queensland walnut (Endiandra palmerstonii)
- Ramin (Gonystylus spp.)
- Redheart, chakté-coc (Erythroxylon mexicanum)
- Rubber wood
- Sal (Shorea robusta)
- Sweetgum (Liquidambar styraciflua)
- Sandalwood (Santalum spp.)
  - Indian sandalwood (Santalum album)
- Sassafras (Sassafras albidum)
  - Southern sassafras (Atherosperma moschatum)
- Satiné, satinwood (Brosimum rubescens)
- Silky oak (Grevillea robusta)
- Silver wattle (Acacia dealbata)
- Sourwood (Oxydendrum arboreum)
- Spanish-cedar (Cedrela odorata)
- Spanish elm (Cordia alliodora)
- Tamboti (Spirostachys africana)
- Tectona
- Teak (Tectona grandis)
  - Philippine teak (Tectona philippinensis)
- Thailand rosewood (Dalbergia cochinchinensis)
- Tupelo (Nyssa spp.)
  - Black tupelo (Nyssa sylvatica)
  - Tulip tree (Liriodendron tulipifera)
- Turpentine (Syncarpia glomulifera)
- Walnut (Juglans)
  - Eastern black walnut (Juglans nigra)
  - Common walnut (Juglans regia)
- Wenge (Millettia laurentii)
  - Panga-panga (Millettia stuhlmannii)
- Willow (Salix)
  - Black willow (Salix nigra)
  - Cricket-bat willow (Salix alba 'Caerulea')
  - White willow (Salix alba)
  - Weeping willow (Salix babylonica)
- Zingana, African zebrawood (Microberlinia brazzavillensis)

== Pseudowoods ==
Other wood-like materials:

- Bamboo
- Palm tree
  - Coconut timber (Cocos nucifera)
  - Toddy palm timber (Borassus flabellifer)
- Sudowoodo

== See also ==
- Janka hardness test
- List of Indian timber trees
- List of trees
