= Xanthopleura =

Scientific classification
- Kingdom: Animalia
- Phylum: Arthropoda
- Class: Insecta
- Order: Lepidoptera
- Superfamily: Noctuoidea
- Family: Erebidae
- Subfamily: Arctiinae
- Genus: Xanthopleura; Hampson, 1898

Genus of moths

Xanthopleura is a genus of moths in the subfamily Arctiinae.

== Species ==
- Xanthopleura flavocincta Guérin-Meneville, 1843
- Xanthopleura perspicua Walker, 1856

== Former species ==
- Xanthopleura trotschi Druce, 1884
