= Great pirogue of the Wagenia =

Dugout canoe from the Congo in the Royal Museum for Central Africa

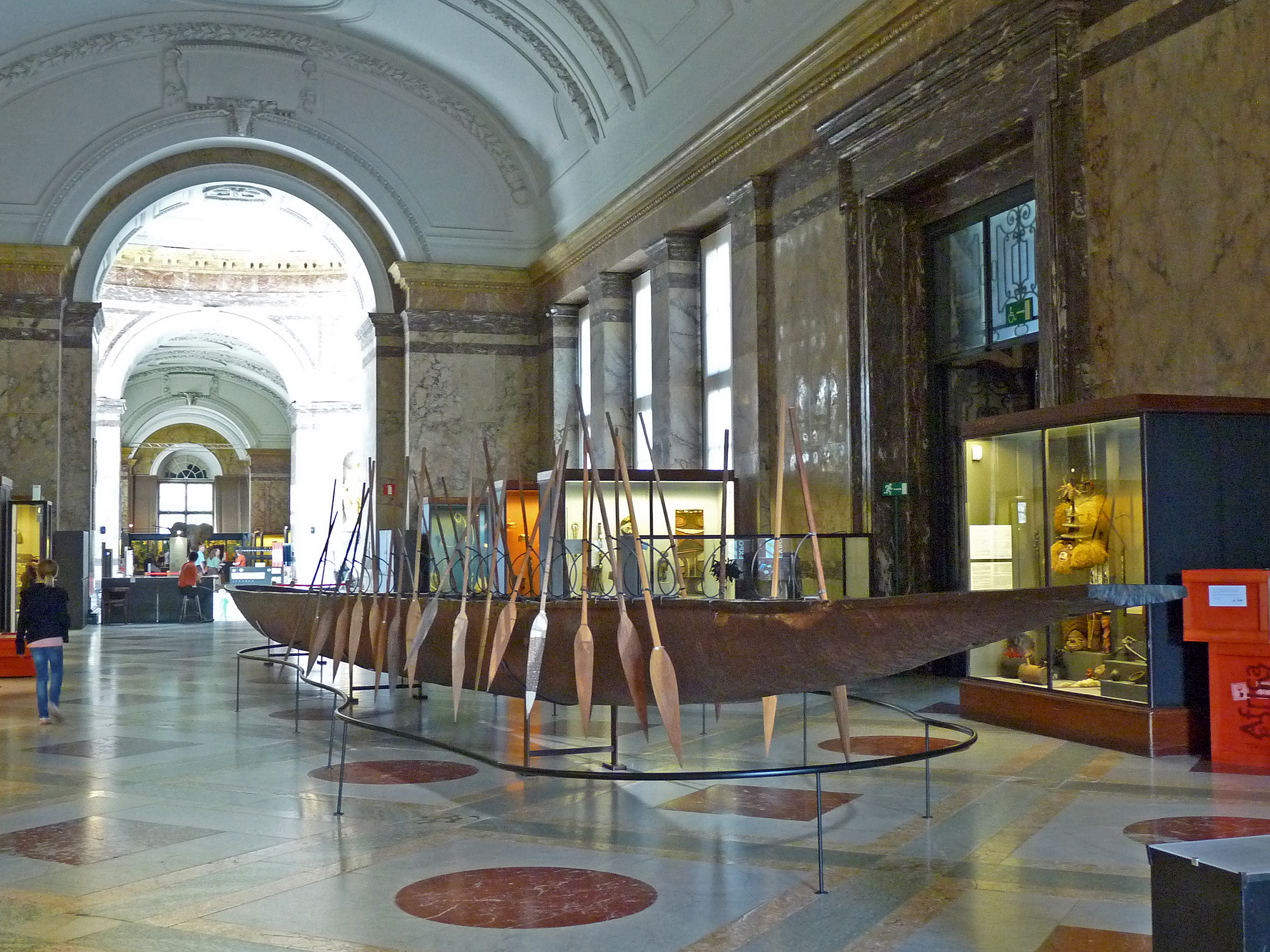
- The pirogue at the Royal Museum for Central Africa
- Material: Sipo wood (Entandrophragma utile)
- Size: about 22.5 m long, 3,500 kg
- Created: 1957
- Present location: Royal Museum for Central Africa, Tervuren, Belgium

The great pirogue of the Wagenia, also called the pirogue of King Leopold III, is a traditional dugout canoe almost 22 metres long. It was cut from a single trunk of sipo wood (Entandrophragma utile) and comes from the region of Ubundu in the Democratic Republic of the Congo. Since 1958 it has been displayed at the Royal Museum for Central Africa in Tervuren, Belgium.

The pirogue was built in 1957 in the village of Bamanga, in the Baleka chiefdom. It carried King Leopold III and his party on the Ruiki River during an official visit. With the help of the Belgian colonial authorities it reached the museum in January 1958, after negotiations led by its director, Frans Olbrechts.

== History ==
The pirogue comes from the region of Ponthierville, now Ubundu. It was built in 1957 and first used during the visit of the former Belgian king Leopold III in March 1957. After that journey, one of the two large pirogues used was sent to Belgium at the request of the museum. It arrived there on 3 January 1958.

== Acquisition by the museum ==
The pirogue was acquired after negotiations held in 1957 and 1958 between the local authorities of Ponthierville and Frans Olbrechts, then director of the museum. The request came from the territorial administration, which offered one of the two pirogues used for the royal visit. The pirogue was officially registered in the collection in January 1958.

It was sent to Belgium as a consignment from Carlo Van Elsen and was recorded in the collection as coming from Ponthierville. Whether the local people were genuinely free to negotiate the transfer is difficult to establish. The colonial setting makes such transactions complex, and they are sometimes contested today. Olbrechts died in March 1958, and much of the information about the pirogue and its acquisition was lost.

In 1997 Van Elsen himself corrected several errors in the museum's exhibition text. According to him the pirogue was one of two pirogues bought by the indigenous communities of the district for the two-day tour of part of the Ponthierville district by Leopold III and Princess Lilian. Those same communities gave the pirogue to the museum at the request of the assistant district commissioner, André Carpiaux.

Three men were involved in the acquisition. Carlo Van Elsen, assistant administrator of the Ponthierville district, made the negotiation with the museum possible. Frans Olbrechts, as director, led the discussions about sending the pirogue to Belgium. André Carpiaux, assistant district commissioner, made the original request.

Transport to Belgium required considerable planning because of the size of the pirogue. The archives indicate that it was shipped shortly after the royal visit of 1957, in circumstances that are not fully documented.

== Description ==
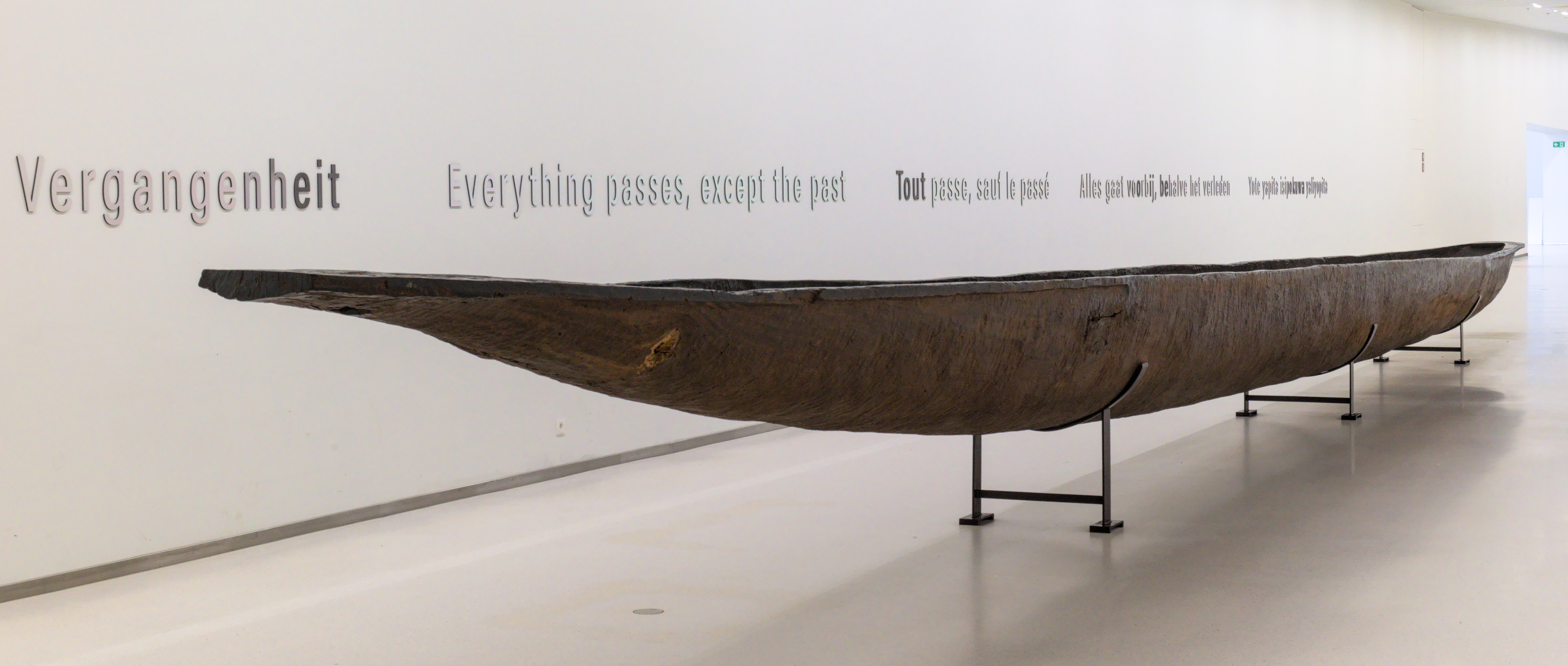
The pirogue in the museum's present display

The pirogue was hollowed out from a single tree trunk and is about 22.5 metres long. The wood is sipo (Entandrophragma utile), a durable species traditionally used in Central Africa for large boats. The craft reflects the knowledge of the river peoples, who used the forest resources around them to make such boats.

Detail of the hollowed hull

The pirogue weighs 3,500 kilograms and has two openings for outboard motors. It is large enough for 80 to 100 paddlers. It carried passengers on the rivers of the region and is typical of the collective river transport of the period.

== Paddles ==
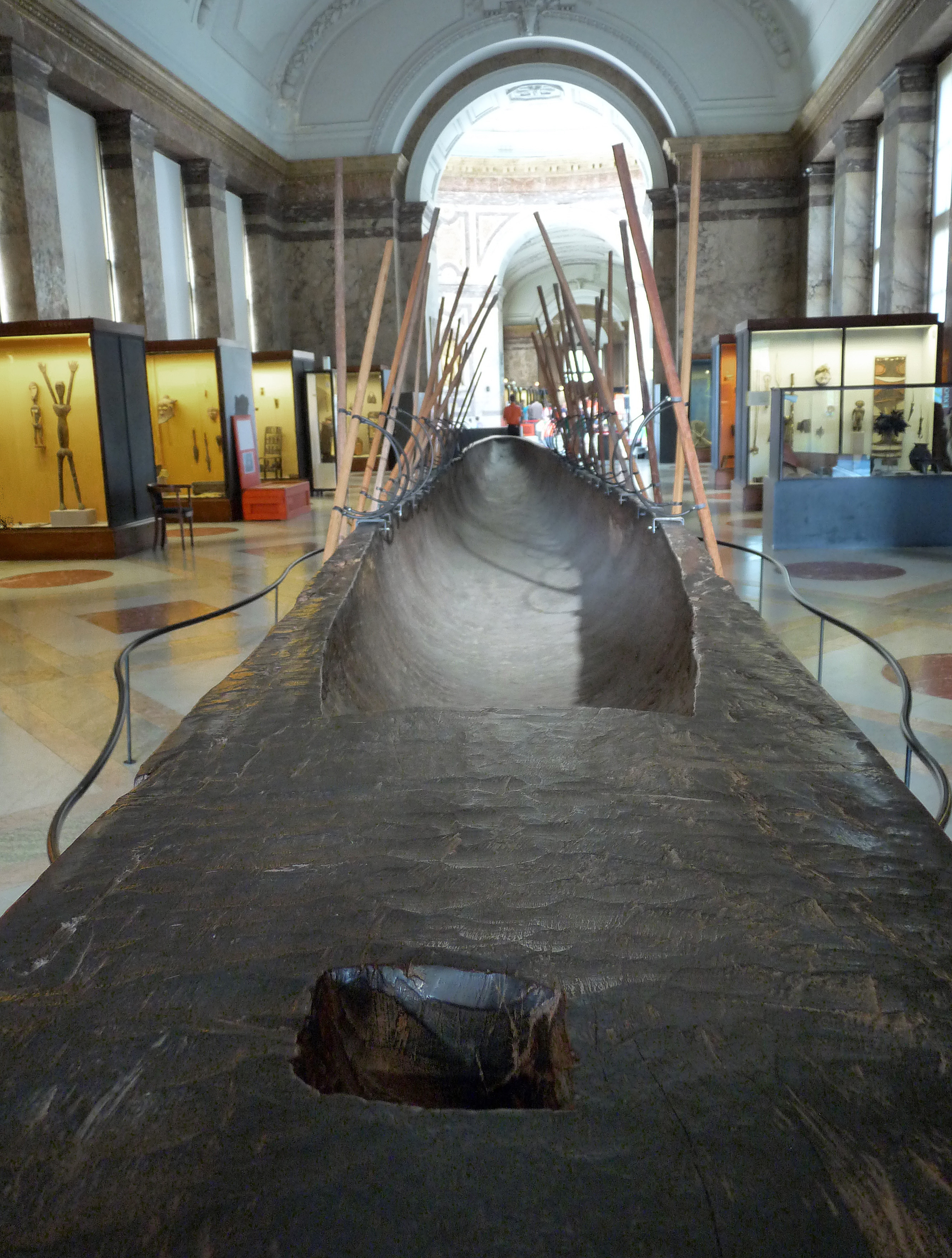
The pirogue with its paddles, in the museum's former display

Eighty paddles were ordered for the great pirogue. Some of them are decorated. Among the Wagenia and the people of Bamanga, pirogues were made under the supervision of local experts known as moeli. A finished pirogue was entrusted to the village head and used with paddles made specifically for it. The paddles were more than tools: they belonged to the identity of the pirogue, and some carried motifs or names from the village they came from.

== Display ==
The great pirogue is part of the museum's permanent display. It stands for the history of river navigation in Central Africa, and also for the complex colonial relationship between Belgium and the Congo.
