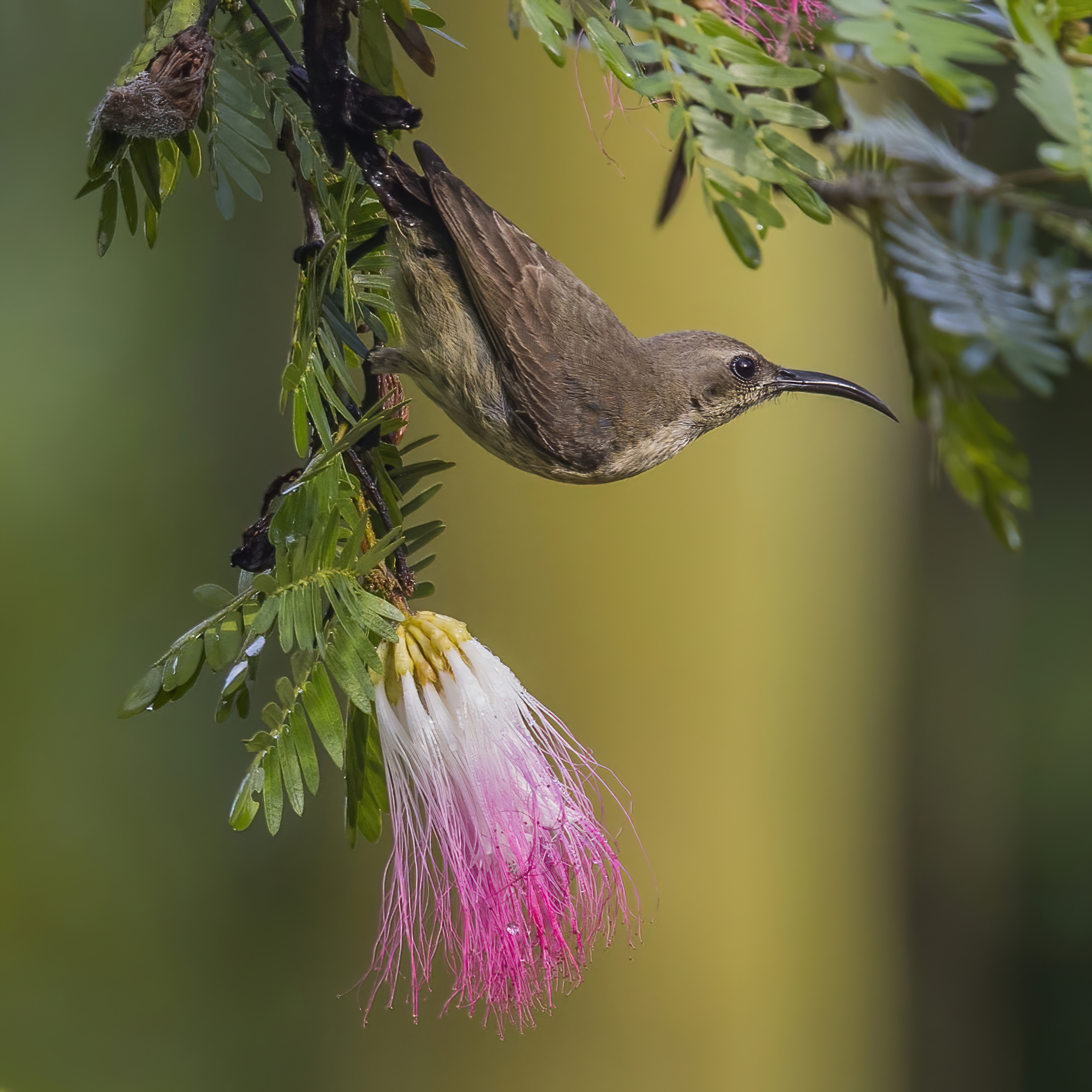
- Female
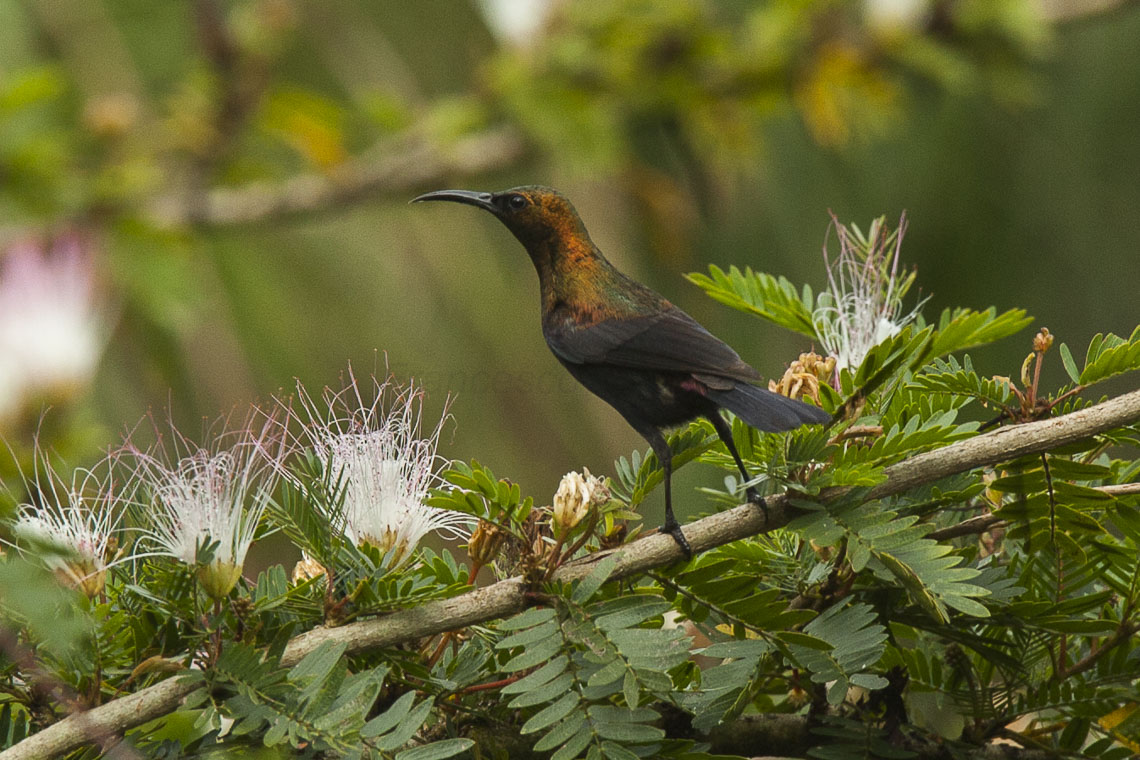
- Male

Conservation status
- Least Concern (IUCN 3.1)

Scientific classification
- Kingdom: Animalia
- Phylum: Chordata
- Class: Aves
- Order: Passeriformes
- Family: Nectariniidae
- Genus: Cinnyris
- Species: C. cupreus

Binomial name
- Cinnyris cupreus (Shaw, 1812)

Synonyms
- Nectarinia cuprea

= Copper sunbird =

Species of bird

The copper sunbird (Cinnyris cupreus) is a species of passerine bird in the family Nectariniidae. It is native to tropical Africa, its range extending from Senegal and Guinea in the west to South Sudan and Kenya in the east, and southwards to Angola, Zambia, Zimbabwe and Mozambique.

== Description ==
The adult male copper sunbird is about 12.5 cm (5 in) long. The subspecies C. c. cupreus inhabits the western part of its range and weighs about 7.5 to 11 g (0.26 to 0.39 oz). The male C. c. chalceus, from the eastern half, weighs 7.5 to 11 g (0.26 to 0.39 oz) while the female of both subspecies weighs 7.3 to 10.2 g (0.26 to 0.36 oz).

- C. c. cupreus: Senegal to east Democratic Republic of the Congo, Uganda, Ethiopia, west Kenya and west Tanzania
- C. c. chalceus: Angola to southeast Democratic Republic of the Congo, west Zambia, Malawi and Zimbabwe

== Distribution and habitat ==
It is found in Angola, Benin, Botswana, Burkina Faso, Burundi, Cameroon, Central African Republic, Chad, Republic of the Congo, Democratic Republic of the Congo, Ivory Coast, Ethiopia, Gabon, Gambia, Ghana, Guinea, Guinea-Bissau, Kenya, Liberia, Malawi, Mali, Mauritania, Mozambique, Namibia, Niger, Nigeria, Rwanda, Senegal, Sierra Leone, South Africa, Sudan, Tanzania, Togo, Uganda, Zambia, and Zimbabwe. It is a non-migratory bird and is resident across its range. Its habitat is mainly savannas, but also includes degraded forest, woodland, marshes, mangroves, coastal thickets and agricultural land.

== Ecology ==
The copper sunbird feeds on nectar that it sipps from selected flowers. Some of its favourite trees and plants include Calliandra spp., Leonotis leonurus, Syzygium spp., and Senegalia polyacantha. It also takes fruits, spiders and insects, some of which are caught on the wing.

== Status ==
The copper sunbird has a wide range and a large total population. It is a common bird and the International Union for Conservation of Nature has assessed its conservation status as being of "least concern".
