= Belemnia ochriplaga =

Scientific classification
- Kingdom: Animalia
- Phylum: Arthropoda
- Class: Insecta
- Order: Lepidoptera
- Superfamily: Noctuoidea
- Family: Erebidae
- Subfamily: Arctiinae
- Genus: Belemnia
- Species: B. ochriplaga

Binomial name
- Belemnia ochriplaga Hampson, 1901

Species of moth

Belemnia ochriplaga is a moth of the subfamily Arctiinae. It was described by George Hampson in 1901. It is found in Brazil.
