= List of Acacia species used for timber production =

This is a list of Acacia species (sensu lato) that are used for the production of timber.

Approximate wood densities of acacia species
Species	Density [kg/m³]	Heartwood density [kg/m³]	Sapwood density [kg/m³]
Acacia acuminata	1040		
Acacia amythethophylla		1170	
Acacia catechu	880		
Acacia confusa	690-750		
Acacia erioloba		1230	
Acacia galpinii		800	
Acacia goetzii			1025
Acacia karoo		800	
Acacia leucophloea	760		
Acacia melanoxylon	640		
Acacia mellifera subsp. mellifera		1100	
Acacia nilotica	700	1170	
Acacia nilotica subsp. adstringens	827-945		
Acacia nilotica subsp. nilotica	800	1170	
Acacia polyacantha subsp. campylacantha		705	
Acacia sieberiana		655	
