= Belemnia pavonia =

Scientific classification
- Kingdom: Animalia
- Phylum: Arthropoda
- Clade: Pancrustacea
- Class: Insecta
- Order: Lepidoptera
- Superfamily: Noctuoidea
- Family: Erebidae
- Subfamily: Arctiinae
- Genus: Belemnia
- Species: B. pavonia

Binomial name
- Belemnia pavonia Forbes, 1939

Species of moth

Belemnia pavonia is a moth of the subfamily Arctiinae. It was described by William Trowbridge Merrifield Forbes in 1939. It is found in Panama.
