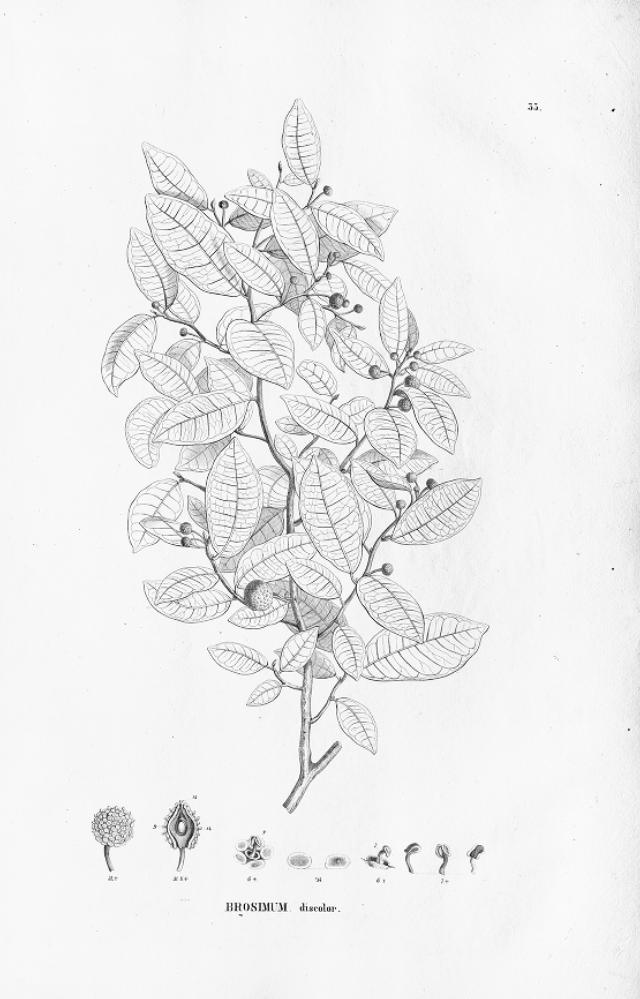
- Brosimum guianense parts drawing

Scientific classification
- Kingdom: Plantae
- Clade: Tracheophytes
- Clade: Angiosperms
- Clade: Eudicots
- Clade: Rosids
- Order: Rosales
- Family: Moraceae
- Tribe: Dorstenieae
- Genus: Brosimum; Sw. (1788)

Species
- 19, see text

Synonyms
- Alicastrum P.Browne (1756); Androstylanthus Ducke (1922); Brosimopsis S.Moore (1895); Ferolia Aubl. (1775), nom. rej.; Galactodendrum Kunth ex Humb. (1819); Helianthostylis Baill. (1875); Lanessania Baill. (1875); Piratinera Aubl. (1775); Trymatococcus Poepp. & Endl. (1838)

= Brosimum =

Genus of flowering plants

Brosimum is a genus of plants in the family Moraceae, native to tropical regions of the Americas.

The breadnut (B. alicastrum) was used by the Maya civilisation for its edible nut. The dense vividly coloured scarlet wood of B. rubescens is used for decorative woodworking. B. guianense, or snakewood, has a mottled snake-skin pattern, and is among the densest woods, with a very high stiffness; it was the wood of choice for making of bows for musical instruments of the violin family until the late 18th century, when it was replaced by the more easily worked brazilwood (Paubrasilia echinata). Plants of this genus are otherwise used for timber, building materials, and in a cultural context.

Bufotenin has been identified as a component in the latex of the takini (Brosimum acutifolium) tree, which is used as a psychedelic by South American shamans.

== Species ==
19 species are accepted.

- Brosimum acutifolium Huber – tamamuri
- Brosimum alicastrum Sw. – breadnut, Maya nut, ramón (Spanish)
- Brosimum amazonicum (Poepp. & Endl.) E.M.Gardner & Zerega
- Brosimum costaricanum Liebm.
- Brosimum gaudichaudii Trecul — Mama-cadela
- Brosimum glaucum Taub.
- Brosimum glaziovii Taub.
- Brosimum guianense (Aubl.) Huber ex Ducke – snakewood (= B. aubletii)
- Brosimum lactescens (S.Moore) C.C.Berg
- Brosimum longifolium Ducke
- Brosimum melanopotamicum C.C.Berg
- Brosimum multinervium C.C.Berg
- Brosimum parinarioides Ducke
  - Brosimum parinarioides ssp. amplicoma (Ducke) C.C.Berg (= B. amplicoma)
  - Brosimum parinarioides ssp. parinarioides
- Brosimum potabile Ducke
- Brosimum rubescens Taub. — satine bloodwood
- Brosimum sprucei (Baill.) E.M.Gardner & Zerega
- Brosimum steyermarkii (C.C.Berg) E.M.Gardner & Zerega
- Brosimum utile (Kunth) Oken (= B. galactodendron)

=== Formerly placed here ===
- Pseudolmedia spuria (Sw.) Griseb. (as B. spurium Sw.)
