= Belemnia eryx =

Scientific classification
- Domain: Eukaryota
- Kingdom: Animalia
- Phylum: Arthropoda
- Class: Insecta
- Order: Lepidoptera
- Superfamily: Noctuoidea
- Family: Erebidae
- Subfamily: Arctiinae
- Genus: Belemnia
- Species: B. eryx

Binomial name
- Belemnia eryx (Fabricius, 1775)

Synonyms
- Zygaena eryx Fabricius, 1775; Spinx inaurata Cramer, [1777] (preocc. Sulzer); Belemnia crameri Butler, 1875; Belemnia obscura Druce, 1899

Species of moth

Belemnia eryx is a moth of the subfamily Arctiinae. It was described by Johan Christian Fabricius in 1775. It is found in Venezuela, Bolivia, Argentina, Brazil, Colombia and Peru.
