= Belemnia aplaga =

Scientific classification
- Kingdom: Animalia
- Phylum: Arthropoda
- Class: Insecta
- Order: Lepidoptera
- Superfamily: Noctuoidea
- Family: Erebidae
- Subfamily: Arctiinae
- Genus: Belemnia
- Species: B. aplaga

Binomial name
- Belemnia aplaga Hampson, 1901

Species of moth

Belemnia aplaga is a moth of the subfamily Arctiinae. It was described by George Hampson in 1901. It is native to Ecuador.
