= Brosimum glaziovii =

Conservation status
- Least Concern (IUCN 3.1)

Scientific classification
- Kingdom: Plantae
- Clade: Tracheophytes
- Clade: Angiosperms
- Clade: Eudicots
- Clade: Rosids
- Order: Rosales
- Family: Moraceae
- Genus: Brosimum
- Species: B. glaziovii

Binomial name
- Brosimum glaziovii Taub.

Synonyms
- Alicastrum glaziovii Taub.

Species of flowering plant

Brosimum glaziovii is a species of flowering plant in the family Moraceae. It is a tree native to eastern and southern Brazil.

== Description ==
Brosimum glaziovii is endemic to Atlantic Forest habitats of eastern Brazil, from southeastern Bahia to Santa Catarina. It grows in rainforest and seasonally-dry semi-deciduous forest.

It is present in to the Serra do Mar, including Tijuca National Park

== Conservation ==
It is an IUCN Red List Least concern species. Its population trend is unknown, but it is not considered threatened.

It is on the official list of threatened Brazilian plants compiled by Brazilian Institute of Environment and Renewable Natural Resources—IBAMA.
