= Belemnia mygdon =

Scientific classification
- Domain: Eukaryota
- Kingdom: Animalia
- Phylum: Arthropoda
- Class: Insecta
- Order: Lepidoptera
- Superfamily: Noctuoidea
- Family: Erebidae
- Subfamily: Arctiinae
- Genus: Belemnia
- Species: B. mygdon

Binomial name
- Belemnia mygdon H. Druce, 1900

Species of moth

Belemnia mygdon is a moth of the subfamily Arctiinae. It was described by Herbert Druce in 1900. It is found in Colombia.

== Subspecies ==
- Belemnia mygdon mygdon
- Belemnia mygdon marthae Rothschild, 1909
