= Belemnia trotschi =

Scientific classification
- Domain: Eukaryota
- Kingdom: Animalia
- Phylum: Arthropoda
- Class: Insecta
- Order: Lepidoptera
- Superfamily: Noctuoidea
- Family: Erebidae
- Subfamily: Arctiinae
- Genus: Belemnia
- Species: B. trotschi

Binomial name
- Belemnia trotschi (H. Druce, 1884)

Synonyms
- Calonotos trotschi H. Druce, 1884; Xanthopleura trotschi

Species of moth

Belemnia trotschi is a moth of the subfamily Arctiinae first described by Herbert Druce in 1884. It is found in Panama and Costa Rica.

The larvae feed on Brosimum guianense.
