= Brosimum parinarioides =

Conservation status
- Least Concern (IUCN 3.1)

Scientific classification
- Kingdom: Plantae
- Clade: Tracheophytes
- Clade: Angiosperms
- Clade: Eudicots
- Clade: Rosids
- Order: Rosales
- Family: Moraceae
- Genus: Brosimum
- Species: B. parinarioides

Binomial name
- Brosimum parinarioides Ducke

Subspecies
- Brosimum parinarioides subsp. amplicoma (Ducke) C.C.Berg; Brosimum parinarioides subsp. parinarioides

Synonyms
- synonyms of subsp. amplicoma: Brosimum amplicoma Ducke; synonyms of subsp. parinarioides: Piratinera parinarioides Ducke

Species of flowering plant

Brosimum parinarioides, also called leite de amapá, is an evergreen tree which grows in the semi-arid to humid tropical lowlands in South America. It can reach a height of up to 32 m. It is native to northern Brazil, the Guianas, Colombia, Peru, and Bolivia.

== Uses ==
Brosimum parinarioides can be used in carbon farming, as it is a canopy tree in rainforests.

It is used for medicinal purposes, as an edible milk, and for its wild harvested nuts.

Brosimum parinarioides can be used as an adulterant of balata. (Balata is "a gum or latex made from tree sap and resembling rubber" which can be made into gaskets, chewing gum, or a gutta-percha substitute.)
