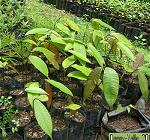

Conservation status
- Least Concern (IUCN 3.1)

Scientific classification
- Kingdom: Plantae
- Clade: Tracheophytes
- Clade: Angiosperms
- Clade: Eudicots
- Clade: Rosids
- Order: Rosales
- Family: Moraceae
- Genus: Brosimum
- Species: B. utile

Binomial name
- Brosimum utile (Kunth) Oken

Subspecies
- Brosimum utile subsp. allenii (Woodson) C.C.Berg; Brosimum utile subsp. darienense C.C.Berg; Brosimum utile subsp. magdalenense C.C.Berg; Brosimum utile subsp. occidentale C.C.Berg; Brosimum utile subsp. ovatifolium (Ducke) C.C.Berg; Brosimum utile subsp. utile

Synonyms
- Galactodendrum utile Kunth; Piratinera utilis (Kunth) Baill.; synonyms of subsp. allenii: Brosimum allenii Woodson; synonyms of subsp. ovatifolium: Brosimum krukovii Standl.; Brosimum ovatifolium Ducke; Brosimum pallescens Ducke; Brosimum rigidum Ducke; Piratinera ovatifolia Ducke, nom. altern.; Piratinera rigida Ducke; synonyms of subsp. utile: Brosimum galactodendron D.Don ex Sweet; Brosimum humboldtii Carruth.; Brosimum refractum Mart. ex Miq.

= Brosimum utile =

Species of flowering plant

Brosimum utile is a species of flowering plant in the family Moraceae. It is a tree native the tropical Americas, including Honduras, Costa Rica, and Panama in Central America, and northern South America to Bolivia and central Brazil.

== Description ==
Brosimum utile can grow to a height of 30m. It is monoecious and has bisexual inflorescences.

== Subspecies ==
Six subspecies are accepted:

- Brosimum utile subsp. allenii (Woodson) C.C.Berg – Costa Rica and Honduras
- Brosimum utile subsp. darienense C.C.Berg – Panama
- Brosimum utile subsp. magdalenense C.C.Berg – Colombia
- Brosimum utile subsp. occidentale C.C.Berg – Colombia and Ecuador
- Brosimum utile subsp. ovatifolium (Ducke) C.C.Berg – Bolivia, northern and west-central Brazil, Colombia, Ecuador, the Guianas, Peru, and Venezuela
- Brosimum utile subsp. utile – Colombia, Panama, and northern Venezuela

== History ==
In 1799, the renowned German polymath Alexander von Humboldt, accompanied by French botanist Aimé Bonpland, embarked on a five-year trip to South America. On one occasion, in January 1800, they traveled 130 miles, climbing the Silla de Caracas mountain near Caracas, Venezuela, passed through the valleys of Aragua and Tui, visited the mountains of Los Tequos, the hot springs of Mariare and Trinchera, and the northern shore of the lake of Valencia (by the town of Valencia, Venezuela), where they made the discovery of the cow-tree, so called from its yielding milk. They continued through New Valencia and over the mountain range of Higuerote to Puerto Cabello, 20 miles north of Valencia.

By February 1801 they had reached Havana, Cuba. Humboldt took the precaution of making two copies of their descriptions of plants, consisting of two volumes, and containing 1,400 specimens. One copy went to France to be retrieved for Bonpland and one to London through John Fraser to the German botanist Carl Ludwig Willdenow, Humboldt's friend and early instructor. Willdenow started work on the project, but his premature death required Humboldt to pass on this immense challenge to Carl Sigismund Kunth who completed the work. Bonpland never completed his assignments for this task.

The number of plants actually described during the five-year journey amounted to 4,528, and the descriptions filled six volumes three folios and three quartos. The localities of all these plants, as described in the 'Nova Genera et Species Plantarum in Peregrinatione ad Plagam Aequinoctialem Collectarum,' are denoted with the barometric determination of the height above the sea, a detail which has never before been introduced into any botanical work.

These volumes were employed by the celebrated German botanist Carl Sigismund Kunth, Director of the Botanic Gardens at Berlin, in editing at Paris the 'Nova Genera et Species.' As only about a fifth of these descriptions are from the pen of Alexander von Humboldt, the volumes on the death of Professor Kunth were sent by Humboldt, in acknowledgment of the indefatigable industry of his fellow traveller, to the Museum of Natural History at Paris, where they were preserved as the property of Bonpland.

Kunth first described the species as Galactodendrum utile in Nova Genera et Species 7: 136, published in 1824. It took 41 years from when Humboldt discovered this tree and wrote about it in letters from South America to friends in Europe (although known to the Native Americans), to when Kunth was able to compile and definitely publish this and other findings. In 1841 Lorenz Oken renamed the species Brosimum utile, which was published in: Allgemeine Naturgeschichte fur alle Stande. Register. 3(3): 1571 (1841).

Of interest was that as early as 1818, Humboldt's discovery was mentioned in a North American magazine. "American Monthly Magazine and Critical Review" (New York) 4 1818: 309 Cow tree. {Description is based on the reports of Humboldt and Franz Bredemeyer}

== Distribution and habitat ==
The range of Brosimum utile, a shade-tolerant species native to southern Central America and northern South America, extends from Brazil and Venezuela to Costa Rica, where it is numerous in the tropical wet forests of Piedras Blancas National Park. This climax-species dominates canopies on well-drained slopes, in addition to thriving in the mountain and upland forests of the Golfo Dulce region.

The tree can be found in the rainforest of Golfo Dulce Retreat, where typical features of this species may be observed, including buttresses from which Brosimum utile's classic white latex may be extracted. Brosimum utile is also cultivated in India, Sri Lanka and Indonesia.

== Cultivation ==
Propagation is from seed or from cuttings.

== Uses ==
The white latex of Brosimum utile is valued for its pharmacological properties and is historically used as a milk substitute by indigenous Central and South Americans. The milk, which contains 5 to 7% protein, can be used for cheese, ice cream, and other products. Taste varies between trees. Some brosmium utile trees have sweet latex, while others are bitter.

The latex of Brosimum utile yields a wax called galactin, which can be used in candles.

The fibrous bark can be used to make cloth, sails, or blankets.

The wood of Brosimum utile is sometimes called Sande and is used for plywood, particleboard, fiberboard, carpentry, light construction, furniture components, and moulding.

Carbon farming applications.

The leaves and branch tips can serve as cattle fodder. The edible nuts and fruits can be eaten boiled or salted, and can also be used for pig feed.
