= Belemnia lydia =

Scientific classification
- Domain: Eukaryota
- Kingdom: Animalia
- Phylum: Arthropoda
- Class: Insecta
- Order: Lepidoptera
- Superfamily: Noctuoidea
- Family: Erebidae
- Subfamily: Arctiinae
- Genus: Belemnia
- Species: B. lydia

Binomial name
- Belemnia lydia H. Druce, 1896

Species of moth

Belemnia lydia is a moth of the subfamily Arctiinae. It was described by Herbert Druce in 1896. It is found in Colombia.
