= Xanthopleura flavocincta =

Scientific classification
- Kingdom: Animalia
- Phylum: Arthropoda
- Clade: Pancrustacea
- Class: Insecta
- Order: Lepidoptera
- Superfamily: Noctuoidea
- Family: Erebidae
- Subfamily: Arctiinae
- Genus: Xanthopleura
- Species: X. flavocincta

Binomial name
- Xanthopleura flavocincta (Guérin-Méneville, [1844])

Synonyms
- Glaucopis flavocinctus Guérin-Méneville, [1844]

Species of moth

Xanthopleura flavocincta is a moth in the subfamily Arctiinae first described by Félix Édouard Guérin-Méneville in 1844. It is found in French Guiana.
