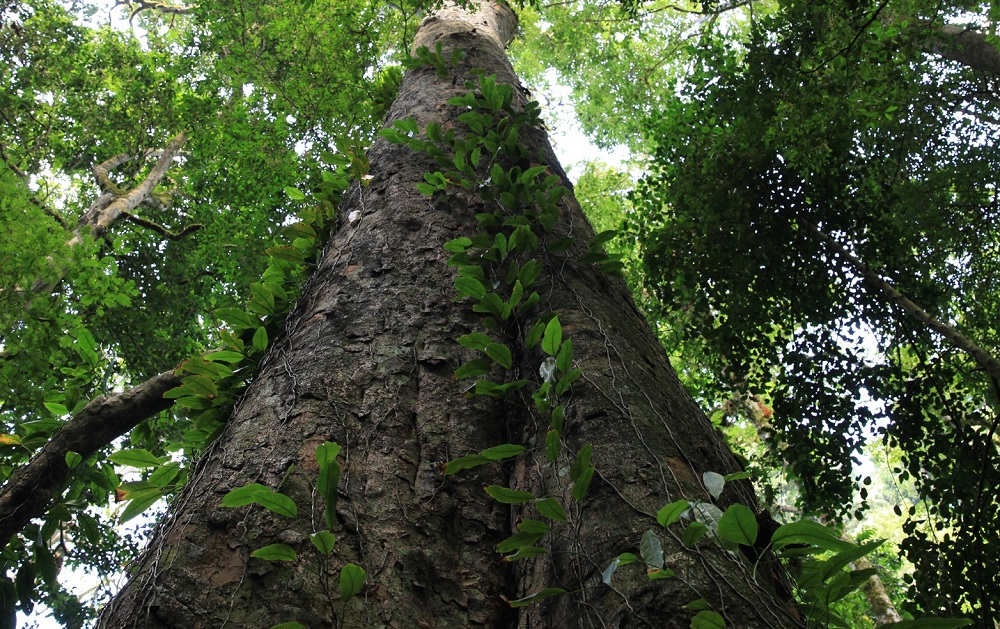
- Largest extant specimen of Entandrophragma excelsum at the slopes of Kilimanjaro measured at 81.5 m, being the tallest known tree in Africa, as photographed by researcher Andreas Hemp

Conservation status
- Least Concern (IUCN 2.3)

Scientific classification
- Kingdom: Plantae
- Clade: Tracheophytes
- Clade: Angiosperms
- Clade: Eudicots
- Clade: Rosids
- Order: Sapindales
- Family: Meliaceae
- Genus: Entandrophragma
- Species: E. excelsum

Binomial name
- Entandrophragma excelsum (Dawe & Sprague) Sprague

Synonyms
- Entandrophragma deiningeri Harms; Entandrophragma gillardini Ledoux; Entandrophragma speciosum Harms; Entandrophragma stolzii Harms; Pseudocedrela excelsa Dawe & Sprague

= Entandrophragma excelsum =

Species of tree

Entandrophragma excelsum, is Africa's tallest indigenous tree native to tropical East Africa and occurs in eastern D.R.of the Congo, Rwanda, Burundi, Uganda, Tanzania, Malawi and Zambia. This species is scattered in areas of upland semi-deciduous forest, in mid-elevation and montane rainforest, at (925 –) 1280 – 2150 metres elevation. It is locally also found in riverine forest.

== Description ==
Entandrophragma excelsum dioecious, deciduous large tree, commonly up to 45 (–60) m tall. Bole branchless for up to 27 m, straight and cylindrical, up to 200 (–250) cm in diameter, with large buttresses up to 5 m high.

In 2016 in a remote valley on the continent's highest mountain Kilimanjaro, northern Tanzania has been discovered Africa's tallest tree, it was measured at a height of 81.5 m (267 ft 5 in) tall, and a 2.55 m (8 ft 4 in) dbh and it is estimated to be 600 years old. This tree was discovered by Andreas Hemp at the University of Bayreuth in Germany, a researcher in plant systematics.

The ten tallest known individuals of Entandrophragma excelsum ranged from 59.2 to 81.5 m in height and 1.24 to 2.55 m diameter.

Leaves pinnate on stalks to 60 cm or more with 8–16 large leaflets, almost opposite, each one oblong, 8 – 18 (–30) cm long and 4.5 – 8 (–14) cm wide. Inflorescence, 25 – 30 cm long and 10 – 15 cm wide. Flowers unisexual, tiny, white or pinkish white.

The wood is moderately lightweight, with a density of 460–530 kg/m^{3} at 12% moisture content.

== Uses ==
The wood of Entandrophragma excelsum is not in much demand for local applications because it often warps and twists considerably upon drying. Moreover, it is not durable and not very attractively figured. Its occurrence in mountain regions often hampers commercial exploitation.

The wood is suitable for the production of sliced and rotary veneer, and can be made into plywood of satisfactory quality. The wood is suitable for construction, flooring, joinery, interior trim, furniture, cabinet work, musical instruments, vehicle bodies, toys, novelties, boxes, crates, carvings, turnery, veneer and plywood. The wood is used for fuel and to make charcoal.

== Vernacular names ==
Common local names for Entandrophragma excelsum tree:

- in Luganda language: Muyovu
- in Kiga language: Mushalya, muyove
- in Rukonjo language: Kikula
- in Runyankore language: Muyovu
- in Rutoro language: Muyovu, muhungura
- in Swahili language: Mkukusu

== See also ==
- List of tallest trees
- The Big Tree
