= Belemnia dubia =

Scientific classification
- Domain: Eukaryota
- Kingdom: Animalia
- Phylum: Arthropoda
- Class: Insecta
- Order: Lepidoptera
- Superfamily: Noctuoidea
- Family: Erebidae
- Subfamily: Arctiinae
- Genus: Belemnia
- Species: B. dubia

Binomial name
- Belemnia dubia Kirby, 1902

Synonyms
- Chrysaor gemmanseryx Hübner, 1804

Species of moth

Belemnia dubia is a moth of the subfamily Arctiinae. It was described by William Forsell Kirby in 1902. It is found in Brazil.
