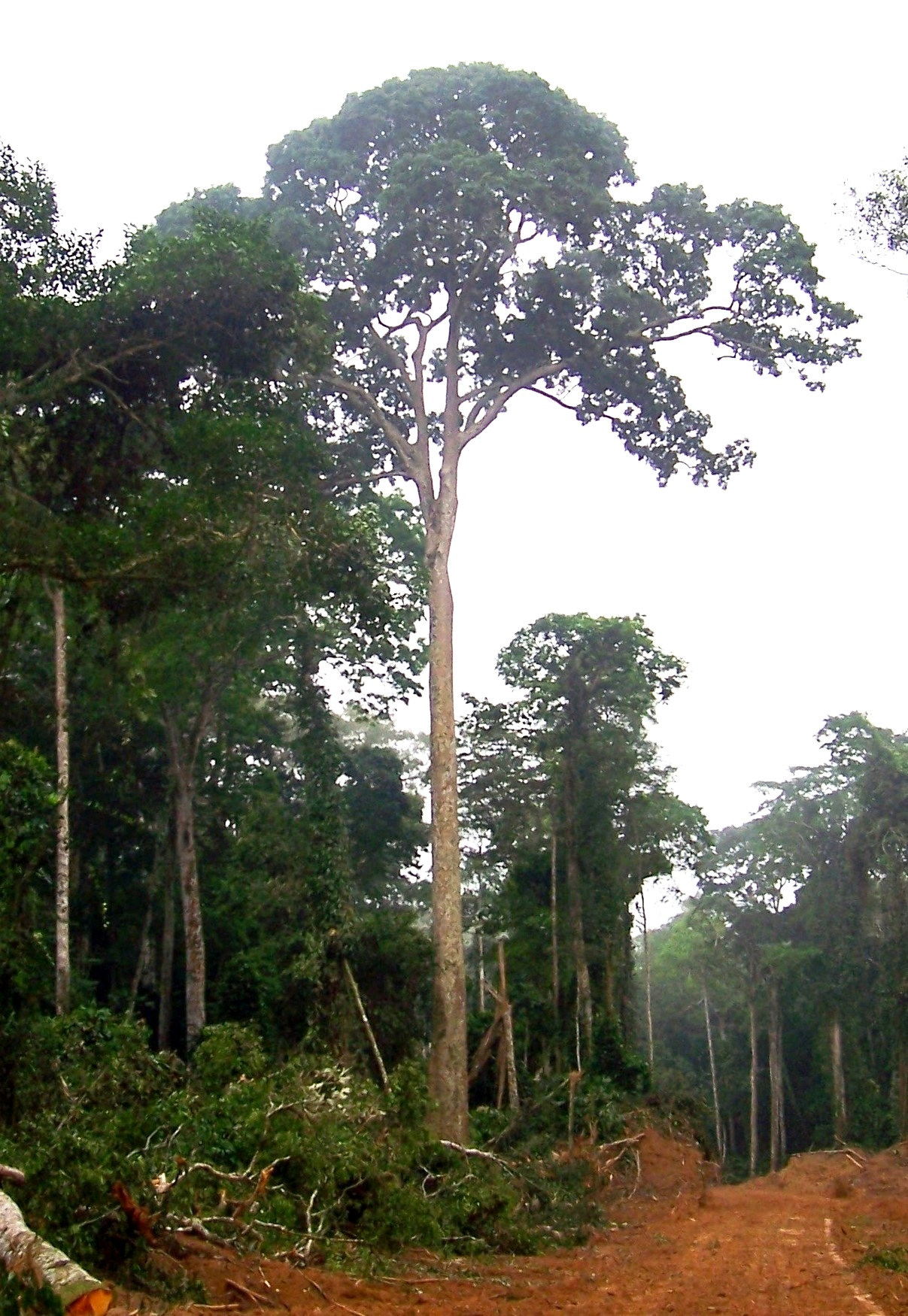
- Entandrophragma cylindricum

Scientific classification
- Kingdom: Plantae
- Clade: Tracheophytes
- Clade: Angiosperms
- Clade: Eudicots
- Clade: Rosids
- Order: Sapindales
- Family: Meliaceae
- Subfamily: Cedreloideae
- Genus: Entandrophragma; C.DC.

Species
- See text

Synonyms
- Heimodendron Sillans; Leioptyx Pierre ex De Wild.; Wulfhorstia C.DC.

= Entandrophragma =

Genus of flowering plants

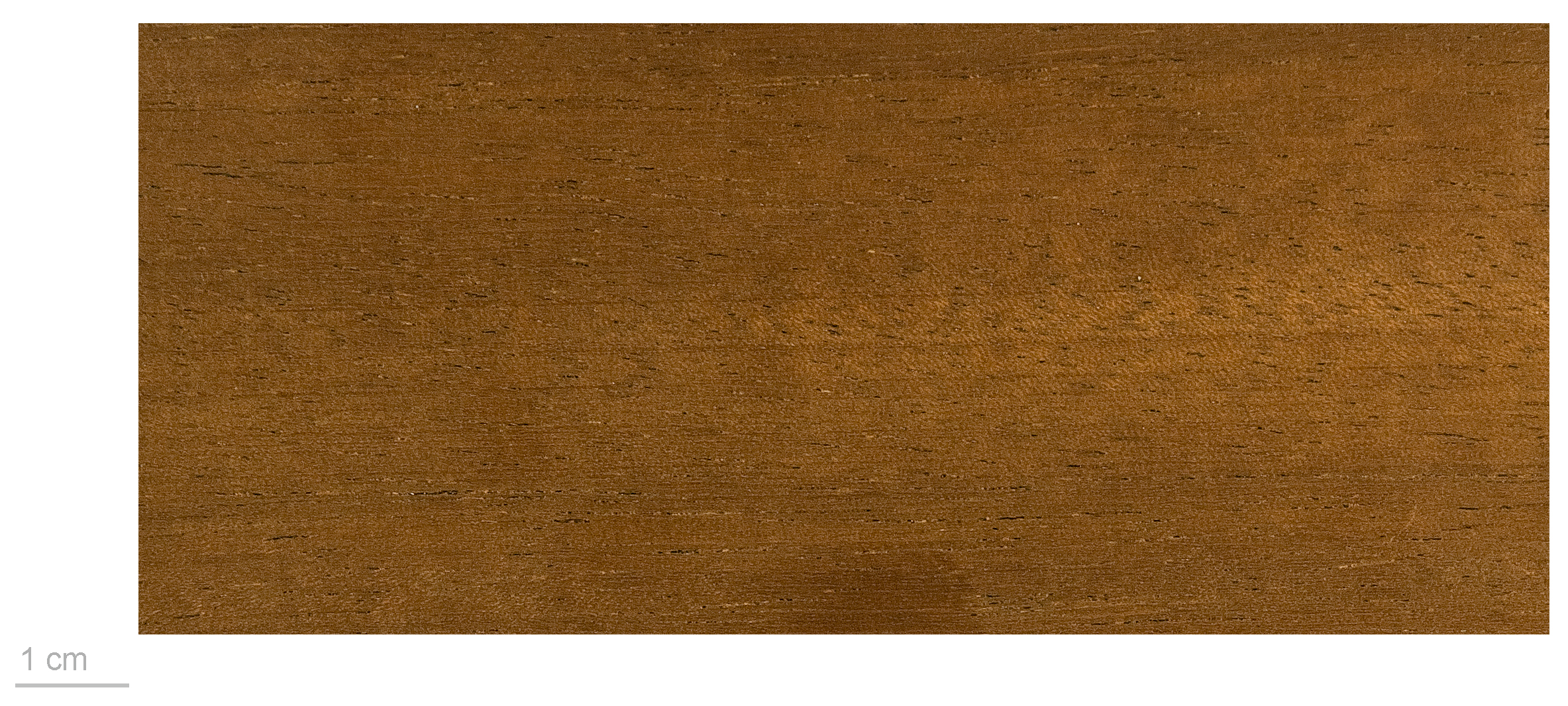
Entandrophragma candollei - MHNT

Entandrophragma is a genus of eleven known species of deciduous trees in the mahogany family Meliaceae.

== Description ==
Entandrophragma is restricted to tropical Africa. Some of the species attain large sizes, reaching 40–50 m tall, exceptionally to 60 m, and 2 m in trunk diameter. In 2016 a specimen of Entandrophragma excelsum towering at a height of 81.5 m (267 ft 5 in) tall, and a 2.55 m (8 ft 4 in) dbh was identified at Kilimanjaro.

It is dioecious, meaning that male and female flowers are borne on separate plants. The leaves are pinnate, with 5-9 pairs of leaflets, each leaflet 8–10 cm long with an acuminate tip. The flowers are produced in loose inflorescences, each flower small, with five yellowish petals about 2 mm long, and ten stamens. The fruit is a five-valved capsule containing numerous winged seeds.

== Species ==
As of January 2026, Plants of the World Online accepts the following 11 species:

- Entandrophragma angolense (Welw.) Panshin
- Entandrophragma bussei Harms ex Engl.
- Entandrophragma candollei Harms
- Entandrophragma caudatum (Sprague) Sprague
- Entandrophragma congoense (Pierre ex De Wild.) A.Chev.
- Entandrophragma cylindricum (Sprague) Sprague
- Entandrophragma delevoyi De Wild.
- Entandrophragma excelsum (Dawe & Sprague) Sprague
- Entandrophragma palustre Staner
- Entandrophragma spicatum (C.DC.) Sprague
- Entandrophragma utile (Dawe & Sprague) Sprague

== Uses ==
The timber of a few species is traded as a tropical hardwood. It is sometimes termed under the generic label of mahogany, and while Entandrophragma is part of the family Meliaceae, it is not classified as genuine mahogany. The species shares many of the characteristics of genuine mahogany and is used as an alternative, with Sapele and Utile in particular bearing a close resemblance.
