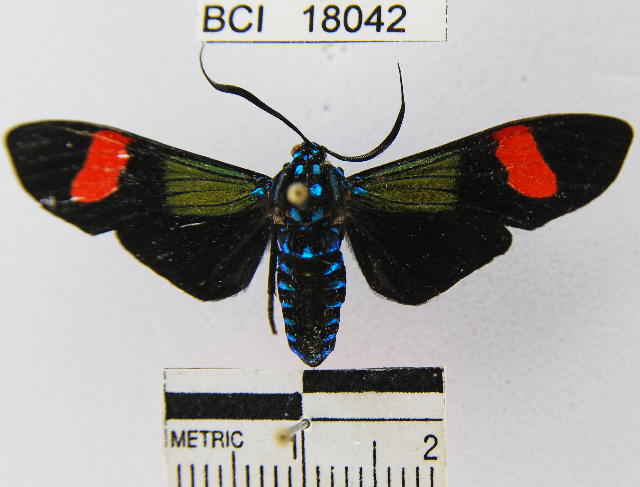
- Belemnia inaurata

Scientific classification
- Kingdom: Animalia
- Phylum: Arthropoda
- Class: Insecta
- Order: Lepidoptera
- Superfamily: Noctuoidea
- Family: Erebidae
- Subfamily: Arctiinae
- Genus: Belemnia; Walker, 1854

Synonyms
- Chrysaor Hübner, [1809]

= Belemnia =

Genus of moths

Belemnia is a genus of moths in the subfamily Arctiinae. The genus was erected by Francis Walker in 1854. Species are found in Central and South America.

== Species ==
- Belemnia alpha Druce, 1884 (Metriophyla alpha)
- Belemnia aplaga Hampson, 1901
- Belemnia dubia Kirby 1902
- Belemnia eryx Fabricius, 1775 (Zygaena eryx)
- Belemnia inaurata Sulzer, 1776 (Sphinx inaurata)
- Belemnia jovis Butler 1875
- Belemnia lydia Druce, 1896
- Belemnia mygdon Druce, 1900
- Belemnia ochriplaga Hampson, 1901
- Belemnia pavonia Forbes 1939
- Belemnia trotschi (Druce, 1884)
