= Xanthopleura perspicua =

Scientific classification
- Kingdom: Animalia
- Phylum: Arthropoda
- Class: Insecta
- Order: Lepidoptera
- Superfamily: Noctuoidea
- Family: Erebidae
- Subfamily: Arctiinae
- Genus: Xanthopleura
- Species: X. perspicua

Binomial name
- Xanthopleura perspicua (Walker, 1856)

Synonyms
- Calonota perspicua Walker, 1856; Calonotos sandion H. Druce, 1883

Species of moth

Xanthopleura perspicua is a moth in the subfamily Arctiinae first described by Francis Walker in 1856. It is found in Colombia, Ecuador and Pará, Brazil.
