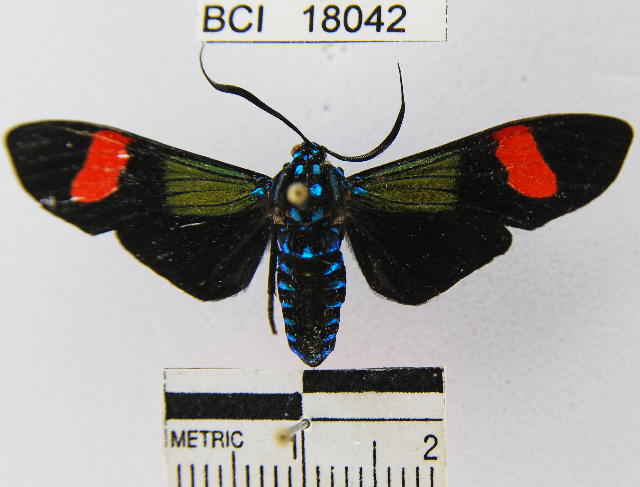

Scientific classification
- Domain: Eukaryota
- Kingdom: Animalia
- Phylum: Arthropoda
- Class: Insecta
- Order: Lepidoptera
- Superfamily: Noctuoidea
- Family: Erebidae
- Subfamily: Arctiinae
- Genus: Belemnia
- Species: B. inaurata

Binomial name
- Belemnia inaurata (Sulzer, 1776)

Synonyms
- Sphinx inaurata Sulzer, 1776; Belemnia jovis Butler, 1875

= Belemnia inaurata =

Species of moth

Belemnia inaurata is a moth of the subfamily Arctiinae. It was described by Sulzer in 1776. It is found in Mexico, Guatemala, Honduras, Panama and Colombia.

== Subspecies ==
- Belemnia inaurata inaurata (Mexico, Guatemala, Honduras, Panama)
- Belemnia inaurata rezia Druce, 1896 (Colombia)
