= Belemnia alpha =

Scientific classification
- Domain: Eukaryota
- Kingdom: Animalia
- Phylum: Arthropoda
- Class: Insecta
- Order: Lepidoptera
- Superfamily: Noctuoidea
- Family: Erebidae
- Subfamily: Arctiinae
- Genus: Belemnia
- Species: B. alpha

Binomial name
- Belemnia alpha (H. Druce, 1884)

Synonyms
- Metriophyla alpha H. Druce, 1884; Heliura alpha

Species of moth

Belemnia alpha is a moth of the subfamily Arctiinae. It was described by Herbert Druce in 1884. It is found in Panama.
