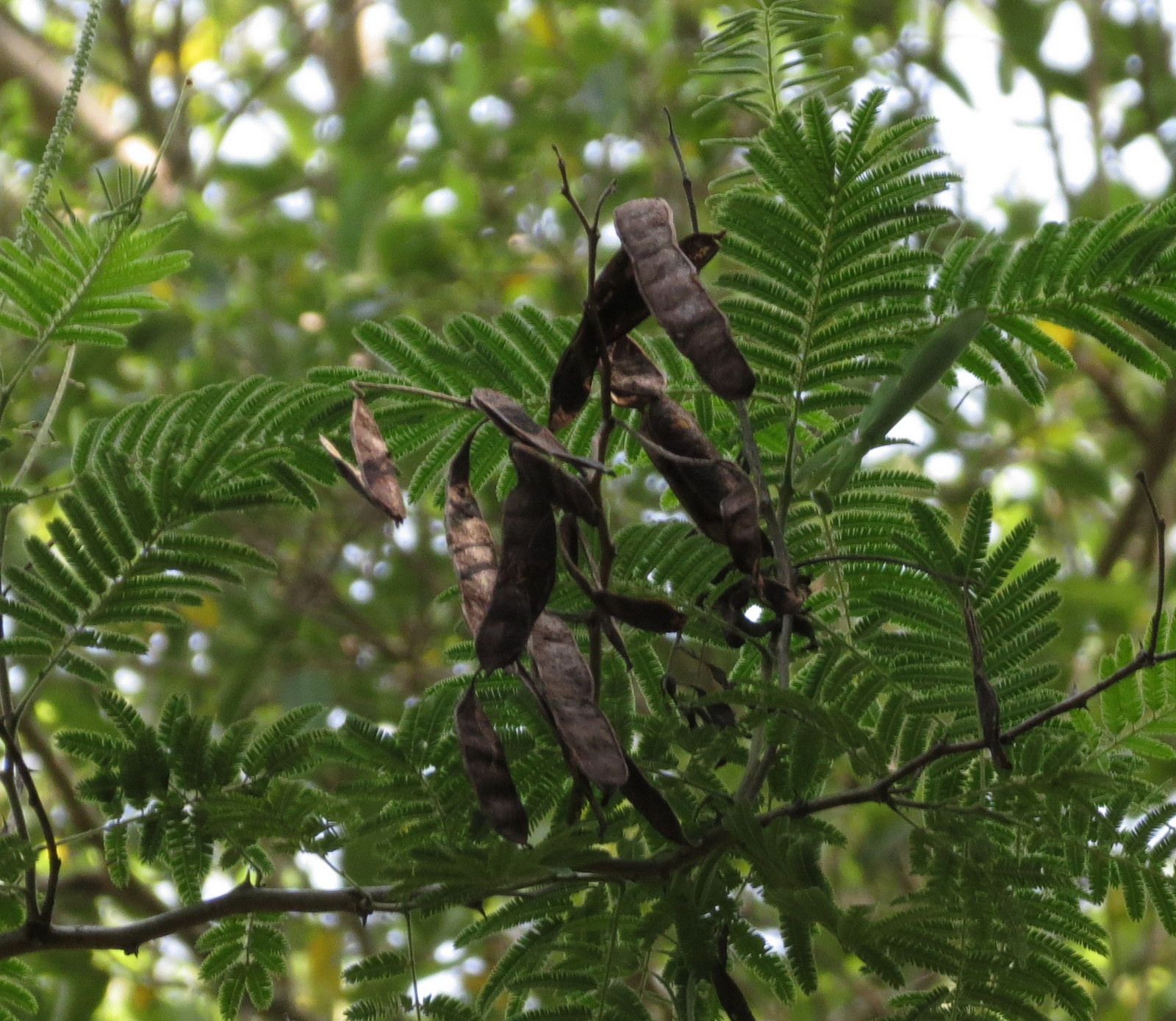
- Senegalia polyacantha subsp. polyacantha, Bengaluru, Karnataka, India

Scientific classification
- Kingdom: Plantae
- Clade: Embryophytes
- Clade: Tracheophytes
- Clade: Angiosperms
- Clade: Eudicots
- Clade: Rosids
- Order: Fabales
- Family: Fabaceae
- Subfamily: Caesalpinioideae
- Clade: Mimosoid clade
- Genus: Senegalia
- Species: S. polyacantha

Binomial name
- Senegalia polyacantha (Willd.) Seigler & Ebinger

Subspecies
- Senegalia polyacantha subsp. campylacantha (Hochst. ex. A.Rich.) Kyal. & Boatwr.; Senegalia polyacantha subsp. polyacantha (Willd.) Seigler & Ebinger

Synonyms
- Acacia catechu sensu Griseb.; Acacia catechu auct. non L.; Acacia polyacantha Willd.; Acacia suma (Roxb.) Voigt; Gagnebina tamariscina sensu Bojer; Mimosa suma Roxb.; Senegalia suma (Roxb.) Britton & Rose

= Senegalia polyacantha =

Species of legume

Senegalia polyacantha (syn. Acacia polyacantha), also known as white thorn, is a flowering tree which can grow up to 25 m tall. The species name polyacantha has the meaning "many thorns" in Latin. The tree is native to Africa, India, the Indian Ocean and Asia, but it has also been introduced to the Caribbean.

== Taxonomy ==
There are two subspecies:

- Senegalia polyacantha subsp. polyacantha — Indian subcontinent.
- Senegalia polyacantha subsp. campylacantha — Africa. Leaves very finely divided bipinnate, with up to 60 pairs of primary pinnae, each with as many as 66 pairs of leaflets.

== Uses ==
=== Gum ===
The tree's gum is used in the manufacture of candy.

=== Medicinal purposes ===
The roots and perhaps its bark have medicinal uses. The root extract is useful for snakebites and is applied to wash the skin of children who are agitated at night time. The root is also used for treating gonorrhea, venereal diseases, dysentery and gastrointestinal disorders.

=== Tannin ===
The bark is useful for tanning.

=== Wood ===
The tree's primary use is for wood.
