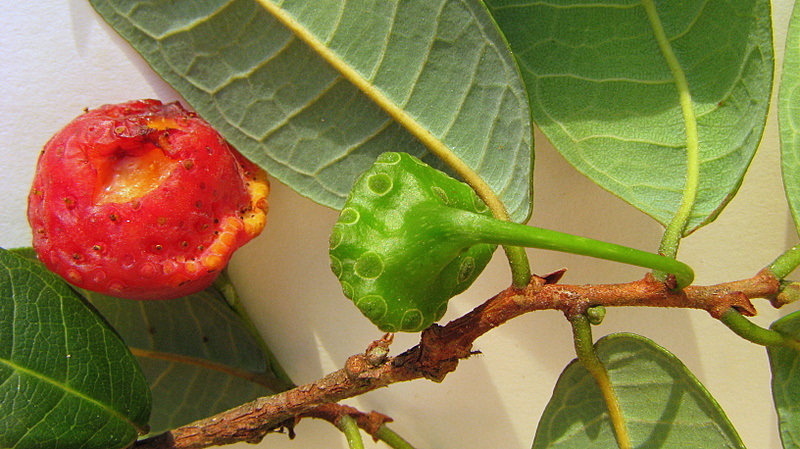
- Ripe and unripe fruit
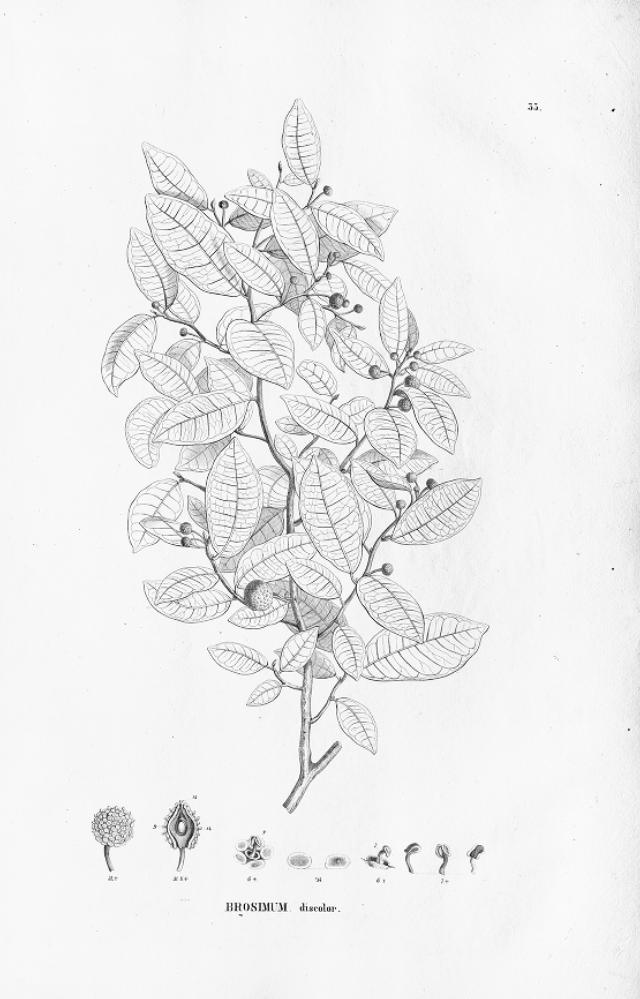
- Botanical illustration

Conservation status
- Least Concern (IUCN 3.1)

Scientific classification
- Kingdom: Plantae
- Clade: Tracheophytes
- Clade: Angiosperms
- Clade: Eudicots
- Clade: Rosids
- Order: Rosales
- Family: Moraceae
- Genus: Brosimum
- Species: B. guianense

Binomial name
- Brosimum guianense (Aubl.) Huber ex Ducke

Synonyms
- List: Alicastrum guianense (Aubl.) Kuntze; Brosimum aubletii Poepp. & Endl.; Brosimum discolor Schott; Brosimum lecointei Ducke; Brosimum palmarum Standl.; Brosimum panamense (Pittier) Standl. & Steyerm.; Brosimum rotundatum Standl.; Brosimum tessmannii Mildbr.; Brosimum velutinum (S.F.Blake) Ducke; Piratinera discolor (Schott) Pittier; Piratinera guianensis Aubl.; Piratinera lecointei Ducke; Piratinera lemeei Benoist; Piratinera mollis Killip; Piratinera panamensis Pittier; Piratinera scabridula S.F.Blake; Piratinera velutina S.F.Blake

= Brosimum guianense =

Species of flowering plant

Brosimum guianense, called snakewood, letterwood, leopardwood, and amourette, is a species of flowering plant in the genus Brosimum, native to southern Mexico, Central America, Trinidad, and tropical South America. A tree reaching 40 m (130 ft), its heartwood can command a price of €25 per kg in the form of half stems.

== Composition and properties ==
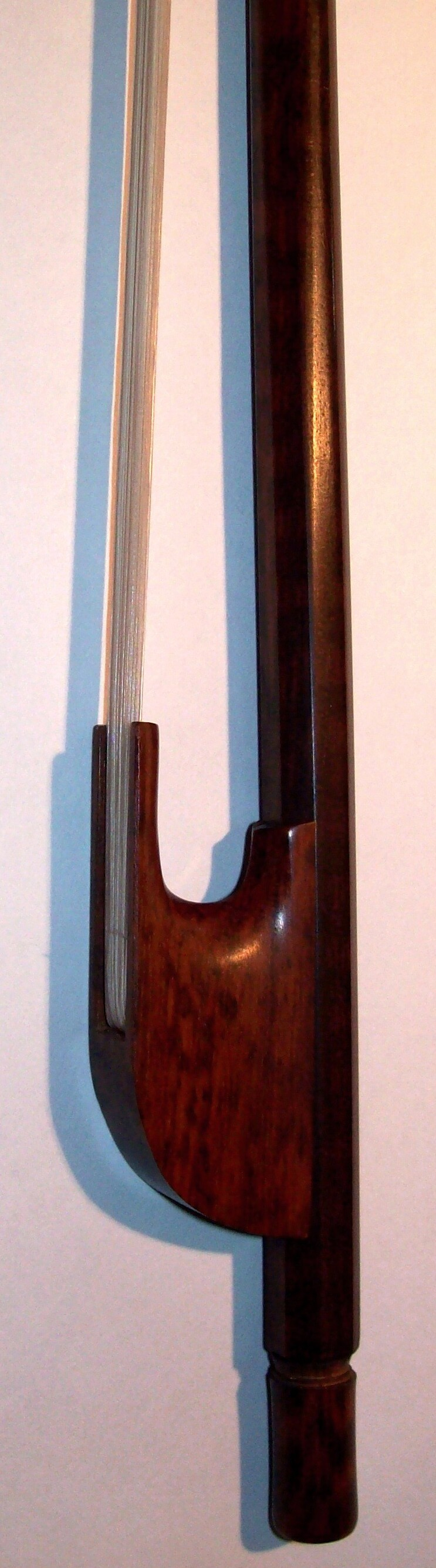
Amourette was once the main wood used for bow frogs

The wood is noted for its high natural durability and exceptional physical properties, which are linked to its anatomical and chemical composition. The heartwood consists of approximately 39% lignin, 54% carbohydrates, and 0.4% lipophilic compounds of unspecified origin. The fibres are very thick-walled, while the vessels contain numerous sclerotic tyloses and organic deposits. Extractives occur in high concentrations in the parenchyma cells, tyloses, and cell walls; some of the detected phenolic extractives are flavonoid in character. Calcium oxalate crystals are found in the upright and square ray cells and, more sporadically, in axial parenchyma cells. These features contribute to the wood’s well-known natural durability.

The wood is also extremely dense and mechanically strong. At 12% moisture content, heartwood density ranges from 1.1 to 1.4 g/cm³. Its compressive strength is 119 N/mm², flexural strength 241 N/mm², elastic modulus 23,200 N/mm², and hardness 196 N/mm², indicating exceptionally high elastomechanical properties.

== Applications ==
It was the wood of choice for the making of bows for musical instruments of the violin family until the late 18th century, when it was replaced by the more easily worked brazilwood (Paubrasilia echinata).

== Gallery ==
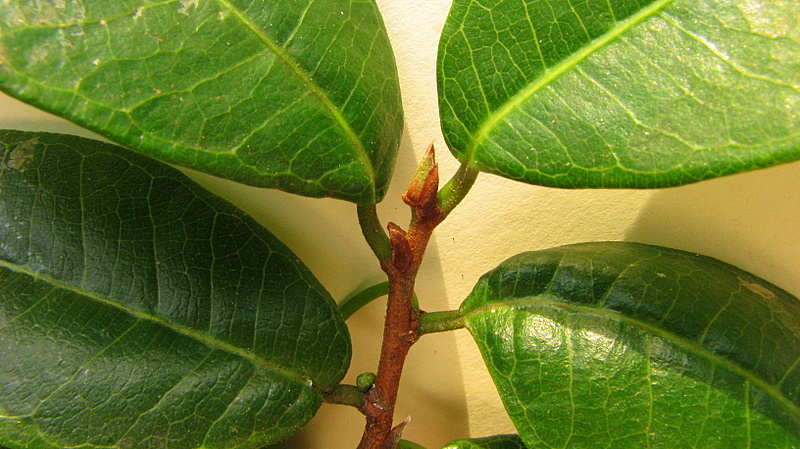
Leaves and twig

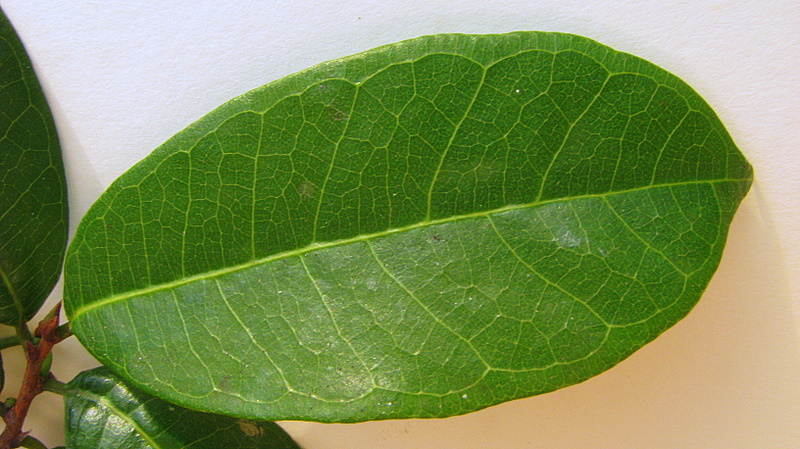
Close up of adaxial surface of leaf

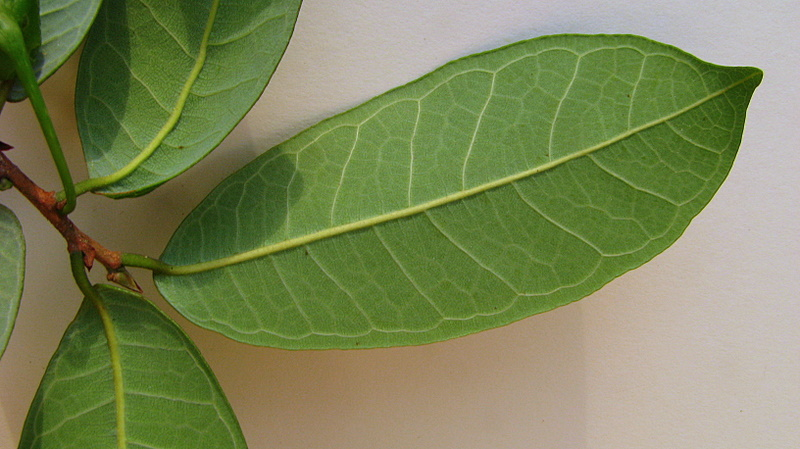
Close up of abaxial surface of leaf

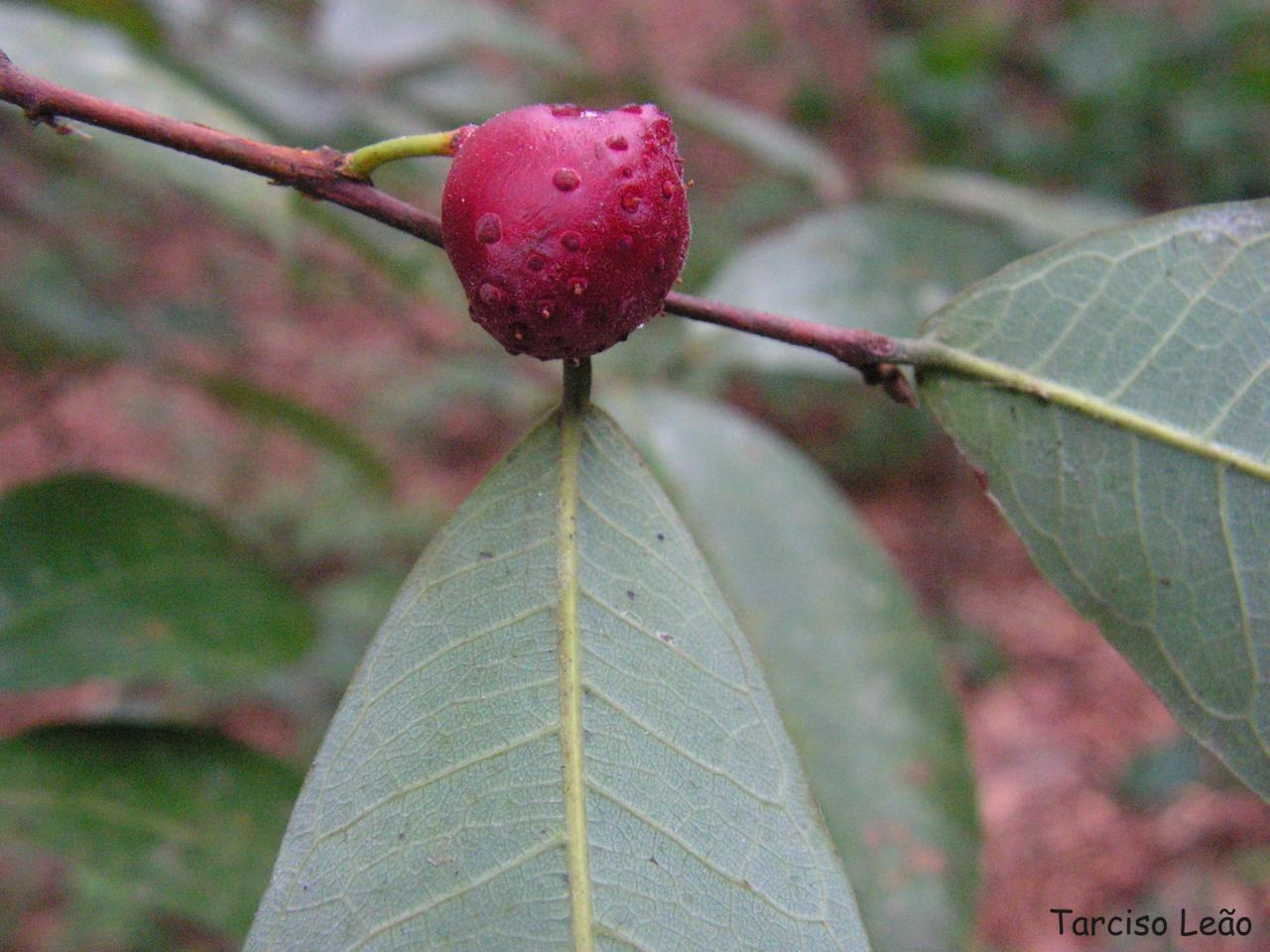
Ripe fruit

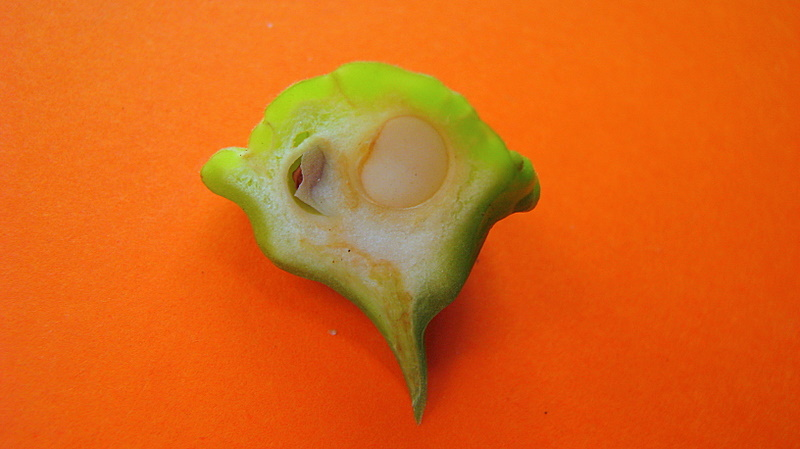
Section of unripe fruit

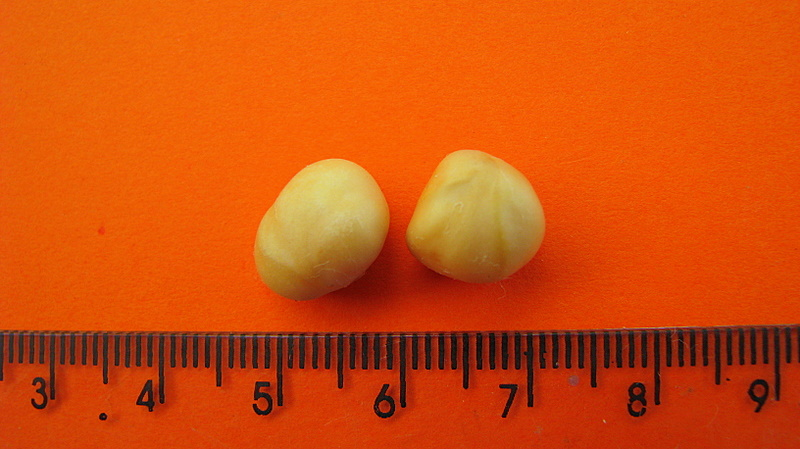
Seeds

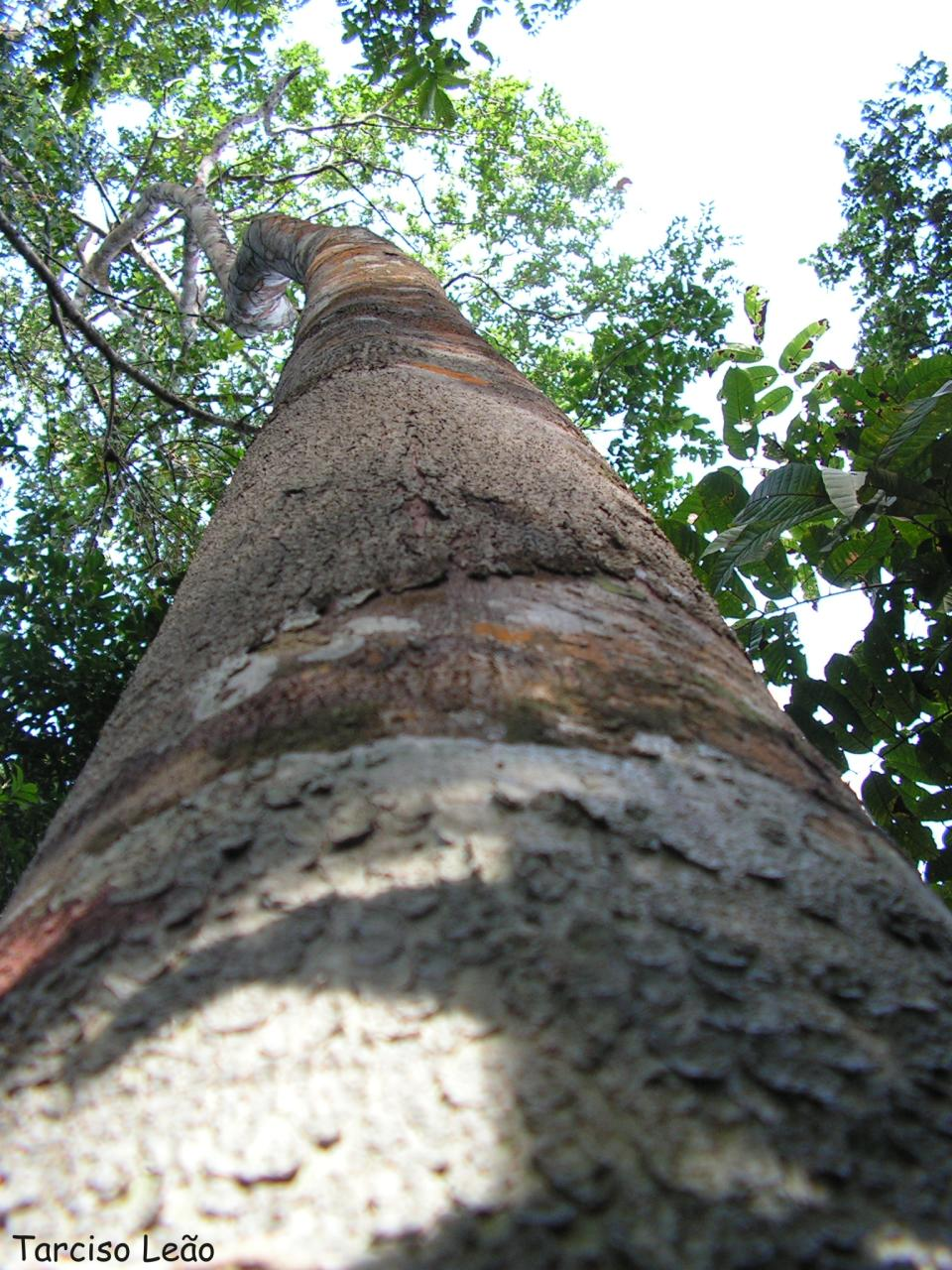
Bole

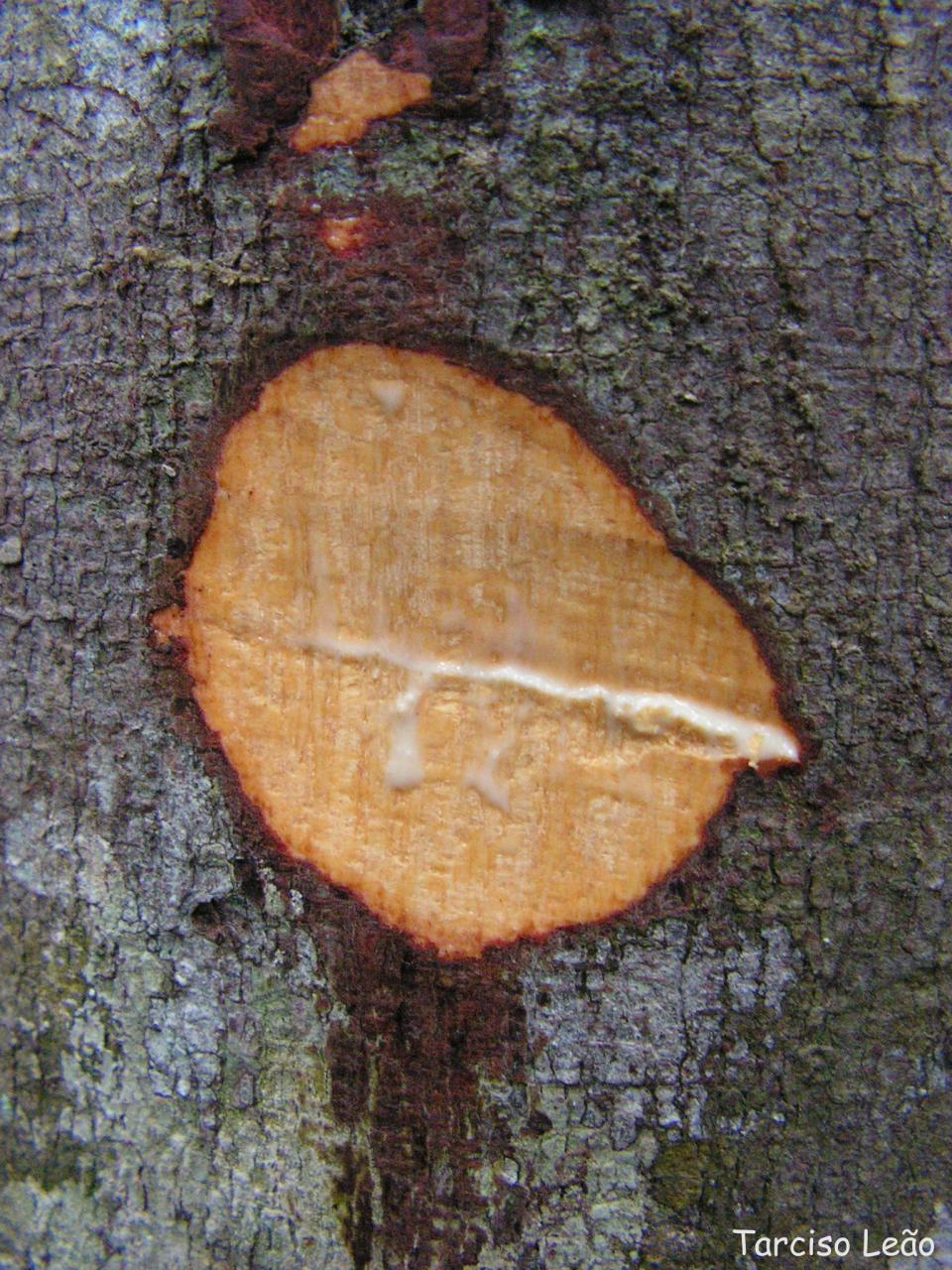
Latex oozing from wound

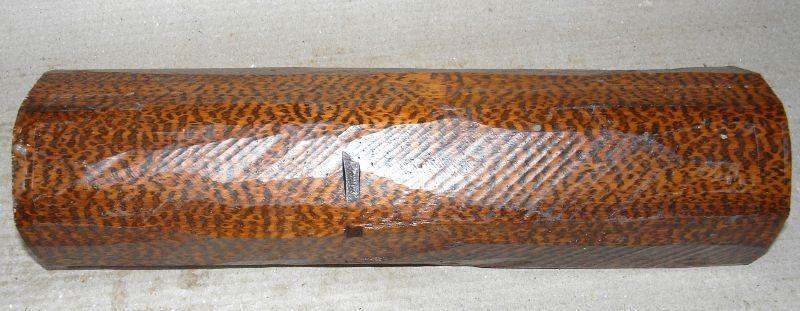
Figure on heartwood
