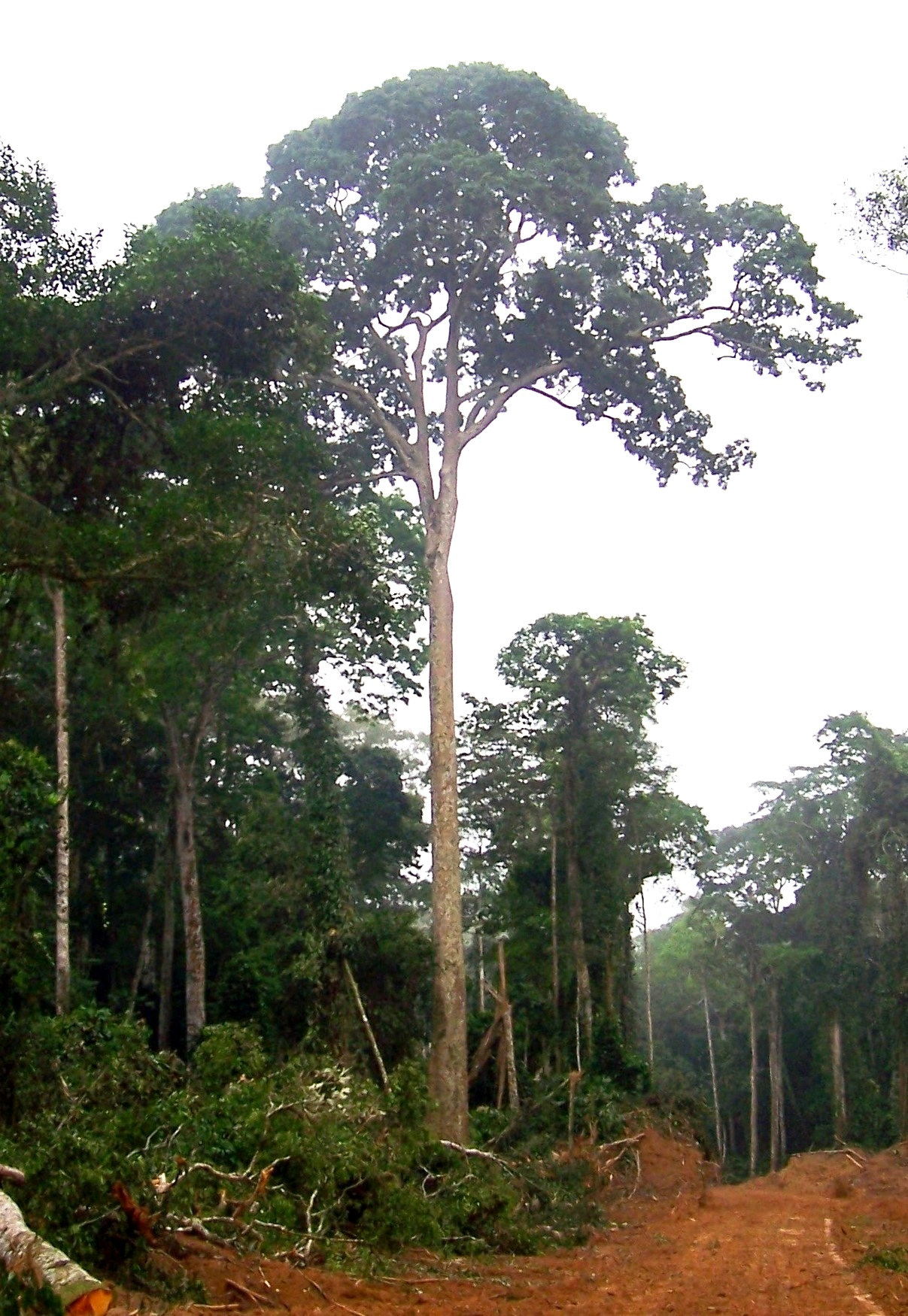
- A sapele near Brazzaville, Republic of the Congo

Conservation status
- Vulnerable (IUCN 2.3)

Scientific classification
- Kingdom: Plantae
- Clade: Tracheophytes
- Clade: Angiosperms
- Clade: Eudicots
- Clade: Rosids
- Order: Sapindales
- Family: Meliaceae
- Genus: Entandrophragma
- Species: E. cylindricum

Binomial name
- Entandrophragma cylindricum Harms

= Sapele =

Species of tree

Entandrophragma cylindricum is a tree of the genus Entandrophragma of the family Meliaceae. It is commonly known as sapele or sapelli (/səˈpiːliː/ sə-PEE-lee) or sapele mahogany, as well as aboudikro, assi, and muyovu.

== Origin of the name ==
The name sapele comes from the city of Sapele in Nigeria, where the tree flourishes. African Timber and Plywood, a division of the United Africa Company, had a factory at this location where the wood, along with African whitewood and African mahogany, was processed into timber which was then exported.

== Description ==
The species grows to a height of up to 45 metres (148 ft). In Ghana, it has been reported to reach 60 meters (196 ft) in height. The leaves are deciduous in the dry season, alternately arranged, pinnate, with 5–9 pairs of leaflets, each leaflet about 10 cm long. The flowers are produced in loose inflorescences when the tree is leafless, each flower about 5 millimetres (1/4 in) diameter, with five yellowish petals. The fruit is a pendulous capsule about 10 centimetres (4 in) long and 4 cm broad; when mature it splits into five sections to release 15–20 seeds.

== Distribution and conservation ==
Sapele is native to tropical Africa. There are protected populations and felling restrictions in place in various countries.

== Uses ==
This commercially important hardwood is reminiscent of mahogany, and is a part of the same Meliaceae family. It is darker in tone and has a distinctive figure. Sapele is particularly prized for a lustrous, iridescent chatoyance, with colours that range from light pink to brown and gold to red. The timber provides high chatoyance, with an average value above 20 PZC.

The timber has a high density range of 640–750 kg/m^{3} and interlocked grain, which can make machining somewhat difficult. Demand for sapele increased as a mahogany substitute in recent years due to genuine mahogany becoming a CITES Appendix II listed species. It is used in the manufacture of furniture, joinery, veneers, luxury flooring, musical instruments, and boat building.

In musical instruments, it is used for the back and sides (and sometimes top) of acoustic guitar bodies, as well as the bodies of electric guitars. It is also used in manufacturing the neck piece of ukuleles and 26- and 36-string harps. In the late 1990s, it started to be used as a board for Basque percussion instruments txalaparta.

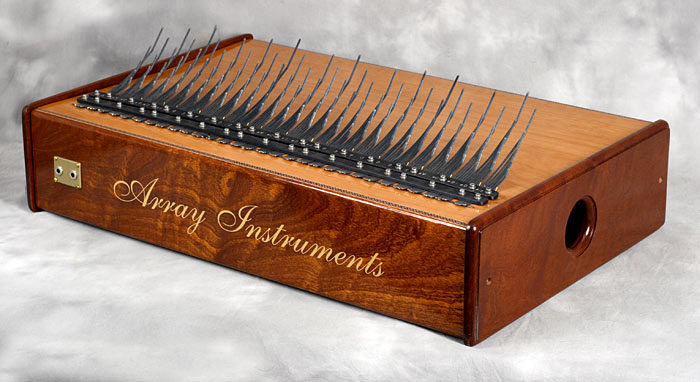
An array mbira made of sapele wood
