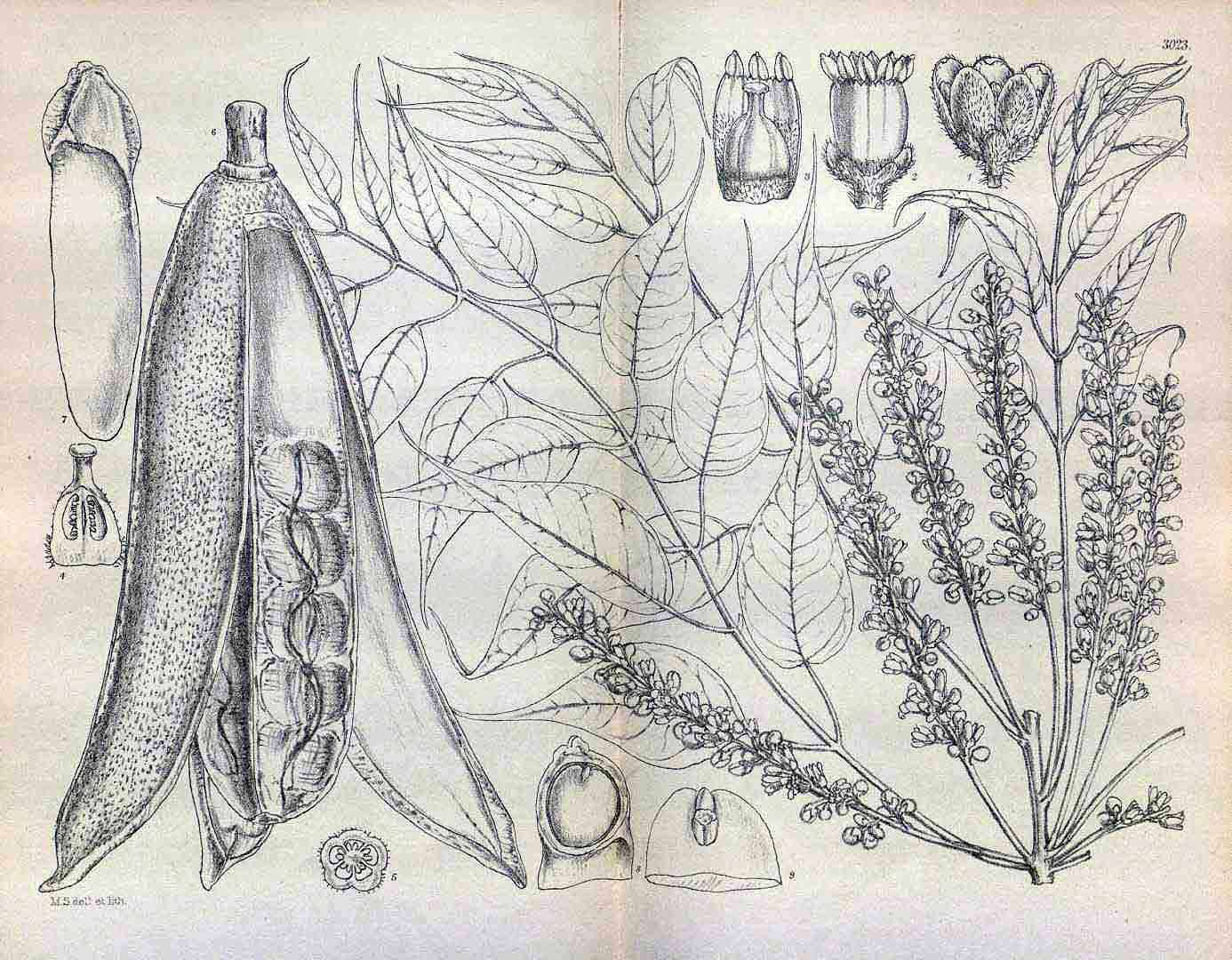
- Hooker's Icones Plantarum, vol. 31: t. 3023 (1915) by Matilda Smith

Conservation status
- Least Concern (IUCN 2.3)

Scientific classification
- Kingdom: Plantae
- Clade: Embryophytes
- Clade: Tracheophytes
- Clade: Angiosperms
- Clade: Eudicots
- Clade: Rosids
- Order: Sapindales
- Family: Meliaceae
- Genus: Entandrophragma
- Species: E. caudatum

Binomial name
- Entandrophragma caudatum Thomas Archibald Sprague (1910)

= Entandrophragma caudatum =

Species of flowering plant

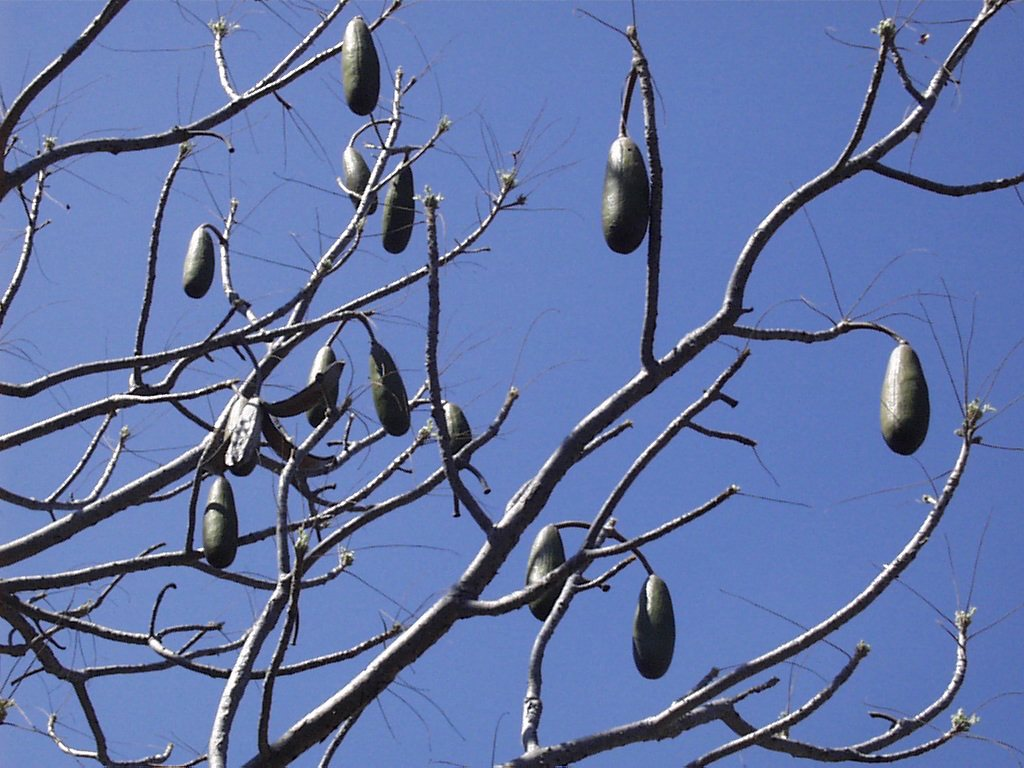
Immature fruits

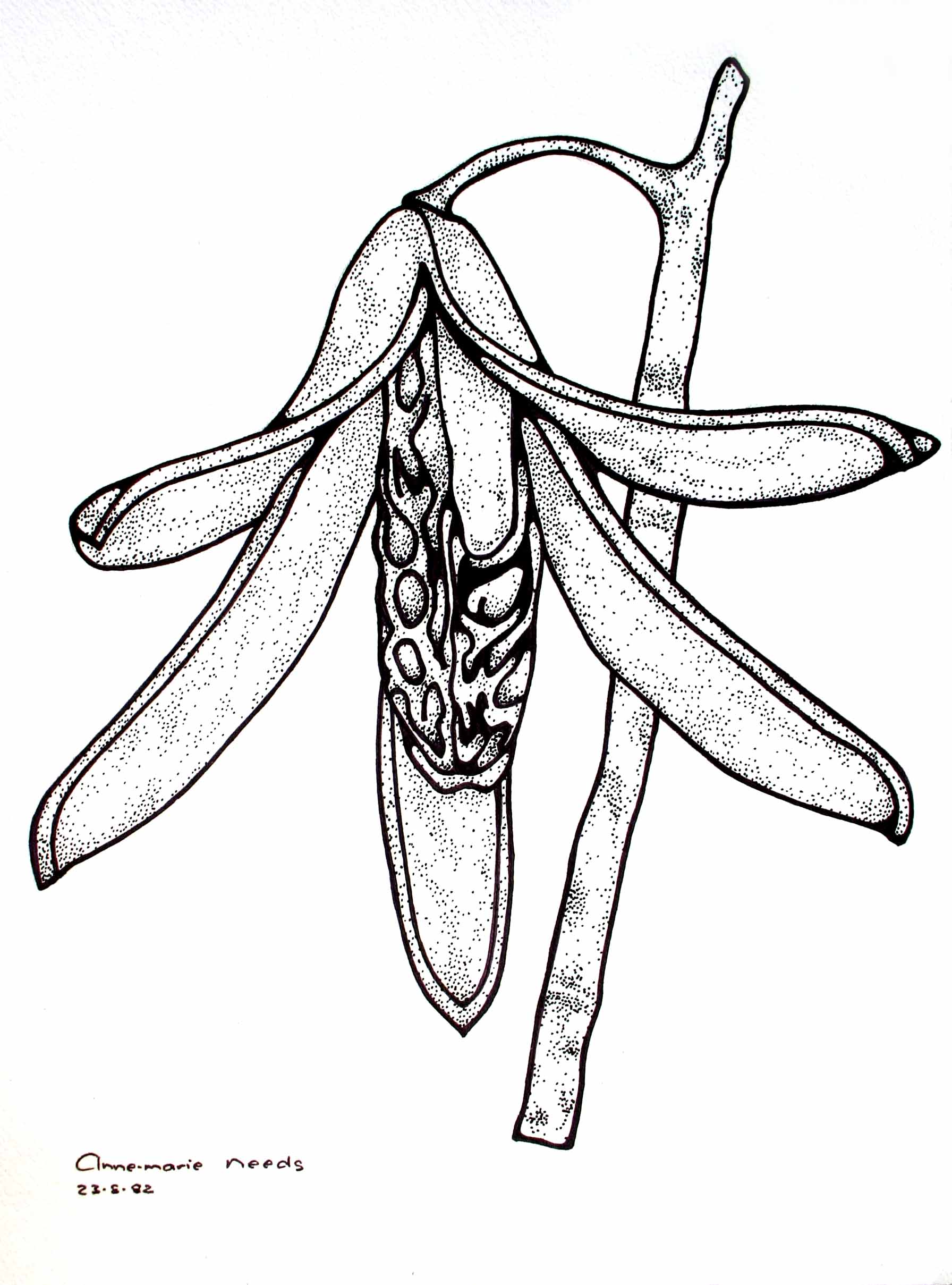
Dehisced fruit

Entandrophragma caudatum, or mountain mahogany, is a large Southern African tree belonging to the mahogany family and found in eastern and north eastern South Africa, Eswatini, Botswana, Angola, the Caprivi Strip region of Namibia, Zimbabwe, Zambia and Malawi. Kew currently recognises 12 other species of Entandrophragma, all with a tropical and sub-tropical African distribution.

This is a large deciduous tree up to 20m in height, found at low altitudes in river valleys, but also in open woodland on rocky slopes and ridges. Bark is grey, flaking in large, irregular scales and revealing a buff surface, giving a mottled appearance. The leaves up to 25 cm long, puberulous, crowded near the ends of branches, paripinnately compound with 6 or 7 pairs of leaflets, each leaflet measuring up to 11 x 3.5 cm. The leaflets are hairless with a narrowly attenuate apex or drip tip, and entire margin. Petioles are some 20mm in length and slender, causing the leaflets to droop. Flowers are green in colour and in branched sprays some 20 cm long arising from the axils of leaves. Engler & Prantl favoured placing E. caudatum in Wulfhorstia because it has only 6 ovules in each loculus, and because it lacks partitions inside the staminal tube, the feature which struck Anne Casimir Pyrame de Candolle when he named it Entandrophragma in 1894. The partitions, though, are variable in species and are very short in Entandrophragma speciosa Harms, so that the differences between the two genera become trivial and untenable.

The fruit of this species is remarkable and when green has the form of a cigar- or club-shaped capsule some 40mm in diameter at the thick end and some 150mm in length. When mature the five woody, closely lenticellate, pale brown valves curve back from the thickened tip, leaving a central column intact with impressions of the seeds - in overall appearance that of a half-peeled banana. Seeds are large and winged, 9–10 × 2·5 cm, spinning as they fall, and carried some distance from the tree by wind. Seedlings have large, simple, corrugated leaves with prominent veins, and differ greatly from mature leaves.

Other members of the genus Entandrophragma are exploited commercially for timber, but this species is too sparsely distributed to be economically viable, even though its wood is dark brown with an attractive figure. The wood is moderately dense at 700–815 kg/cubic meter. E. caudatum is often associated with Baikiaea plurijuga on Kalahari Sands, and logs were traditionally used to carve canoes for the Paramount Chief of Barotseland, while the bark was sometimes used for dyeing and tanning. The seed, bark and wood have been shown to contain a mixture of limonoids. Entandrophragma angolense (Welw.) is a forest tree up to 50m in height with a clean bole up to 25m though sometimes with prominent buttresses extending 6-7m up the bole.

== Synonyms ==
- Pseudocedrela caudata Sprague (1908)
- Entandrophragma utile sensu Gomes e Sousa, Dendrol. Mozamb. (1951)

== Publications ==
Kew Bull. 1910: 180 (1910); in Hook., Ic. Pl. 31: t. 3023 (1915). — Bremek. & Oberm. in Ann. Transv. Mus. 16: 420 (1935). — Harms in Notizbl. Bot. Gart. Berl. 14: 443–4 (1939). — O. B. Mill, in Journ. S. Afr. Bot. 18: 39 (1952). — Pardy in Rhod. Agr. Journ. 52: 515 cum photogr. (1955). — Williamson, Useful Pl. Nyasal.: 55 (1956). — Palgrave, Trees of Central Afr.: 218 cum photogr. et tab. (1957). — White, F.F.N.R.: 180, fig. 35C–E (1962). TAB. 55 fig. B. Type from the Transvaal.
