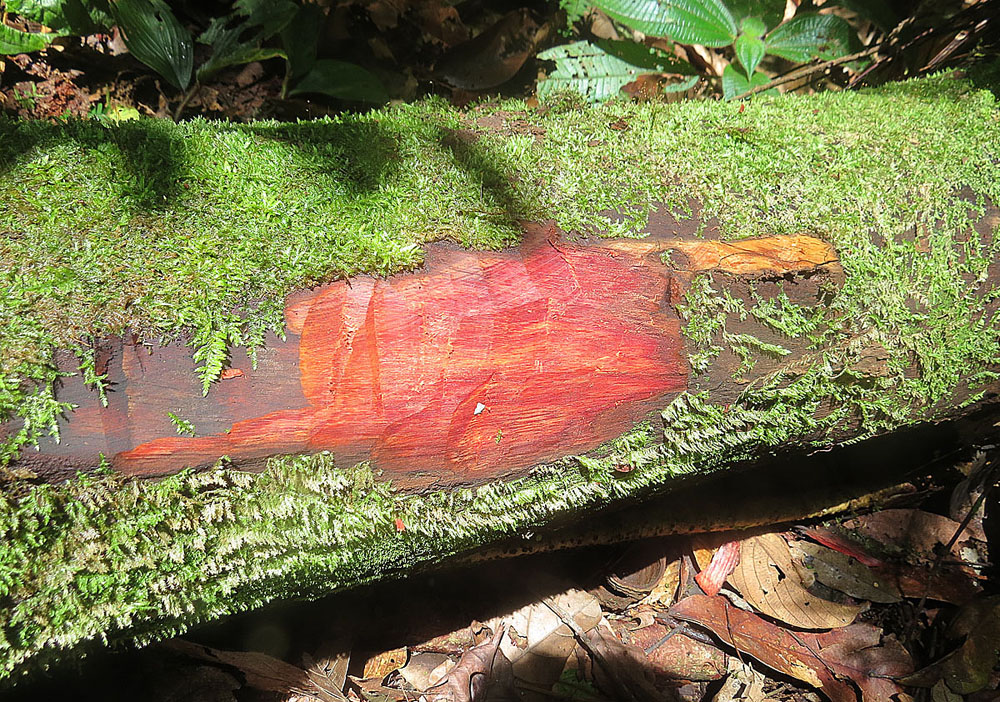
- Fallen log showing bloodwood
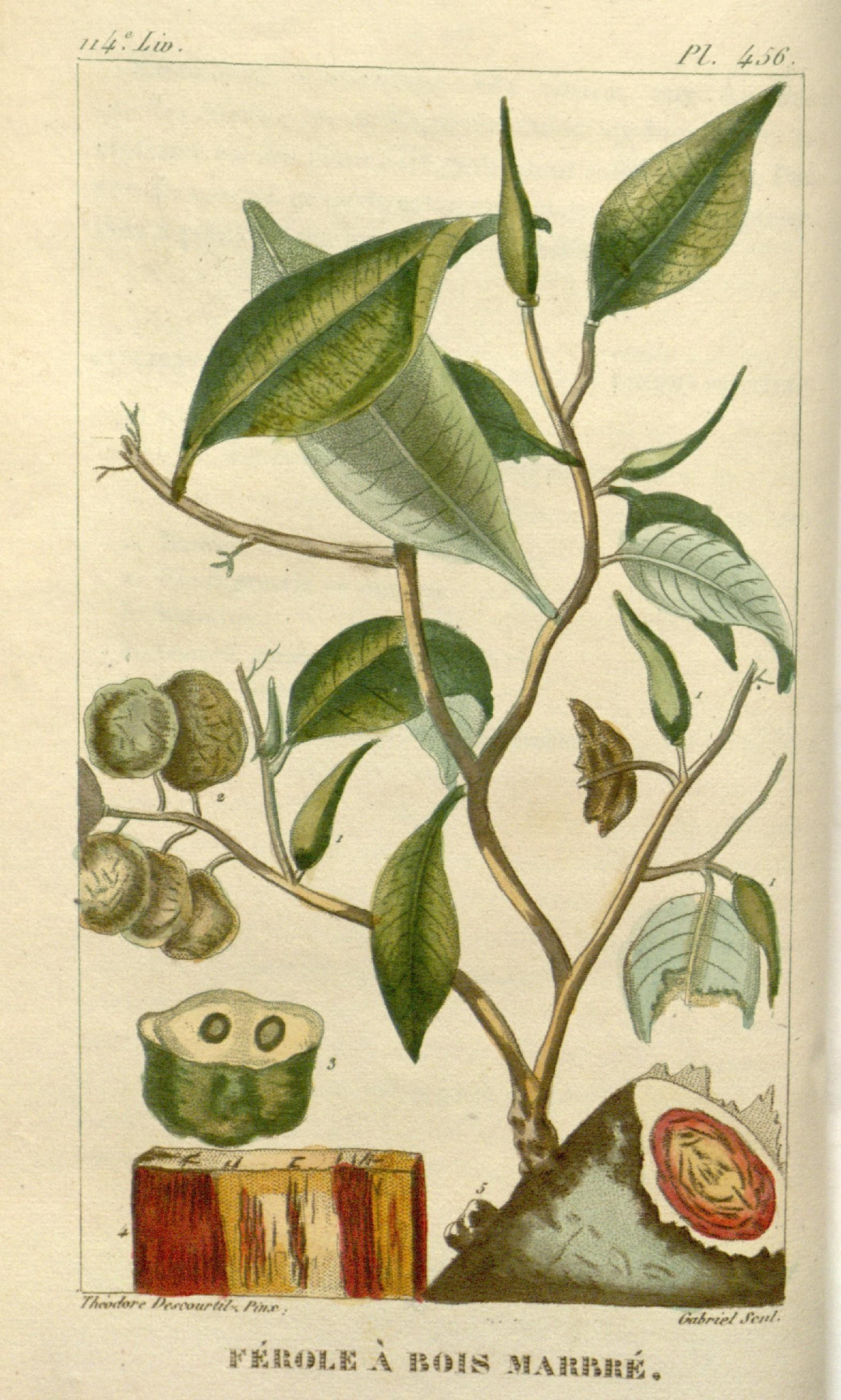
- Botanical illustration

Conservation status
- Least Concern (IUCN 3.1)

Scientific classification
- Kingdom: Plantae
- Clade: Tracheophytes
- Clade: Angiosperms
- Clade: Eudicots
- Clade: Rosids
- Order: Rosales
- Family: Moraceae
- Genus: Brosimum
- Species: B. rubescens

Binomial name
- Brosimum rubescens Taub.

Synonyms
- List: Alicastrum rubescens Taub.; Brosimum angustifolium Ducke; Brosimum brevipedunculatum Ducke; Brosimum caloxylon Standl.; Brosimum lanciferum Ducke; Brosimum longistipulatum Ducke; Brosimum paraense Huber; Brosimum platyneurum Ducke; Ferolia guianensis Aubl.; Ferolia variegata Lam.; Parinari guianensis (Aubl.) Lemée; Piratinera angustifolia Ducke; Piratinera lancifera Ducke; Piratinera paraensis (Huber) Ducke; Piratinera rubescens (Taub.) Pittier

= Brosimum rubescens =

Species of plant

Brosimum rubescens, the bloodwood, is a widespread species of flowering plant in the family Moraceae. It is native to Panama and wet tropical South America. A straight-trunked tree reaching 40 m (130 ft), it is typically found in lowland forests and in forest edges between rainforest and savannah. Often forming monotypic stands, it is harvested for its timber, but is assessed as Least Concern.
