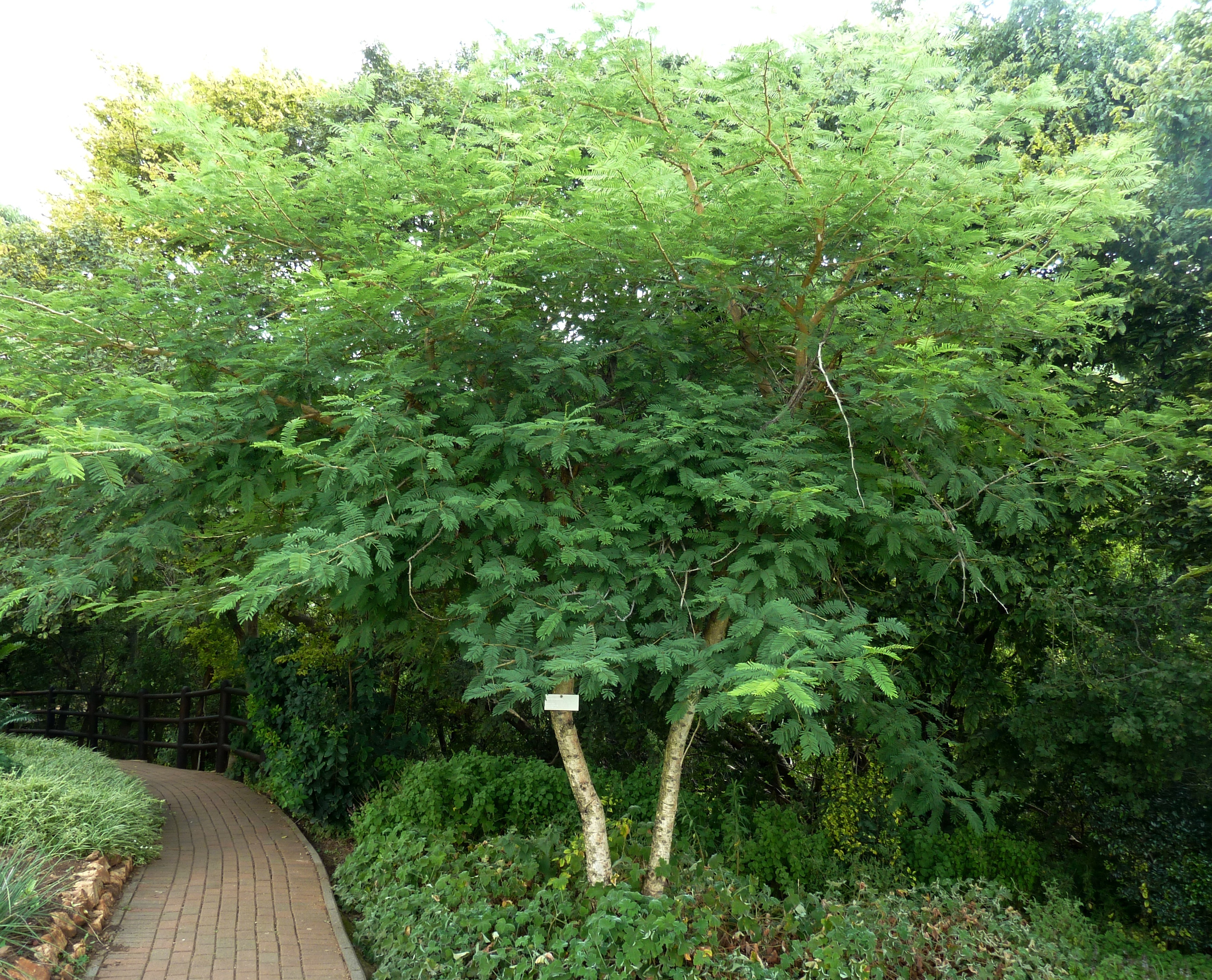

Scientific classification
- Kingdom: Plantae
- Clade: Tracheophytes
- Clade: Angiosperms
- Clade: Eudicots
- Clade: Rosids
- Order: Fabales
- Family: Fabaceae
- Subfamily: Caesalpinioideae
- Clade: Mimosoid clade
- Genus: Senegalia
- Species: S. polyacantha
- Subspecies: S. p. subsp. campylacantha

Trinomial name
- Senegalia polyacantha subsp. campylacantha (Hochst. ex. A.Rich.) Kyal. & Boatwr.
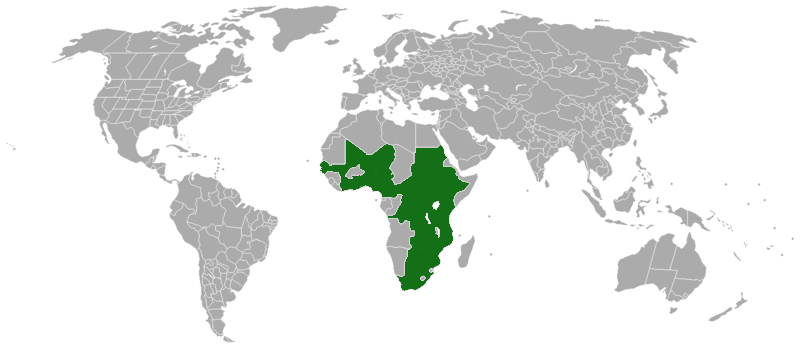
- Range of S. p. subsp. campylacantha

Synonyms
- Acacia caffra var. campylacantha (A.Rich.) Aubrev.; Acacia campylacantha A.Rich.; Acacia catechu subsp. suma (Roxb.) Roberty; Acacia polyacantha subsp. campylacantha (Hochst. ex. A.Rich.) Brenan

= Senegalia polyacantha subsp. campylacantha =

Subspecies of legume

Senegalia polyacantha subsp. campylacantha is a perennial tree native to Africa. Common names for it are whitethorn and witdoring. It is not listed as being a threatened species. Its uses include wood and medicine.

== Uses ==
=== Repellent uses ===
The root emits chemical compounds that repel animals including crocodiles, snakes and rats.

=== Medicinal purposes ===
Root extract of S. polycantha is useful for snakebites and is applied to wash the skin of children who are agitated at night time.

=== Wood ===
The tree is good for using as firewood, but its thorns complicate its use. The tree's heartwood has a density of about 705 kg/m^{3}.
