= Entandrophragma angolense =

Conservation status
- Near Threatened (IUCN 3.1)

Scientific classification
- Kingdom: Plantae
- Clade: Tracheophytes
- Clade: Angiosperms
- Clade: Eudicots
- Clade: Rosids
- Order: Sapindales
- Family: Meliaceae
- Genus: Entandrophragma
- Species: E. angolense

Binomial name
- Entandrophragma angolense (Welw.) Panshin

Species of plant

Entandrophragma angolense, called the tiama, is a tree species with alternate, pinnately compound leaves that are clustered at the ends of branches. It is within the family Meliaceae and has a wide distribution area, occurring in moist semi-deciduous and evergreen forest regions of Tropical Africa from Sierra Leone to Uganda.

Harvesting for timber has caused the species to become vulnerable in certain countries.

== Taxonomy ==
Entandrophragma angolense was first indicated as belonging to the Swietenia family but upon a revision in 1894 by de Candolle, the species was transferred to a new genus Entandrophragma. In 2021, up to 10 taxa are placed as synonyms of the species in two database.

== Description ==
The tree can grow to a height of 60 meters and reach a diameter of 200 cm, its base often has developed buttresses that can reach a height of 6 meters, and extending as surface roots, the trunk is branchless for up to 30 meters. The grey-brown bark tends to be thin and smooth with irregular flaking in small and large pieces leaving concave or mussel-shell shaped scars, slash is pink to reddish. Leaves are paripinnately compound, up to 50 cm long and tufted at the ends of branches, 4-11 pairs of opposite leaflets per pinnae, petiole is up to 18 cm long. Leaf-blade outline is commonly oblong to obovate, 3.5–12 cm long and 2–4 cm wide, upper surface is dark green and coriaceous. Flowers are in dense panicles, clustered at the end of branches, petal is greenish white in color, flowering period is between November and February. Fruits is a large pendulous capsule, up to 22 cm long.

== Distribution ==
The species distribution is wide spread in tropical Africa, its native range is within the evergreen and semi-deciduous forest zones of West, Central and East Africa. In Eastern Africa, majorly Kenya and Uganda, occurrence is of a lower density than in Central and West Africa.

== Chemistry ==
Chemical compounds including the limonoids: 7α- acetoxydihydronomilin, 7α- obacunylacetate and Methyl angolensate have been isolated from methanol extracts of the stem bark of the species.

== Uses ==
Timber traded as Tiama mahogany, White tiama or Genu Nohur is used for cabinet making, furniture and interior and exterior joinery. This timber provides high chatoyance, with an average value above 22 PZC.

In traditional medicine, extracts of the stem bark is used to treat various gastrointestinal afflictions and a decoction is consumed to treat fever.
