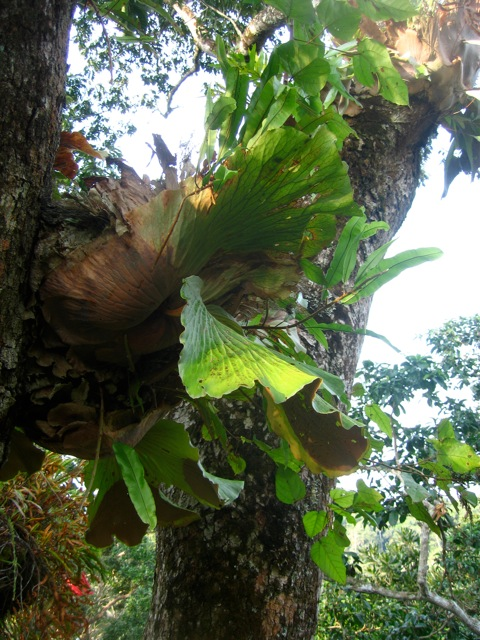
- Platycerium elephantotis on the trunk of Entandrophragma utile

Conservation status
- Vulnerable (IUCN 3.1)

Scientific classification
- Kingdom: Plantae
- Clade: Tracheophytes
- Clade: Angiosperms
- Clade: Eudicots
- Clade: Rosids
- Order: Sapindales
- Family: Meliaceae
- Genus: Entandrophragma
- Species: E. utile

Binomial name
- Entandrophragma utile (Dawe & Sprague) Sprague

Synonyms
- Entandrophragma macrocarpum A.Chev.; Entandrophragma roburoides Vermoesen; Entandrophragma thomasii Ledoux; Pseudocedrela utilis Dawe & Sprague

= Entandrophragma utile =

Species of plant in the genus Entandrophragma

Entandrophragma utile, called the sipo or utile, is a species of large tree in the genus Entandrophragma, native to nearly all of tropical Africa facing the Atlantic, from Guinea to Angola, and as far east as Uganda. The timber is traded as a tropical hardwood. It is sometimes called sipo mahogany. It shares many of the characteristics of genuine mahogany and is used as an alternative.

The timber provides high chatoyancy, with an average value above 21 PZC.

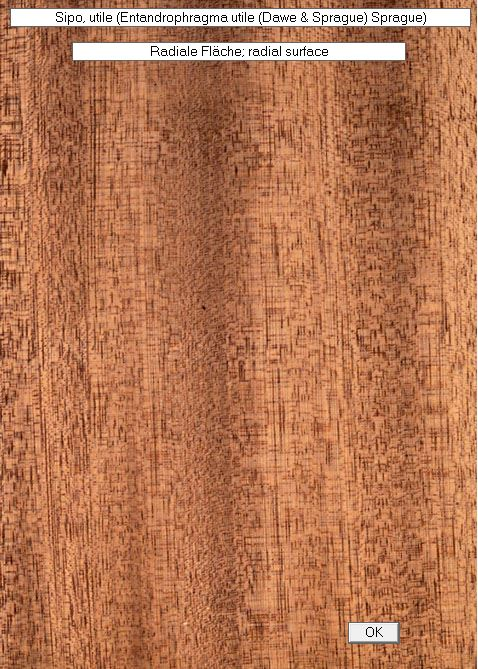
Radial surface of wood
