= Mahogany =

Timber of tropical hardwood species in the genus Swietenia

Mahogany is a straight‑grained, reddish‑brown timber produced by three tropical hardwood species of the genus Swietenia, native to the Americas and belonging to the pantropical chinaberry family, Meliaceae. The term refers specifically to wood from Swietenia macrophylla (Honduran or big‑leaf mahogany), Swietenia mahagoni (West Indian or small-leaf mahogany), and Swietenia humilis (Pacific coast mahogany). Of these, S. macrophylla is the most widespread and the only species widely grown commercially.

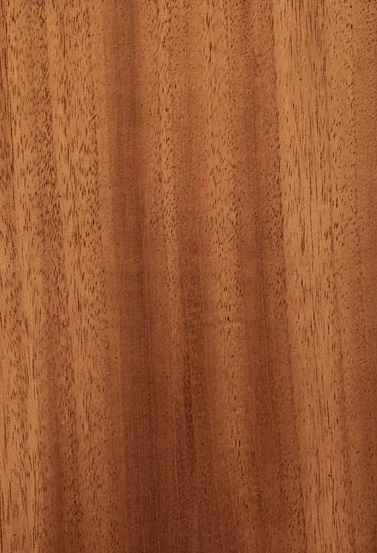
Genuine mahogany veneer showing ripple‑mark figure

Mahogany is valued for its color, durability, and workability, and is used for furniture, cabinetry, boats, musical instruments, and other high‑quality wood products. Swietenia species have been introduced widely outside their native range since the 19th century, becoming naturalized in parts of Asia, Oceania, and the Pacific. In some regions, particularly the Philippines, mahogany is considered environmentally problematic due to its ecological impacts. All species of Swietenia are listed under the CITES appendices because of concerns about overharvesting and illegal logging.

European use of mahogany began in the late 16th century, and commercial trade expanded significantly after the mid‑17th century, especially under British colonial rule in the Caribbean. By the 18th and 19th centuries, mahogany had become a major global commodity, prized in Europe and North America. Overexploitation and habitat loss eventually led to international regulation of the trade, and conservation concerns continue into the present.

== Description ==
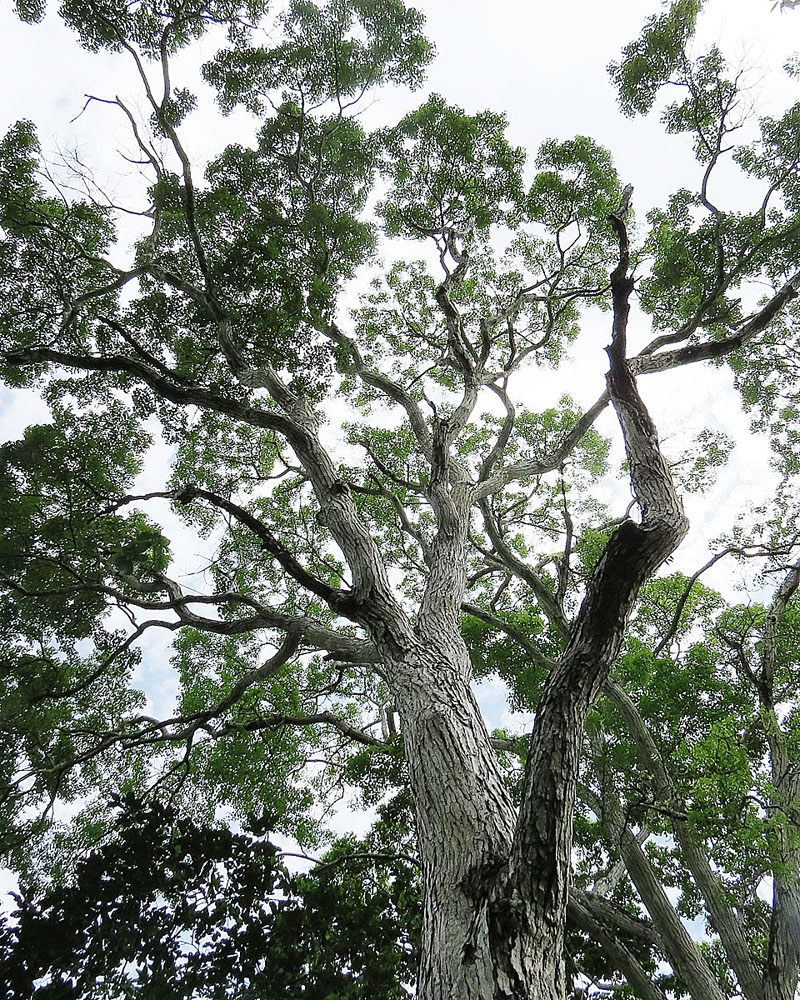
Honduran mahogany tree (Swietenia macrophylla)

Mahogany is an important timber for commercial use, prized by most people for its durability and reddish‑brown color which deepens with age and develops a warm-colored sheen when polished. It has a straight, fine, and sometimes grainy texture, and is generally free of holes, and has excellent workability. These qualities made it a favored wood for high‑quality furniture, paneling, boatbuilding, and musical instruments. It is often called "The Premier Cabinetwood of the World."

Historically, the large girth of mature trees allowed for wide boards, making mahogany a preferred wood for high‑quality furniture and cabinetry.

The density of mahogany varies by species: African mahogany ranges from 500–850 kg/m³; Cuban mahogany averages 660 kg/m³; Honduran mahogany about 650 kg/m³; and Spanish mahogany about 850 kg/m³.

== Etymology ==
The origin of the word mahogany is uncertain and debated. The term first appeared as "Mohogeney" in John Ogilby’s America (1670), describing a “curious and rich wood” from Jamaica. Early references to the tree itself date to 1731, with the first detailed description in 1743, later attributed to Swietenia mahagoni by Kemp Malone in 1940. Malone proposed that the word derived from a Bahamian term for “wood.”

F. Bruce Lamb argued instead for a West African origin, linking the term to the Yoruba word oganwo (collectively m'oganwo), used for trees of the genus Khaya, whose timber is today called African mahogany. Lamb suggested that enslaved Yoruba and Igbo people in Jamaica applied their word for tall Khaya trees to the similar Swietenia trees they encountered, producing the Portuguese mogano (attested in 1661) and eventually the English “mahogany.”

Malone criticized Lamb’s proposal as linguistically implausible, arguing that oganwo simply means “tall” and need not refer to mahogany specifically. Lamb countered that there is no evidence for “mahogany” as a generic word and maintained his African etymology.

== Taxonomy and species ==
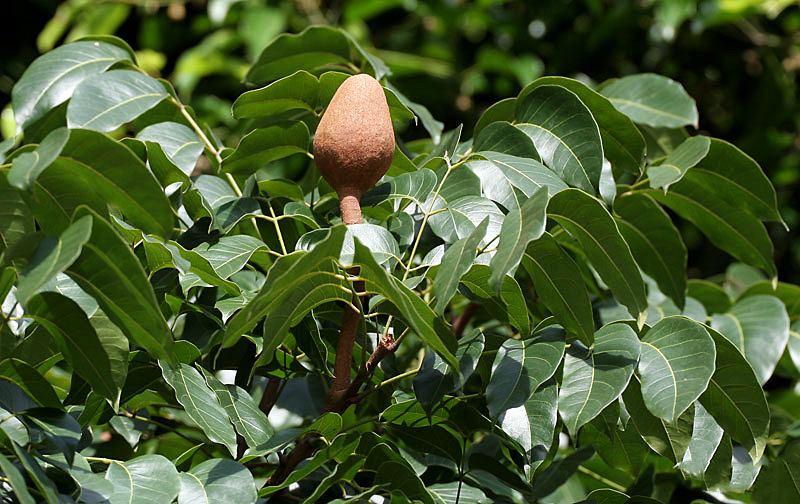
Honduran mahogany (Swietenia macrophylla) leaves and fruit

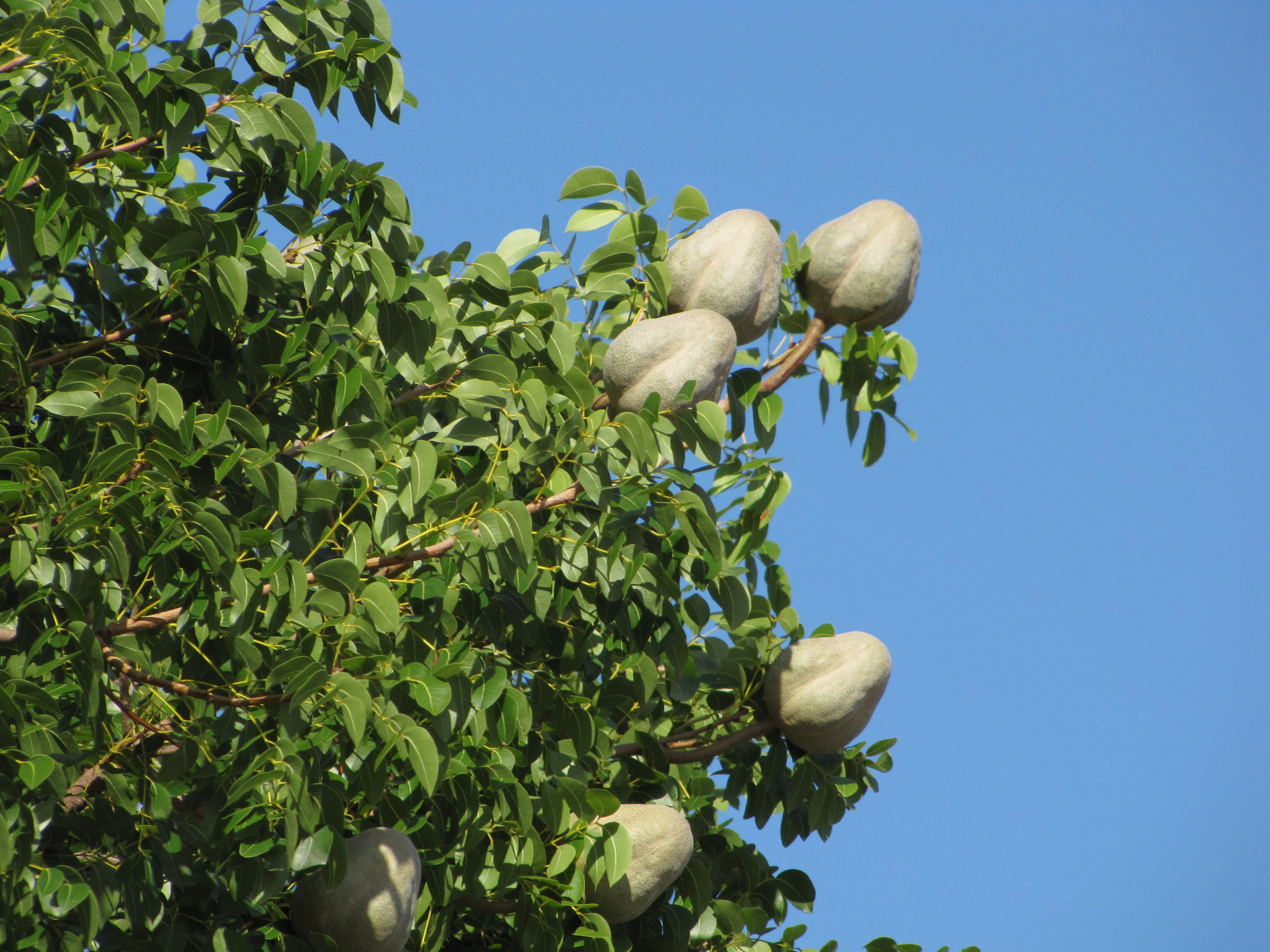
Cuban mahogany (Swietenia mahagoni) leaves and fruit

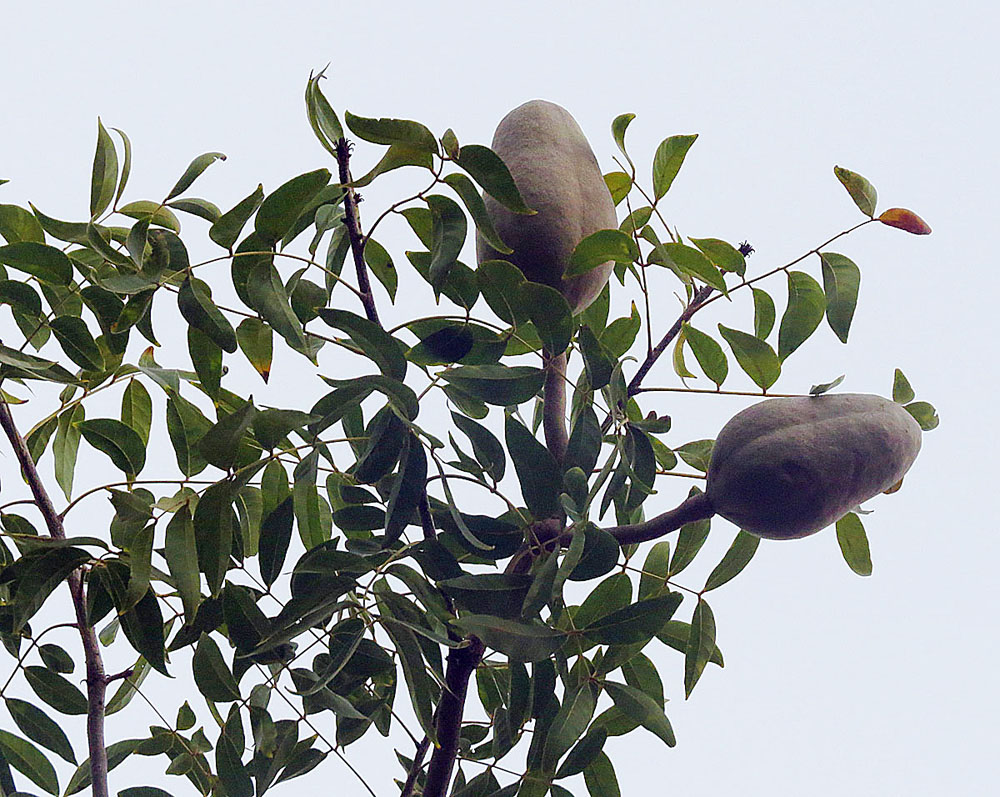
Pacific Coast mahogany (Swietenia humilis) leaves and fruit

The genus Swietenia contains three species recognized as “genuine mahogany”:

- Swietenia macrophylla — Honduran or big‑leaf mahogany, ranging from Mexico to the southern Amazon Basin in Brazil. It is the most widespread species and the only one widely grown commercially. Illegal logging and associated environmental damage led to its listing on CITES Appendix II in 2003, the first high‑volume tropical timber species to receive this level of protection.
- Swietenia mahagoni — West Indian or Cuban mahogany, native to southern Florida and the Caribbean. Formerly dominant in the mahogany trade, it has not been widely used commercially since the mid‑20th century.
- Swietenia humilis — Pacific Coast mahogany, a smaller, often twisted tree native to seasonally dry forests of Pacific Central America. It has limited commercial value, and some botanists consider it a variant of S. macrophylla.

=== Other species ===
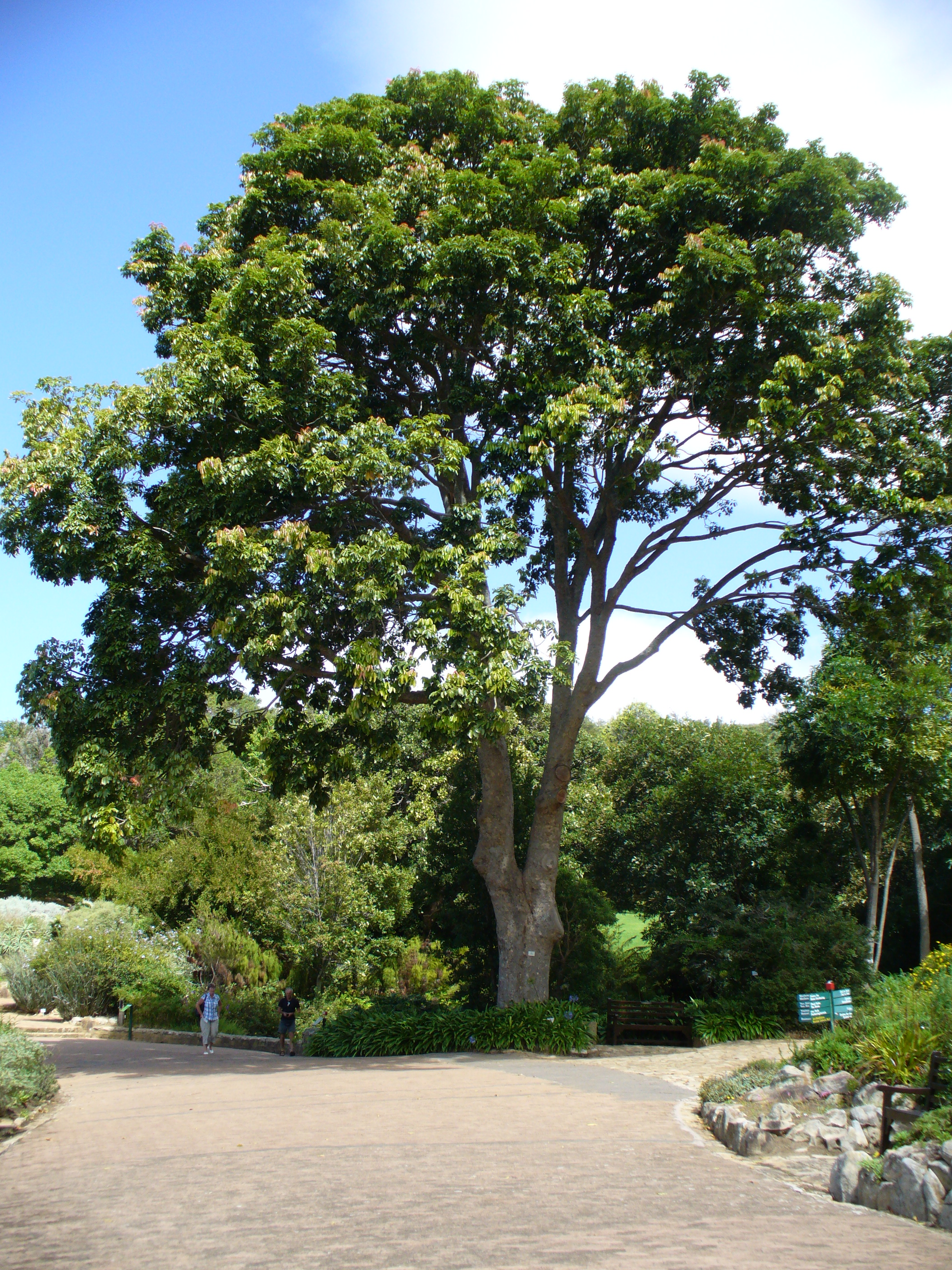
African mahogany (Khaya anthotheca)

Although only Swietenia species are considered “genuine mahogany,” the U.S. Federal Trade Commission permits certain other woods to be marketed with qualified names such as “African mahogany” or “Philippine mahogany,” reflecting long‑standing commercial usage.

- African mahogany refers to five species of Khaya native to Africa and Madagascar.
- Philippine mahogany refers to several species of Shorea and Parashorea, unrelated dipterocarps commonly known as lauan or meranti.

Other members of the mahogany family (Toona, Chukrasia, Entandrophragma, Carapa, Turraeanthus, Dysoxylum, Guarea) are sometimes called “mahogany” in various regions but cannot be marketed as such in the United States.

Numerous unrelated species also bear the name “mahogany,” including “Santos mahogany” (Myroxylon balsamum), “mountain mahogany” (Cercocarpus spp.), and “swamp mahogany” (Eucalyptus robusta).

== History ==
The name “mahogany” was originally associated with British‑controlled islands in the West Indies. French colonists used the term acajou, while Spanish territories used caoba. The indigenous Arawak name for the tree is unknown. The word first appeared in print in 1671 in John Ogilby’s America.

European use of mahogany dates to the late 16th century. A cross in the Cathedral of Santo Domingo dated 1514 is said to be mahogany, and Philip II of Spain used the wood for interior joinery at El Escorial beginning in 1584. In Spanish territories, mahogany was reserved for shipbuilding and declared a royal monopoly in Havana in 1622.

After Britain seized Jamaica from Spain in 1655, the mahogany trade expanded. By the early 18th century, British furniture makers increasingly favored mahogany for high‑quality work. The Naval Stores Act 1721 removed import duties on timber from British possessions, dramatically increasing mahogany imports into Britain. Imports rose from 525 tons in 1740 to more than 30,000 tons in 1788.

During the 18th century, Jamaica and the Bahamas were the principal sources of mahogany for Britain and its North American colonies. Additional supplies came from the Mosquito Coast (now Honduras), known as “Rattan mahogany,” and from Cuba and Hispaniola after the Free Port Act 1766 opened Jamaican ports to foreign vessels.

By the 1790s, Jamaican stocks were largely exhausted, and the market was dominated by two types:

- Honduras mahogany (“baywood”) — plentiful but often lower in quality
- Hispaniola mahogany (“Spanish” or “St. Domingo”) — preferred for fine furniture

In the 19th century, logging expanded into Mexico, Guatemala, Panama, Colombia, Venezuela, Peru, and Brazil. By the late 19th century, trade in American mahogany peaked; Britain alone imported more than 80,000 tons in 1875.

From the 1880s onward, African mahogany increasingly dominated the global market. By the late 20th century, commercial‑sized American mahogany had become scarce, prompting international conservation measures. S. humilis was listed on CITES Appendix II in 1975, S. mahagoni in 1992, and S. macrophylla in 2003.

== Trade ==
Mahogany has long been a valuable global commodity. By the late 19th century, African mahogany (Khaya spp.) began to dominate the market, and by the early 20th century it had largely replaced American mahogany in commercial trade. In 1907, Europe imported 159,830 tons of mahogany, of which 121,743 tons came from West Africa.

In the modern era, the United States is the leading importer of genuine mahogany, followed by Britain. Peru is currently the largest exporter, surpassing Brazil after Brazil banned mahogany exports in 2001.

Illegal logging remains a major issue. An estimated 80–90% of Peruvian mahogany exported to the United States is illegally harvested, with economic losses estimated at $40–70 million annually. In 2000 alone, approximately 57,000 mahogany trees were harvested to supply the U.S. furniture trade.

The US Federal Trade Commission regulates the use of the term “mahogany” in commerce, allowing only Swietenia species to be sold as “mahogany” without qualification. Other woods may be marketed as “African mahogany” or “Philippine mahogany” but must include the qualifier.

== Distribution and habitat ==
The natural distributions of the Swietenia species within the Americas are geographically distinct. S. mahagoni grows on the West Indies islands, extending north to the Bahamas, the Florida Keys, and parts of southern Florida. S. humilis is native to the seasonally dry regions of the Pacific coast of Central America, from southwestern Mexico to Costa Rica. S. macrophylla ranges from the Yucatán Peninsula southward through Central America and into South America, reaching Peru, Bolivia, and western Brazil.

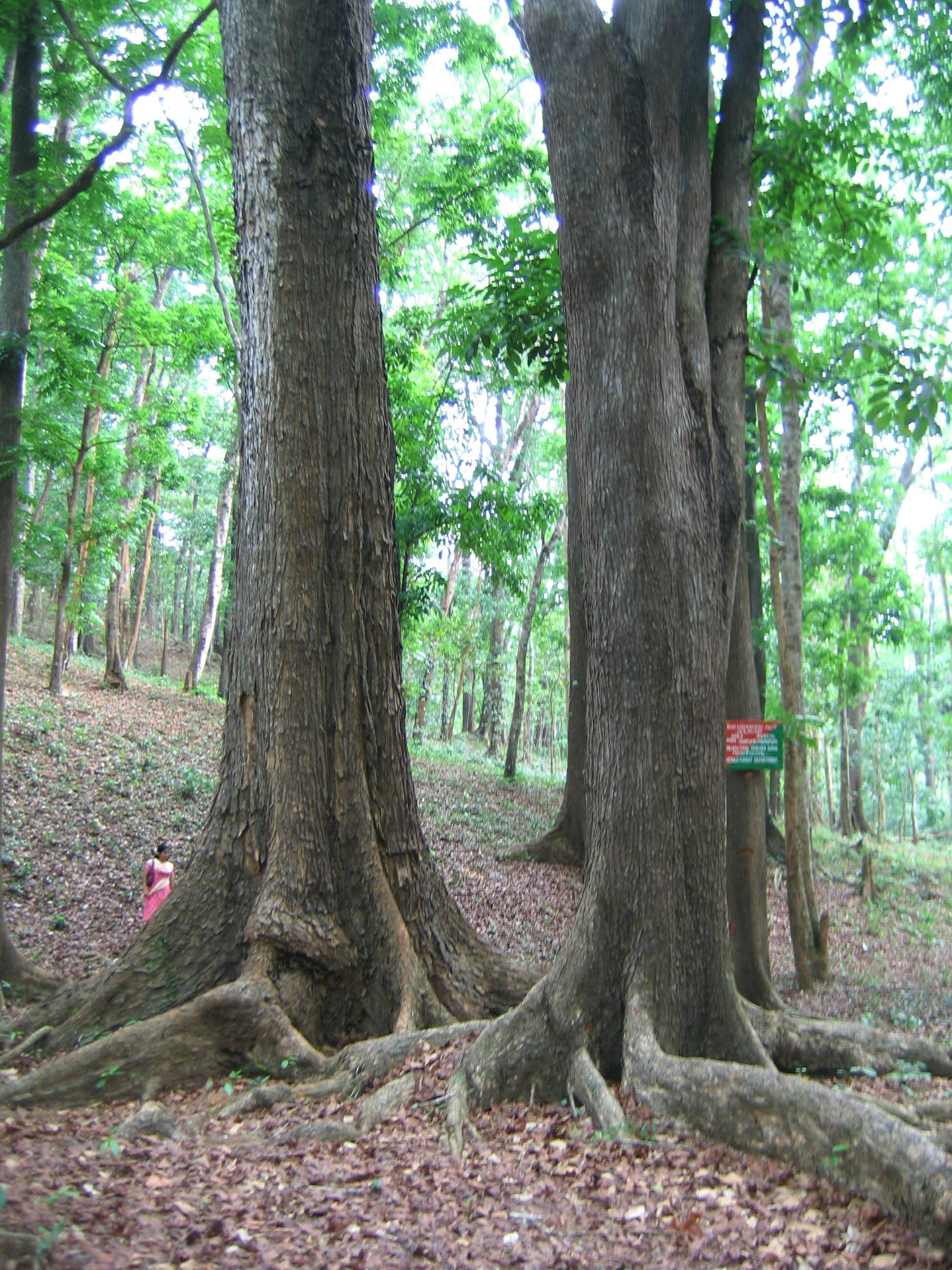
Mahogany tree in Kannavam Forest, Kerala, India

In the 20th century, some botanists attempted to distinguish additional South American species such as S. candollei Pittier and S. tessmannii Harms, but these are generally considered synonymous with S. macrophylla. Record and Hess concluded that all continental American mahogany belongs to Swietenia macrophylla King.

== Cultivation and plantations ==
Swietenia species were introduced widely outside the Americas during the 19th and early 20th centuries, often using seeds from the Caribbean and South America. Many of these plantings later became naturalized forests.

- India introduced both S. macrophylla and S. mahagoni in 1865 using West Indian seed stock; both species naturalized in some regions.
- Indonesia received S. mahagoni and S. macrophylla in 1870 via India; S. macrophylla was planted extensively from the 1920s to 1940s.
- Bangladesh introduced S. macrophylla in 1872, where it also naturalized.
- Sri Lanka planted S. macrophylla in 1897; plantations expanded after the 1950s.
- Philippines introduced S. macrophylla in 1907 and 1913, and S. mahagoni in 1911, 1913, 1914, 1920, and 1922. Planting resumed in the late 1980s as part of reforestation programs.
- Hawaii planted S. mahagoni in the early 1900s on Oʻahu and Maui, where it naturalized; S. macrophylla was planted in 1922 and also naturalized.
- Fiji introduced S. macrophylla in 1911 using seed from Honduras and Belize. Fiji developed a major plantation industry over the next century, with harvesting beginning in 2003.

== Ecology ==
Mahogany species can hybridize when grown in proximity, particularly S. mahagoni and S. macrophylla. Their hybrid is widely planted for timber due to desirable growth and wood characteristics.

In their native range, Swietenia species face significant ecological pressures. The most serious is attack by the shoot borer Hypsipyla grandella, which damages young trees and has hindered reforestation efforts throughout the Neotropics. A related species, Hypsipyla robusta, causes similar damage in Africa. These pests have contributed to the failure of many conservation and replanting programs.

Long‑term overharvesting and habitat degradation have also caused genetic loss in wild populations, reducing seed viability and resilience. Soil erosion in heavily logged areas further limits natural regeneration.

== Invasiveness ==
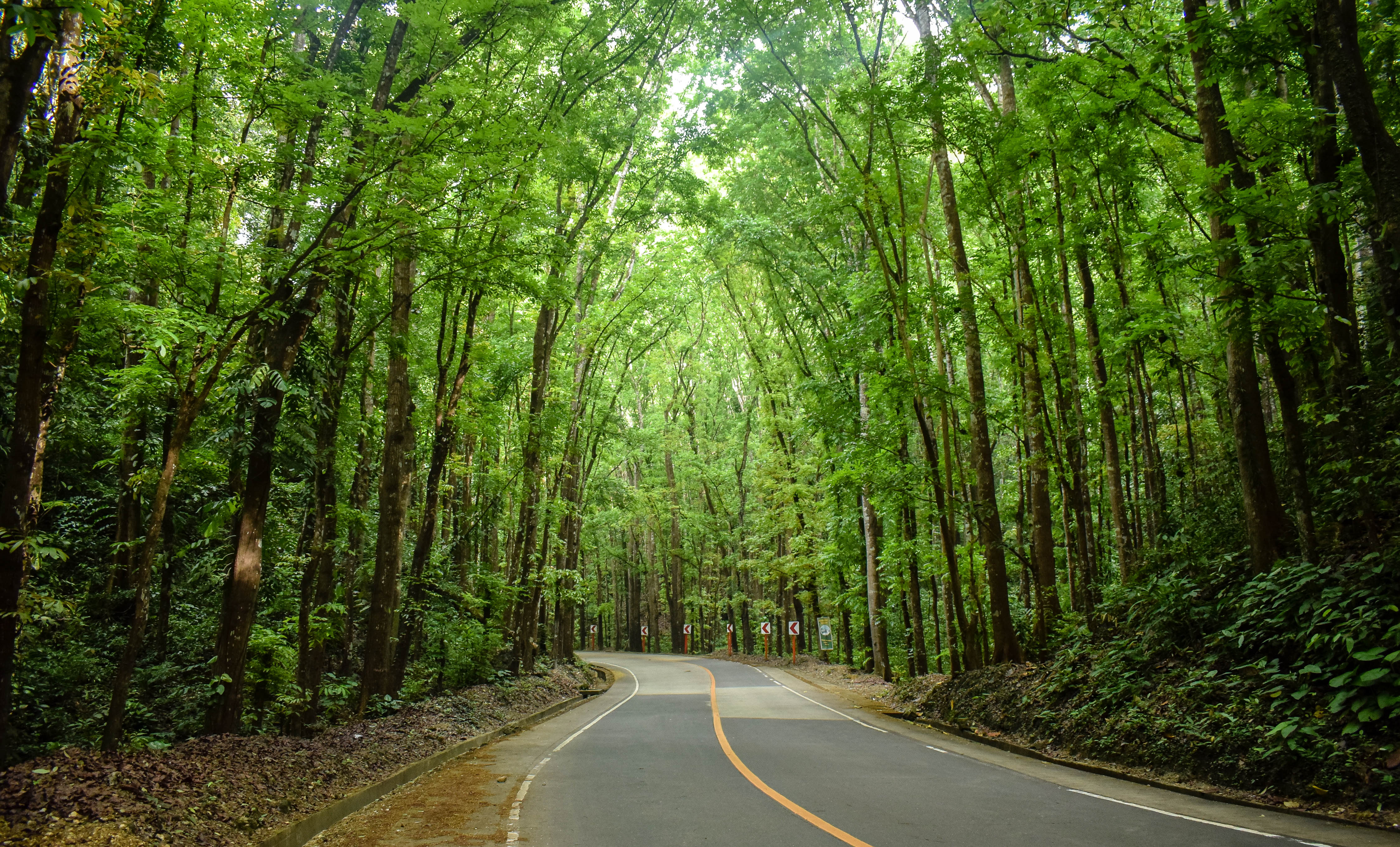
Human‑made mahogany forest in Bilar, Bohol, Philippines

In the Philippines, mahogany (primarily S. macrophylla) has been widely planted for reforestation, but environmentalists have raised concerns about its ecological impact. Critics argue that mahogany plantations may acidify soil, suppress native vegetation, and provide little benefit to local wildlife.

Mahogany’s ability to naturalize in disturbed habitats, combined with its dense shade and slow leaf decomposition, has led some ecologists to classify it as an invasive species in parts of Southeast Asia.

== Conservation ==
All species of Swietenia grown in their native ranges are listed under the CITES appendices due to concerns about overexploitation and habitat loss. S. humilis was placed on CITES Appendix II in 1975, followed by S. mahagoni in 1992. S. macrophylla, the most commercially important species, was added to Appendix III in 1995 and moved to Appendix II in 2003.

Conservation efforts in the Americas have faced significant challenges. Attempts to reestablish mahogany in its native range have often failed due to attacks by the shoot borer Hypsipyla grandella, which damages young trees and prevents successful regeneration. Similar problems occur in Africa with Hypsipyla robusta. Long‑term overharvesting has also caused genetic loss, reducing seed quality and resilience. In some regions, severe soil erosion following logging has further hindered reforestation.

Despite these difficulties, mahogany has grown successfully in many parts of Asia and the Pacific, where shoot borers are absent. Plantation management expanded throughout the 1990s and 2000s, particularly in Fiji and the Philippines, increasing the global supply of plantation‑grown mahogany. However, illegal trade in old‑growth big‑leaf mahogany from South America continues.

== Cultural significance ==
Mahogany also played a significant role in the material culture of the Caribbean and early North America, shaping furniture traditions, colonial economies, and maritime industries. Its association with luxury craftsmanship made it a symbol of status in 18th‑ and 19th‑century Europe and the United States.

As a result, mahogany holds cultural and national importance in several countries. It is the national tree of the Dominican Republic and of Belize. In Belize, a mahogany tree flanked by two woodcutters—one holding an axe and the other a paddle—appears on the national coat of arms beneath the motto Sub umbra floreo (“Under the shade I flourish”).
