= Hypsipyla ferrealis =

Scientific classification
- Kingdom: Animalia
- Phylum: Arthropoda
- Class: Insecta
- Order: Lepidoptera
- Family: Pyralidae
- Genus: Hypsipyla
- Species: H. ferrealis

Binomial name
- Hypsipyla ferrealis (Hampson, 1929)

Synonyms
- Crocidomera ferrealis Hampson, 1929

Species of moth

Hypsipyla ferrealis is a species of snout moth in the genus Hypsipyla. It was described by George Hampson in 1929 and is known from Costa Rica and Brazil (Para & Roraima).

Its larvae feed on the seeds of Carapa guianensis and Carapa procera, (Meliaceae)

The adult of Hypsipyla ferrealis is distinguished from Hypsipyla grandella by its gray hindwings, while Hypsipyla grandella has silvery hyaline hindwings.
