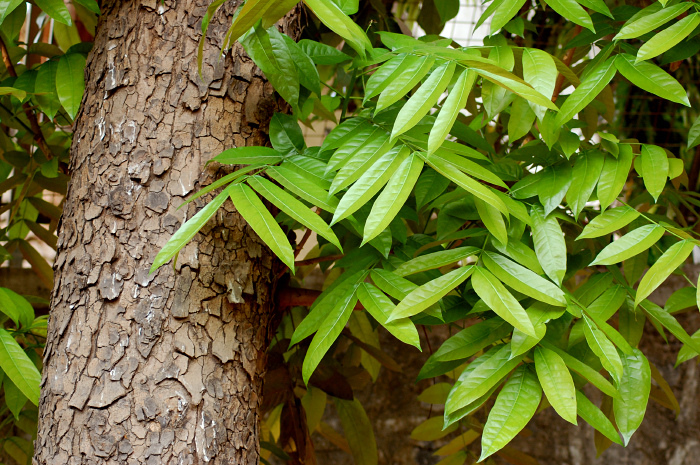

Conservation status
- Endangered (IUCN 3.1)
- CITES Appendix II (Note: Listing only includes Neotropical populations)

Scientific classification
- Kingdom: Plantae
- Clade: Tracheophytes
- Clade: Angiosperms
- Clade: Eudicots
- Clade: Rosids
- Order: Sapindales
- Family: Meliaceae
- Genus: Swietenia
- Species: S. macrophylla

Binomial name
- Swietenia macrophylla King
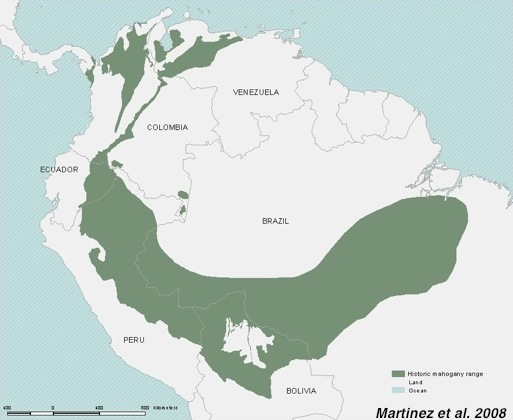
- Historic range of big-leaf mahogany in South America
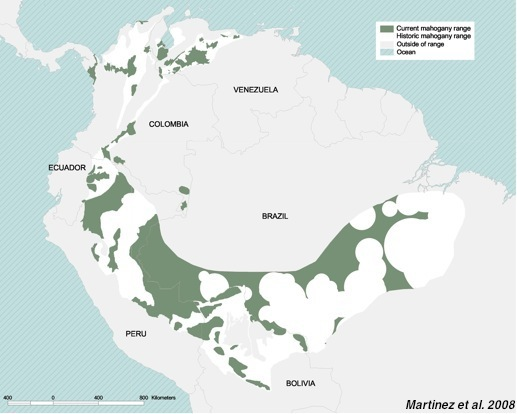
- Current range of big-leaf mahogany in South America

Synonyms
- Swietenia belizensis Lundell; Swietenia candollei Pittier; Swietenia krukovii Gleason; Swietenia macrophylla var. marabaensis Ledoux & Lobato; Swietenia tessmannii Harms

= Swietenia macrophylla =

Species of plant

Swietenia macrophylla, commonly known as mahogany, Honduran mahogany, Honduras mahogany, or big-leaf mahogany is a species of plant in the Meliaceae family. It is one of three species in genus Swietenia that yield genuine mahogany timber, the others being Swietenia mahagoni and Swietenia humilis. It is native to South America, Mexico and Central America, but naturalized in the Philippines, Singapore, Malaysia and Hawaii, and cultivated in plantations and wind-breaks elsewhere.

== Description ==
=== Wood ===
Mahogany wood is strong and is usually a source for furniture, musical instruments, ships, doors, coffins, decors.

It also provides high chatoyance, with an average value above 20 PZC.

=== Leaves ===
Honduran mahogany is characterised by its large leaves, up to 45 cm (17 in) long. The leaflets are even in number and are connected by a central midrib.

=== Fruits ===
The fruits are called "sky fruits" because of their upward growth toward the sky. The fruits of mahogany can reach 40 cm (15.7 in) in length, in a light grey to brown capsule. Each fruit capsule may contain 71 winged seeds.

=== Seeds ===
The seeds of Honduran mahogany can reach 7 to 12 cm (2.7 to 4.7 in) long.

== Timber ==
Unlike mahogany sourced from its native locations, plantation mahogany grown in Asia is not restricted in trade. The mahogany timber grown in these Asian plantations is the major source of international trade in genuine mahogany today. The Asian countries which grow the majority of Swietenia macrophylla are India, Indonesia, Malaysia, Bangladesh, Fiji, Philippines, Singapore, and some others, with India and Fiji being the major world suppliers.

== Medicinal use ==
It was scientifically studied for its various biological activities. A detailed mechanism of action of apoptotic inducing effect on HCT116 human cancer cell line was elucidated. Through solvent extraction and fractionation done on seeds of Swietenia macrophylla, the ethyl acetate fraction (SMEAF) was further examined for its neuroprotective activity and acute toxicity effects. Various purified compounds derived from Swietenia macrophylla were further examined and was revealed to possesses potent PPARγ binding activity which might capable of stimulating glucose uptake in muscle cells.

The ethyl acetate fraction from the seeds of Swietenia macrophylla (SMEAF) was studied for anti-inflammatory properties using lipopolysaccharide (LPS)–induced BV-2 microglia. SMEAF significantly attenuated the LPS-induced production of nitric oxide (NO), inducible nitric oxide synthase (iNOS), cyclooxygenase-2 (COX-2), tumour necrosis factor-α (TNF-α) and interleukin-6 (IL-6). SMEAF inhibited nuclear translocation of nuclear factor-kappa B (NF-κB) via the attenuation of IκBα phosphorylation. Moreover, SMEAF markedly suppressed phosphorylation of Akt, p38 mitogen-activated protein kinase (MAPK) and extracellular signal-regulated kinase 1/2 (ERK1/2) in LPS-induced BV-2 cells. Treatment with specific inhibitors for Akt, NF-κB, p38 and ERK1/2 resulted in the attenuation of iNOS and COX-2 protein expression. These findings indicated that SMEAF possesses anti-inflammatory activities in BV-2 cells by modulating LPS-induced pro-inflammatory mediator production via the inhibition of Akt-dependent NF-κB, p38 MAPK and ERK1/2 activation. These results further advocate the potential use of S. macrophylla as nutraceutical for the intervention of neurodegenerative and neuroinflammatory disorders.

There are also claims of its ability to improve blood circulation and skin condition, as well as anti-erectile dysfunction.

However, there are reports of liver injury or hepatotoxicity after consumption of mahogany seeds both in raw form and raw seeds grind and pack in capsule form. The severity of liver damage varies. There are also the report of single case kidney injury and polyarthralgia. In most cases, the liver function was recovered after stopping the consumption. The exact mechanism of these adverse events is currently unknown.

These cases that happened are the first reports of Swietenia macrophylla seeds' association with liver injury. This may also due to over dosage and consumption of contaminated raw seeds which are never been thoroughly investigated. Based on acute oral toxicity studies of Swietenia macrophylla seeds, the consumption of Swietenia macrophylla by humans is safe if the dose is less than 325 mg/kg body weight. The usual dose of Swietenia macrophylla prescribed in Malaysian folk-lore medicine is one seed per day.

== Population genetics ==
Mesoamerican rainforest populations show higher structure than in the Amazon.

== Common names ==
The species is also known under other common names, including bastard mahogany, broad-leaved mahogany, Brazilian mahogany, large-leaved mahogany, genuine mahogany, tropical American mahogany, and sky fruit, among others.

- English - big leaf mahogany, large-leaved mahogany, Brazilian mahogany
- French - acajou à grandes feuilles, acajou du Honduras
- Spanish - caoba, mara, mogno
- Malayalam - mahagony
- Tamil - Thenkani (தேன்கனி)
- Telugu - mahagani, peddakulamaghani
- Sinhala - mahogani (මහෝගනි)
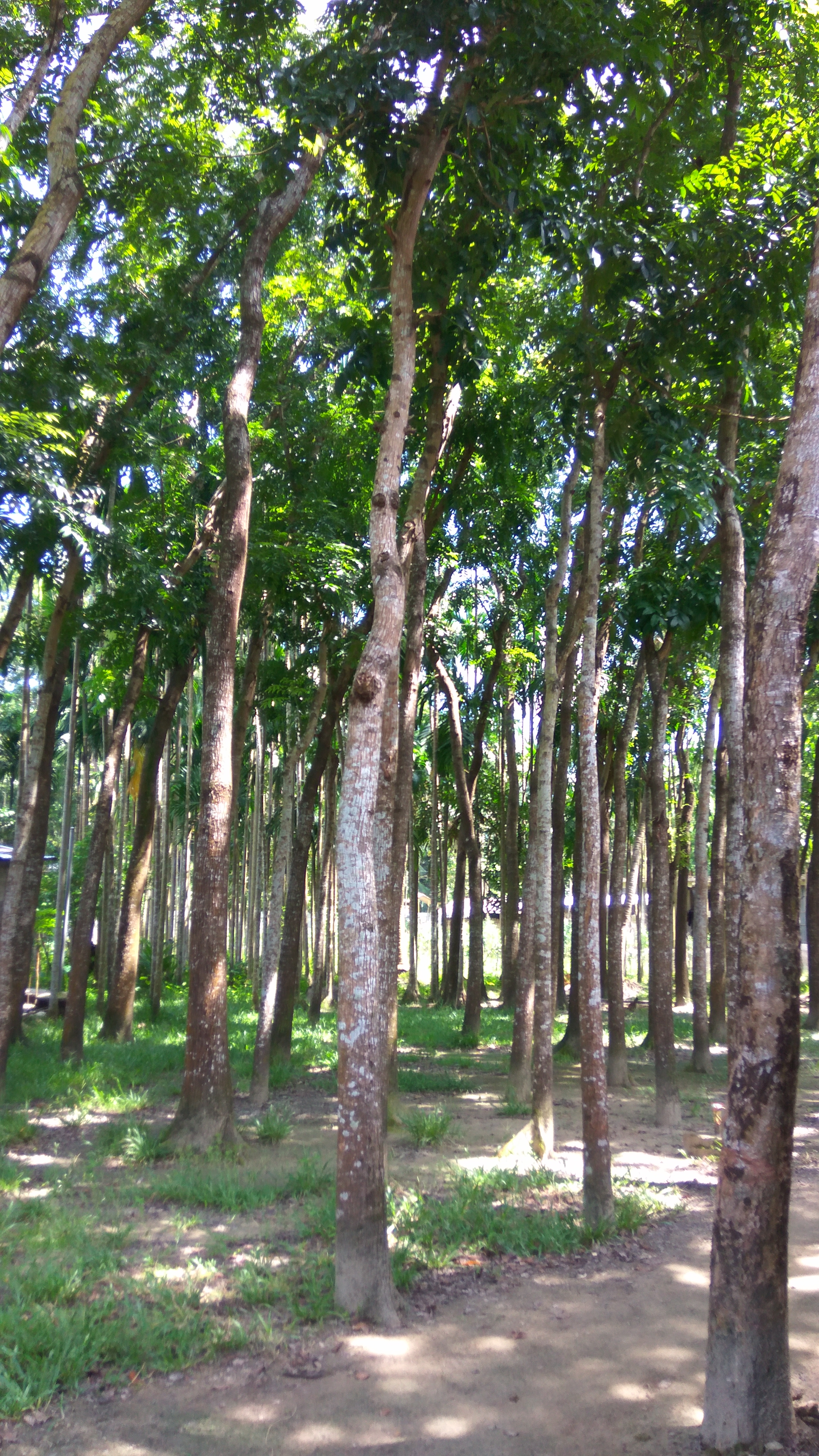
Mahogany trees

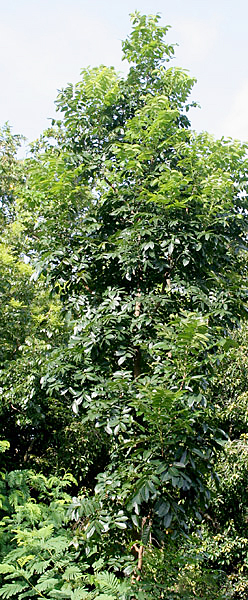
Young tree

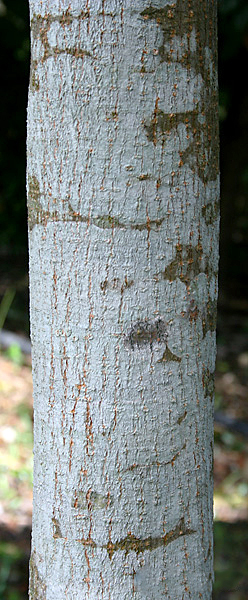
Young bark

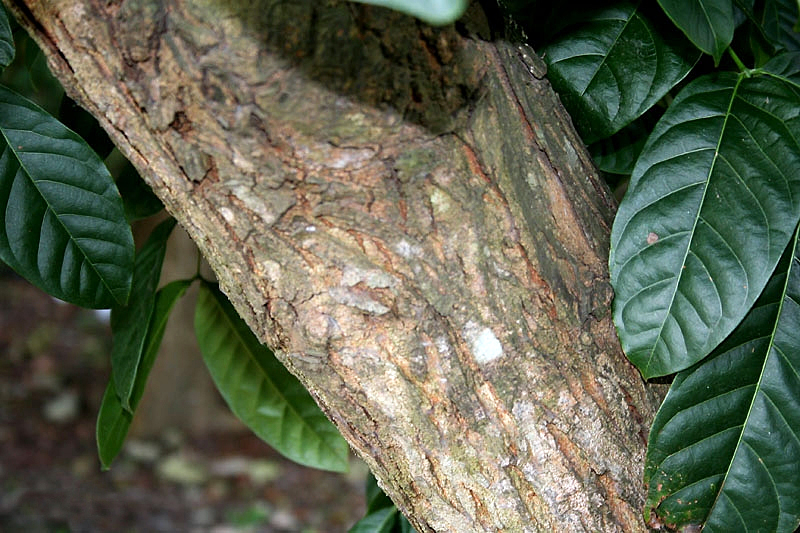
Old bark and leaves

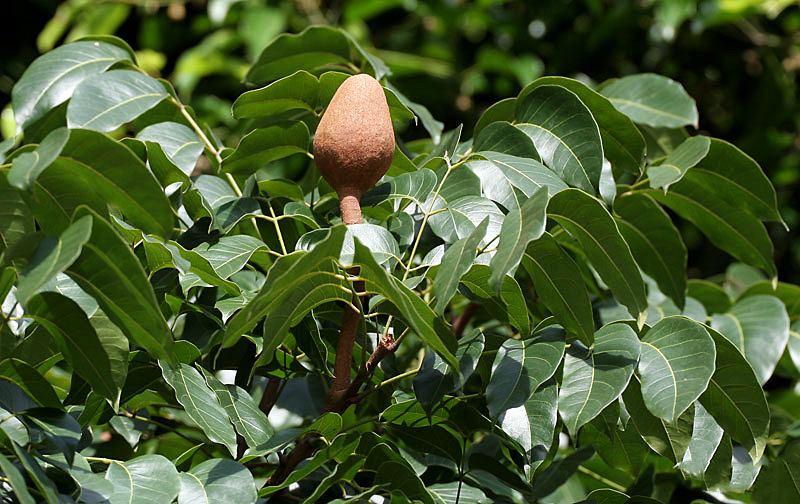
Fruit with leaves

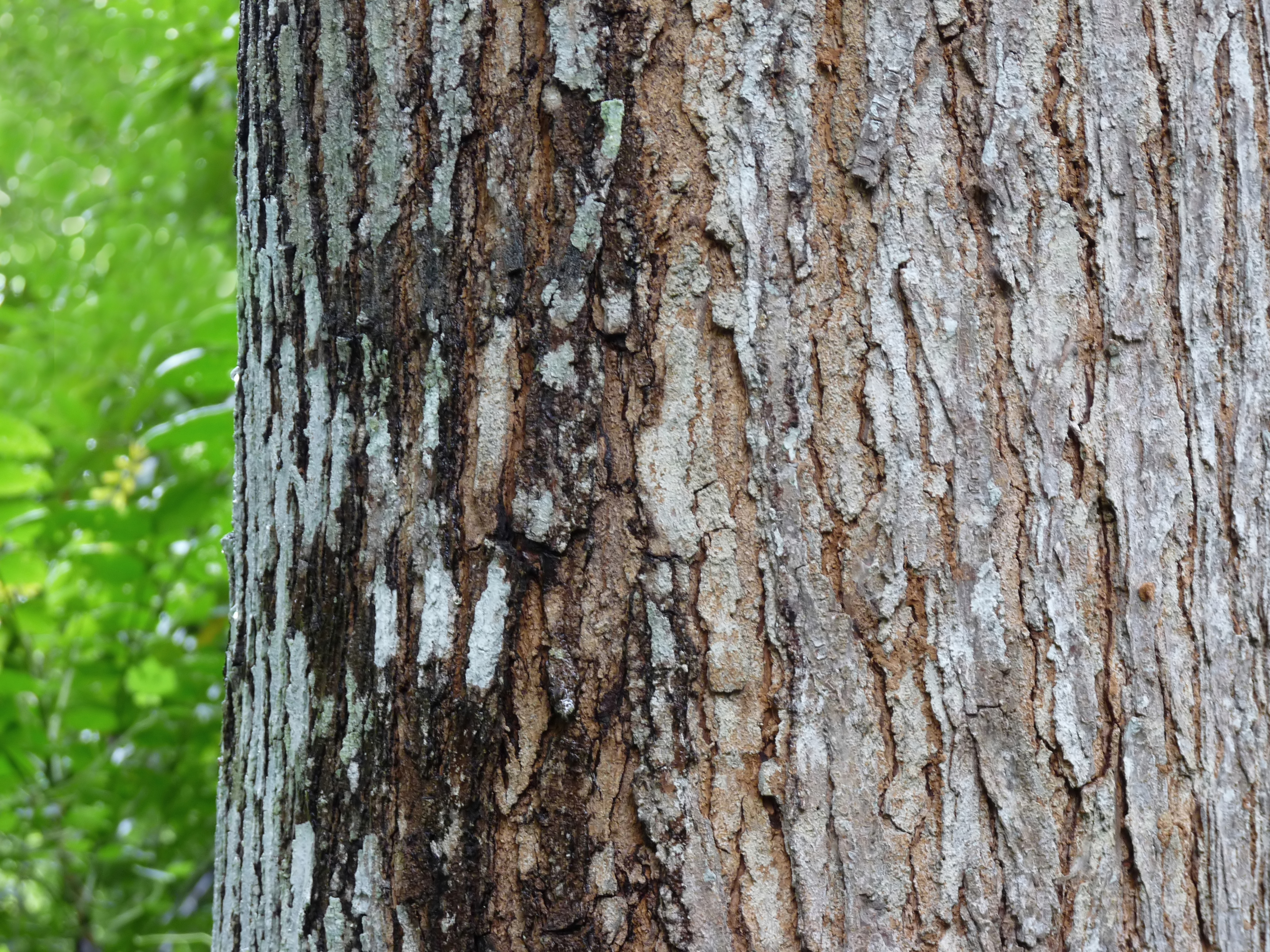
Bark pattern on mahogany tree.

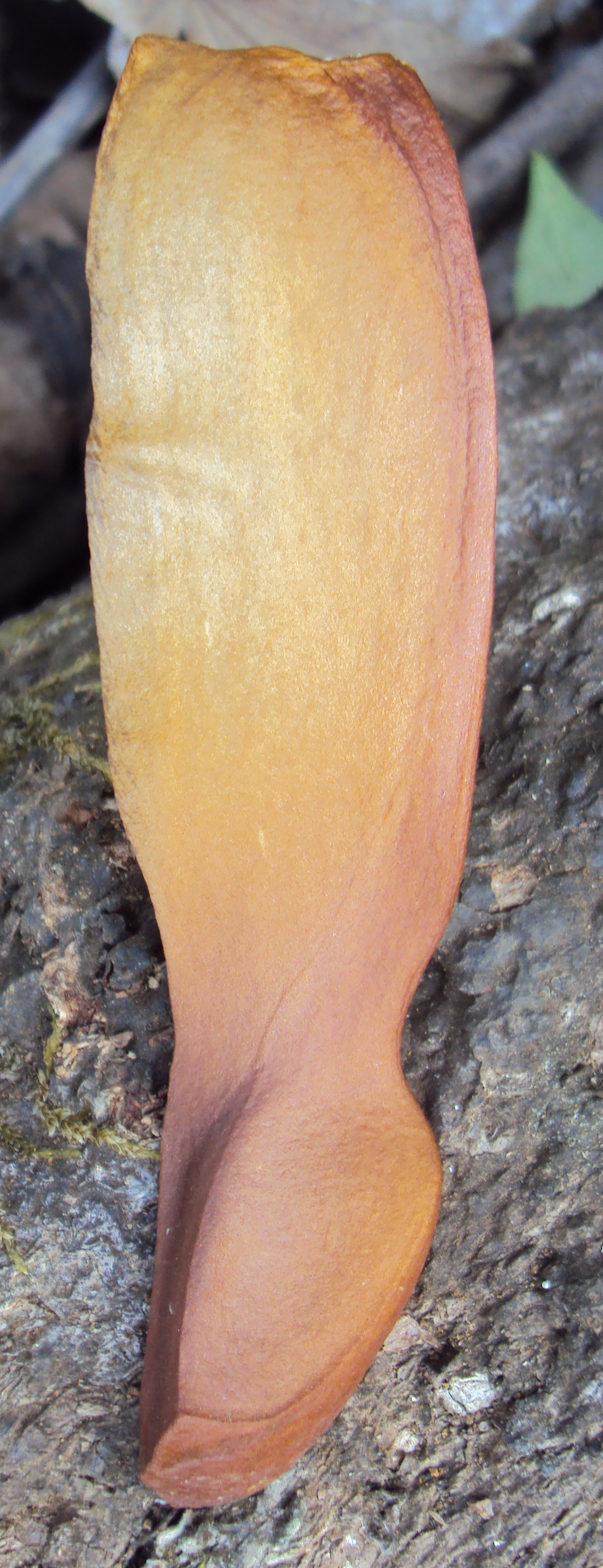
Mahogany seed.

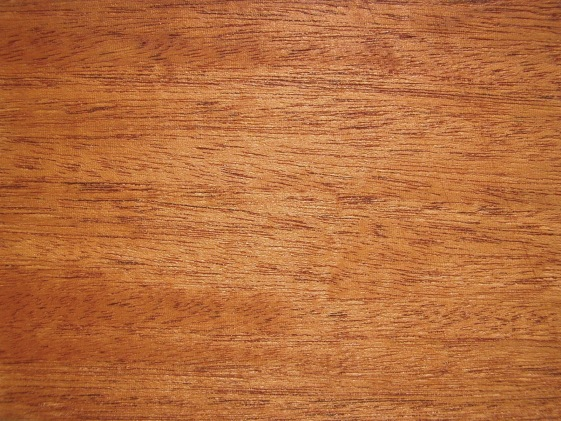
Wood

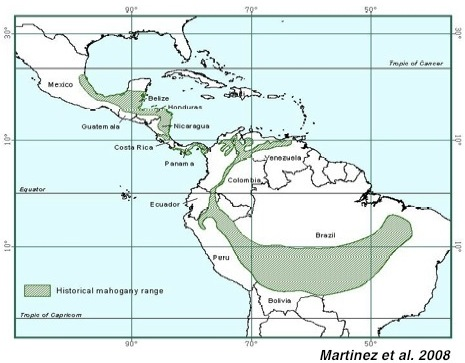
Historic distribution of mahogany from Mexico to southeastern Amazonia according to Lamb (1966). From Martinez et al. 2008.

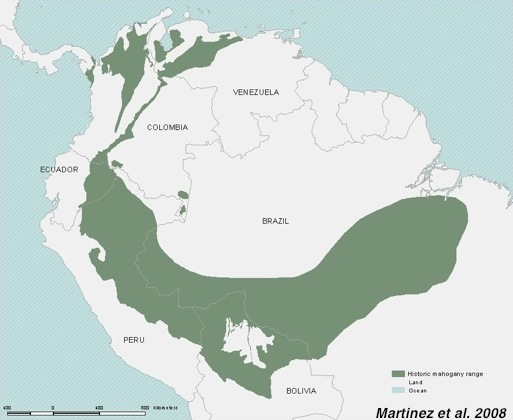
Revised historic distribution of mahogany in South America based on expert surveys. From Martinez et al. 2008.

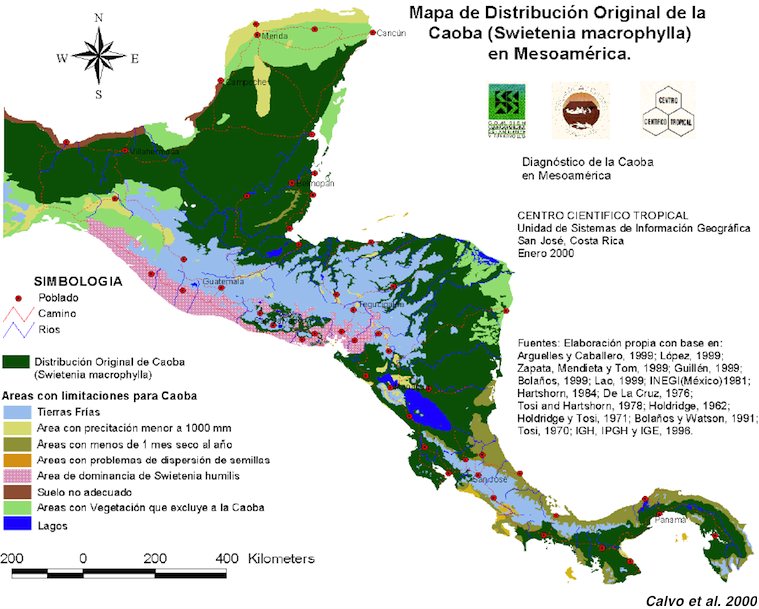
Historic distribution of mahogany in Mexico and Central America. From Calvo et al. 2000.

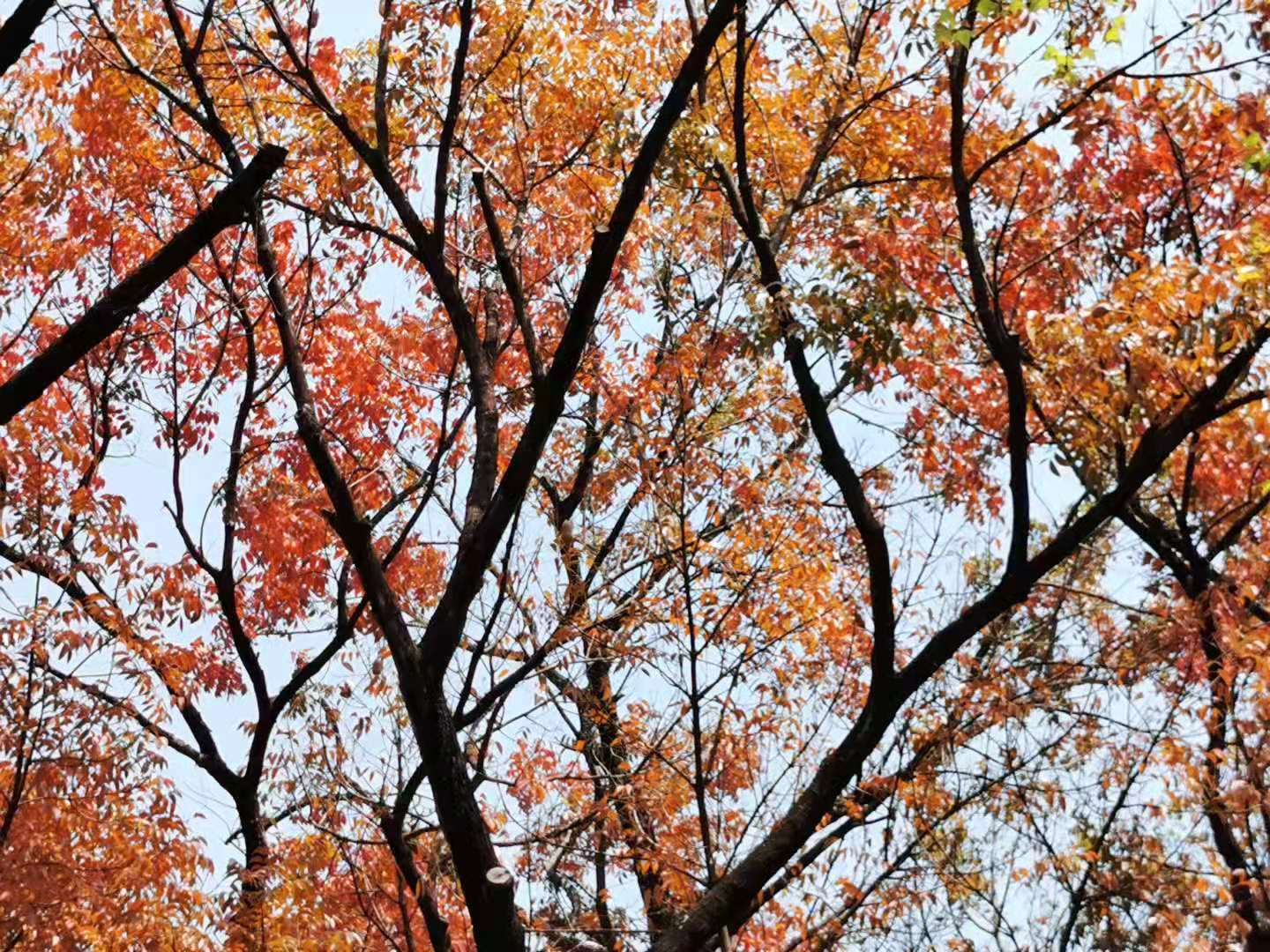
Green leaves turn red.

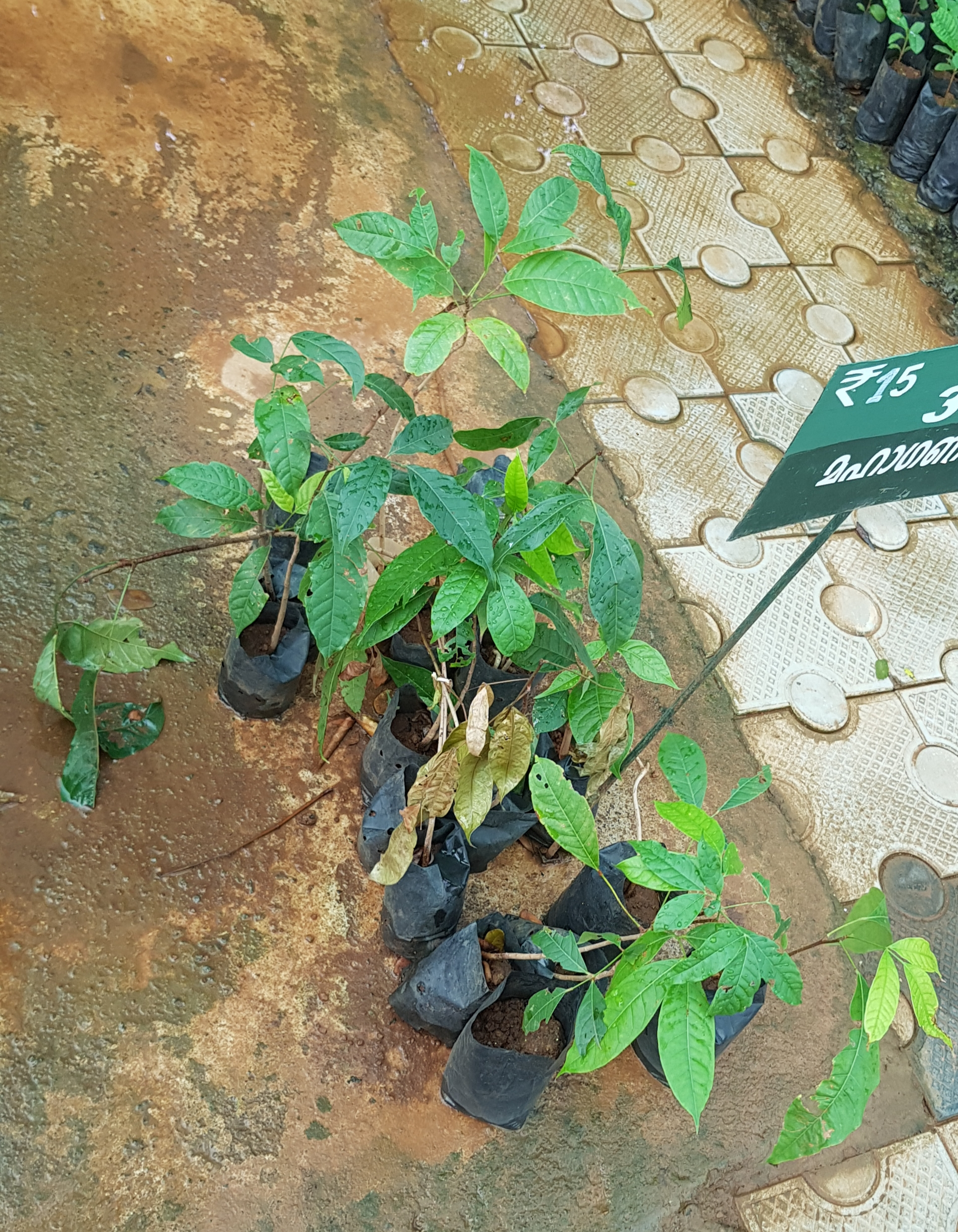
Swietenia macrophylla
