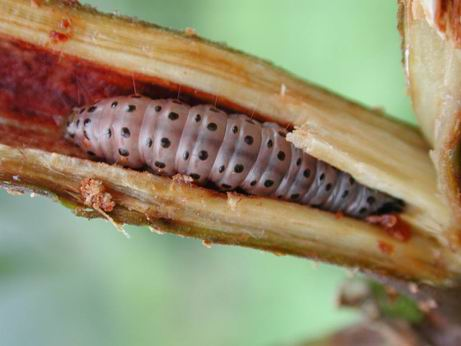

Scientific classification
- Kingdom: Animalia
- Phylum: Arthropoda
- Clade: Pancrustacea
- Class: Insecta
- Order: Lepidoptera
- Family: Pyralidae
- Genus: Hypsipyla
- Species: H. grandella

Binomial name
- Hypsipyla grandella (Zeller, 1848)

Synonyms
- Nephopteryx grandella Zeller, 1848; Hypsipyla cnabella Dyar, 1914

= Hypsipyla grandella =

Species of moth

Hypsipyla grandella is a moth of the family Pyralidae. It is found in southern Florida (United States), most of the West Indies, Sinaloa and southward in Mexico, Central America, South America except Chile and in Mauritius.

The adult of Hypsipyla ferrealis is distinguished from Hypsipyla grandella by its gray hindwings, while Hypsipyla grandella has silvery hyaline hindwings.

== Biology ==
The larvae cause damage by feeding on new shoots of mahogany (Swietenia spp.) and cedro (also known as Spanish-cedar and tropical-cedar; Cedrela spp.). H. grandella feeds on the West Indies mahoganies in southern Florida, which restricts the reproduction of the mahogany population. The insects prefer a tree that gets full sun light, and isn't being shaded by a canopy level.

The larvae are often called mahogany shoot borers, but the name may differ by country.

Its larvae are particularly abundant in the seeds of Carapa guianensis and Carapa procera, (Meliaceae)
