= Hypsipyla rotundipex =

Scientific classification
- Kingdom: Animalia
- Phylum: Arthropoda
- Class: Insecta
- Order: Lepidoptera
- Family: Pyralidae
- Genus: Hypsipyla
- Species: H. rotundipex

Binomial name
- Hypsipyla rotundipex Hampson, 1903

Species of moth

Hypsipyla rotundipex is a species of snout moth in the genus Hypsipyla. It was described by George Hampson in 1903 and is known from Sikkim, India.
