= Hypsipyla ereboneura =

Scientific classification
- Kingdom: Animalia
- Phylum: Arthropoda
- Class: Insecta
- Order: Lepidoptera
- Family: Pyralidae
- Genus: Hypsipyla
- Species: H. ereboneura

Binomial name
- Hypsipyla ereboneura Meyrick, 1939

Species of moth

Hypsipyla ereboneura is a species of snout moth, family Pyralidae. It was described by Edward Meyrick in 1939. It is known from the Democratic Republic of the Congo.
