= Hypsipyla swezeyi =

Scientific classification
- Domain: Eukaryota
- Kingdom: Animalia
- Phylum: Arthropoda
- Class: Insecta
- Order: Lepidoptera
- Family: Pyralidae
- Genus: Hypsipyla
- Species: H. swezeyi

Binomial name
- Hypsipyla swezeyi Tams, 1935

Species of moth

Hypsipyla swezeyi is a species of snout moth in the genus Hypsipyla. It was described by Willie Horace Thomas Tams in 1935. It is found on Samoa.
