= Hypsipyla debilis =

Scientific classification
- Kingdom: Animalia
- Phylum: Arthropoda
- Class: Insecta
- Order: Lepidoptera
- Family: Pyralidae
- Genus: Hypsipyla
- Species: H. debilis

Binomial name
- Hypsipyla debilis Caradja & Meyrick, 1933

Species of moth

Hypsipyla debilis is a species of snout moth in the genus Hypsipyla. It was described by Aristide Caradja and Edward Meyrick in 1933 and is known from China.
