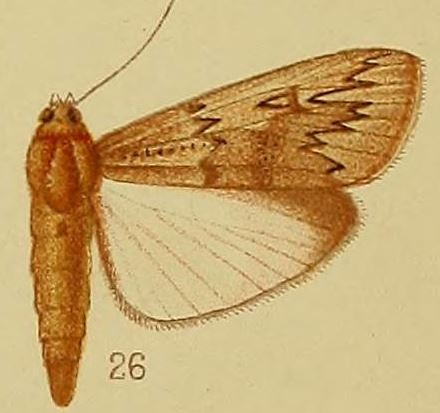

Scientific classification
- Kingdom: Animalia
- Phylum: Arthropoda
- Class: Insecta
- Order: Lepidoptera
- Family: Pyralidae
- Genus: Hypsipyla
- Species: H. albipartalis

Binomial name
- Hypsipyla albipartalis (Hampson, 1910)

Synonyms
- Mussidia albipartalis Hampson, 1910

= Hypsipyla albipartalis =

Species of moth

Hypsipyla albipartalis is a species of snout moth in the genus Hypsipyla. It was described by George Hampson in 1910 and is known from the Democratic Republic of the Congo.
