= Hypsipyla elachistalis =

Scientific classification
- Kingdom: Animalia
- Phylum: Arthropoda
- Clade: Pancrustacea
- Class: Insecta
- Order: Lepidoptera
- Family: Pyralidae
- Genus: Hypsipyla
- Species: H. elachistalis

Binomial name
- Hypsipyla elachistalis Hampson, 1903

Species of moth

Hypsipyla elachistalis is a species of snout moth in the genus Hypsipyla. It was described by George Hampson in 1903 and is known from Sri Lanka.
