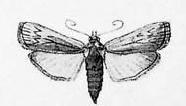

Scientific classification
- Domain: Eukaryota
- Kingdom: Animalia
- Phylum: Arthropoda
- Class: Insecta
- Order: Lepidoptera
- Family: Pyralidae
- Genus: Hypsipyla
- Species: H. robusta

Binomial name
- Hypsipyla robusta (Moore, [1886])

Synonyms
- Magiria robusta Moore [1886]; Hypsipyla pagodella Ragonot, 1888; Epicrocis terebrans Olliff, 1890; Hypsipyla scabrusculella Ragonot, 1893

= Hypsipyla robusta =

Species of moth

Hypsipyla robusta, the cedar tip moth, is a species of snout moth in the genus Hypsipyla. It was described by Frederic Moore in 1886. It is found from Africa (including Madagascar), throughout Asia (including Sri Lanka and India) to Australia. Several undescribed species or subspecies might be involved.

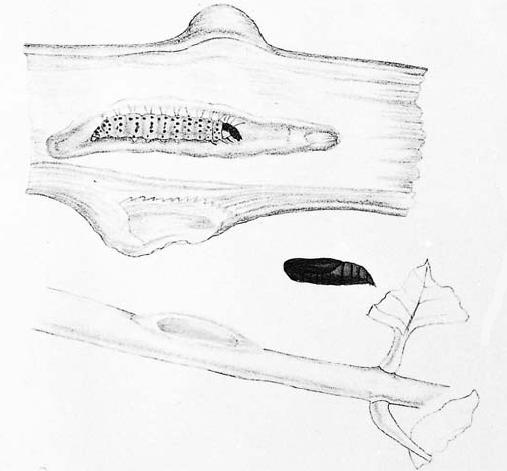
Larva, pupa and damage

The larvae attack a wide range of Meliaceae species (including Toona ciliata, Chukrasia tabularis, Swietenia species and Khaya species) and feed in shoots as well as fruits, flowers, and in bark.
