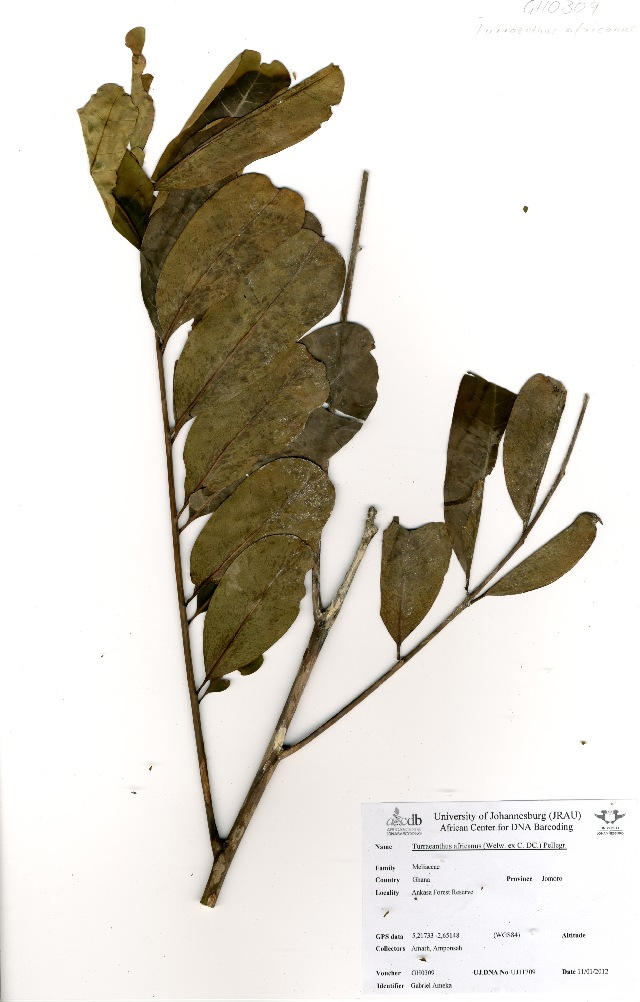
- Herbarium specimen of Turraeanthus africanus collected in Ankasa Forest Reserve, Ghana

Conservation status
- Vulnerable (IUCN 3.1)

Scientific classification
- Kingdom: Plantae
- Clade: Embryophytes
- Clade: Tracheophytes
- Clade: Spermatophytes
- Clade: Angiosperms
- Clade: Eudicots
- Clade: Rosids
- Order: Sapindales
- Family: Meliaceae
- Genus: Turraeanthus
- Species: T. africanus

Binomial name
- Turraeanthus africanus (Welw. ex C.DC.) Pellegr.

Synonyms
- Bingeria africana (Welw. ex C.DC.) A.Chev.; Guarea africana Welw. ex C.DC.; Turraeanthus klainei Pierre ex De Wild.; Turraeanthus malchairii De Wild.; Turraeanthus vignei Hutch. & Dalziel; Turraeanthus zenkeri Harms

= Turraeanthus africanus =

Species of plant

Turraeanthus africanus is a species of plant in the family Meliaceae, also known by the common names avodiré, apeya, engan, agbe, lusamba, wansenwa, African satinwood, and African white mahogany.

== Nomenclature ==
Although the species epithet given by François Pellegrin in the first publication is africana, it should be amended into masculine form, i.e. africanus per the ICN (ed. 2017, Art. 62.2 (c)): "Compounds ending in ‑ceras, ‑dendron, ‑nema, ‑stigma, ‑stoma, and other neuter words, are neuter. An exception is made for names ending in ‑anthos (or ‑anthus), ‑chilos (‑chilus or ‑cheilos), and ‑phykos (‑phycos or ‑phycus), which ought to be neuter, because that is the gender of the Greek words άνθος, anthos, χείλος, cheilos, and φύκος, phykos, but are treated as masculine in accordance with tradition."

== Description ==
The species is found in Angola, Benin, Cameroon, the Democratic Republic of the Congo, Ivory Coast, Equatorial Guinea, Ghana, Nigeria, Sierra Leone, and Uganda. The genus name is derived from the botanist Turra (1607–1688) of Padua, Italy and anthos, a Greek word meaning flower.

Turraeanthus africanus is described as a tree of the rain forest, typically 115 ft (35 m), and having a trunk diameter of 2 to 3 ft (0.61 to 0.91 m). The wood of this tree has a specific gravity of 0.48. It is commonly creamy white or pale yellow but will darken upon exposure to ultra-violet light to a golden yellow color. It has an interlocked wood grain producing various figures: striped, curly, or mottled.

== Uses ==
Avodire wood has long been valued in furniture for its naturally lustrous surface, which has led to the name African Satinwood. Commonly, the highly figured wood is used for veneers in panelling and marquetry.

A preparation from the bark of this plant is used by Baka people in southeastern Cameroon to stun fish.

== Conservation ==
It listed on the IUCN Red List as vulnerable, and is threatened by habitat loss.
