= Carapa megistocarpa =

Conservation status
- Endangered (IUCN 3.1)

Scientific classification
- Kingdom: Plantae
- Clade: Tracheophytes
- Clade: Angiosperms
- Clade: Eudicots
- Clade: Rosids
- Order: Sapindales
- Family: Meliaceae
- Genus: Carapa
- Species: C. megistocarpa

Binomial name
- Carapa megistocarpa A.H. Gentry & Dodson

Species of flowering plant

Carapa megistocarpa is a species of flowering plant in the family Meliaceae. It is endemic to Ecuador, where it is a tree of coastal forests. It is endangered by deforestation and is harvested for timber.
