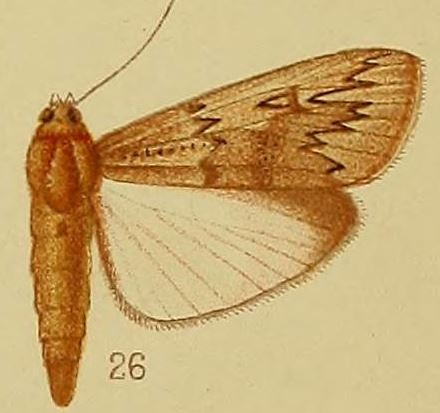
- Hypsipyla albipartalis

Scientific classification
- Kingdom: Animalia
- Phylum: Arthropoda
- Class: Insecta
- Order: Lepidoptera
- Family: Pyralidae
- Tribe: Phycitini
- Genus: Hypsipyla; Ragonot, 1888

= Hypsipyla =

Genus of moths

Hypsipyla is a genus of snout moths. It was described by Émile Louis Ragonot in 1888.

== Species ==
- Hypsipyla albipartalis (Hampson, 1910)
- Hypsipyla debilis Caradja & Meyrick, 1933
- Hypsipyla dorsimacula (Schaus, 1913)
- Hypsipyla elachistalis Hampson, 1903
- Hypsipyla ereboneura Meyrick, 1939
- Hypsipyla ferrealis (Hampson, 1929)
- Hypsipyla fluviatella Schaus, 1913
- Hypsipyla grandella (Zeller, 1848)
- Hypsipyla robusta (Moore, 1886)
- Hypsipyla rotundipex Hampson, 1903
- Hypsipyla swezeyi Tams, 1935
