= Hypsipyla dorsimacula =

Scientific classification
- Domain: Eukaryota
- Kingdom: Animalia
- Phylum: Arthropoda
- Class: Insecta
- Order: Lepidoptera
- Family: Pyralidae
- Genus: Hypsipyla
- Species: H. dorsimacula

Binomial name
- Hypsipyla dorsimacula (Schaus, 1913)

Synonyms
- Myelois dorsimacula Schaus, 1913

Species of snout moth

Hypsipyla dorsimacula is a species of snout moth in the genus Hypsipyla. It was described by Schaus in 1913, and is known from Costa Rica.
