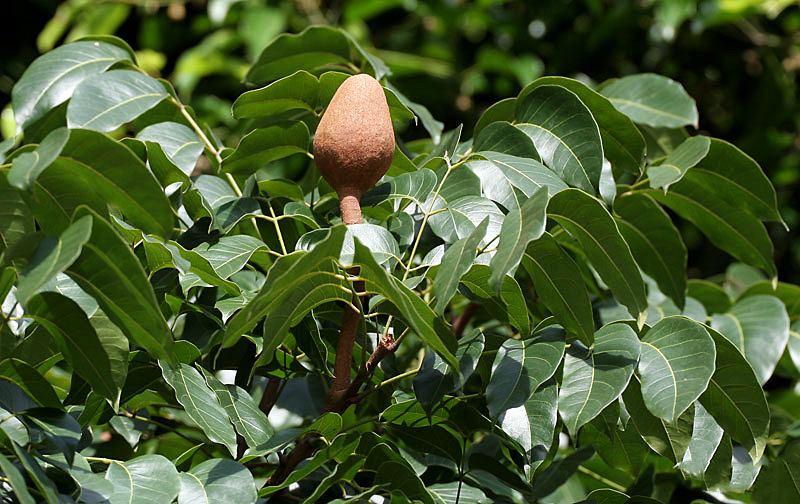
- Fruit and leaves of Swietenia macrophylla

Scientific classification
- Kingdom: Plantae
- Clade: Tracheophytes
- Clade: Angiosperms
- Clade: Eudicots
- Clade: Rosids
- Order: Sapindales
- Family: Meliaceae
- Subfamily: Cedreloideae
- Genus: Swietenia; Jacq.

Species
- Swietenia humilis; Swietenia macrophylla; Swietenia mahagoni

Synonyms
- Elutheria M.Roem.; Mahagoni Adans.; Roia Scop.; Suitenia Stokes, orth. var.

= Swietenia =

Genus of flowering plants

Swietenia is a genus of trees in the chinaberry family, Meliaceae. It occurs natively in the Neotropics, from southern Florida, the Caribbean, Mexico and Central America south to Bolivia. The genus is named for Dutch-Austrian physician Gerard van Swieten (1700–1772). The wood of Swietenia trees is known as mahogany.

== Overview ==
The genus was introduced into several Asian countries as a replacement source of mahogany timber around the time it was restricted in its native locations in the late 1990s. Fiji and India are the largest exporters of plantation mahogany and wild mahogany remains commercially unavailable to this day.

It is usually taken to consist of three species, geographically separated. They are medium-sized to large trees growing to 20–45 m tall, and up to 2 metres (6.6 ft) trunk diameter. The leaves are 10–30 cm long, pinnate, with 3–6 pairs of leaflets, the terminal leaflet absent; each leaflet is 5–15 cm long. The leaves are deciduous to semi-evergreen, falling shortly before the new foliage grows. The flowers are produced in loose inflorescences, each flower small, with five white to greenish-yellowish petals. The fruit is a pear-shaped five-valved capsule 8–20 cm long, containing numerous winged seeds about 5–9 cm long.

== Species ==
Image	Seed pods	Common name	Scientific name	Distribution
		Pacific Coast mahogany	Swietenia humilis Zucc.	Pacific coast of Central America and Mexico
		Honduran mahogany	Swietenia macrophylla King	Atlantic coast of Central America, South America south to Bolivia
		West Indian mahogany	Swietenia mahagoni (L.) Jacq.	Southern Florida, Cuba, Jamaica, Hispaniola, the Bahamas

=== Formerly placed here now in Meliaceae ===
- Chloroxylon swietenia DC. (as S. chloroxylon Roxb.)
- Khaya senegalensis (Desr.) A.Juss. (as S. senegalensis Desr.)
- Soymida febrifuga (Roxb.) A.Juss. (as S. febrifuga Roxb.)
- Toona sureni (Blume) Merr. (as S. sureni Blume)

== Uses ==
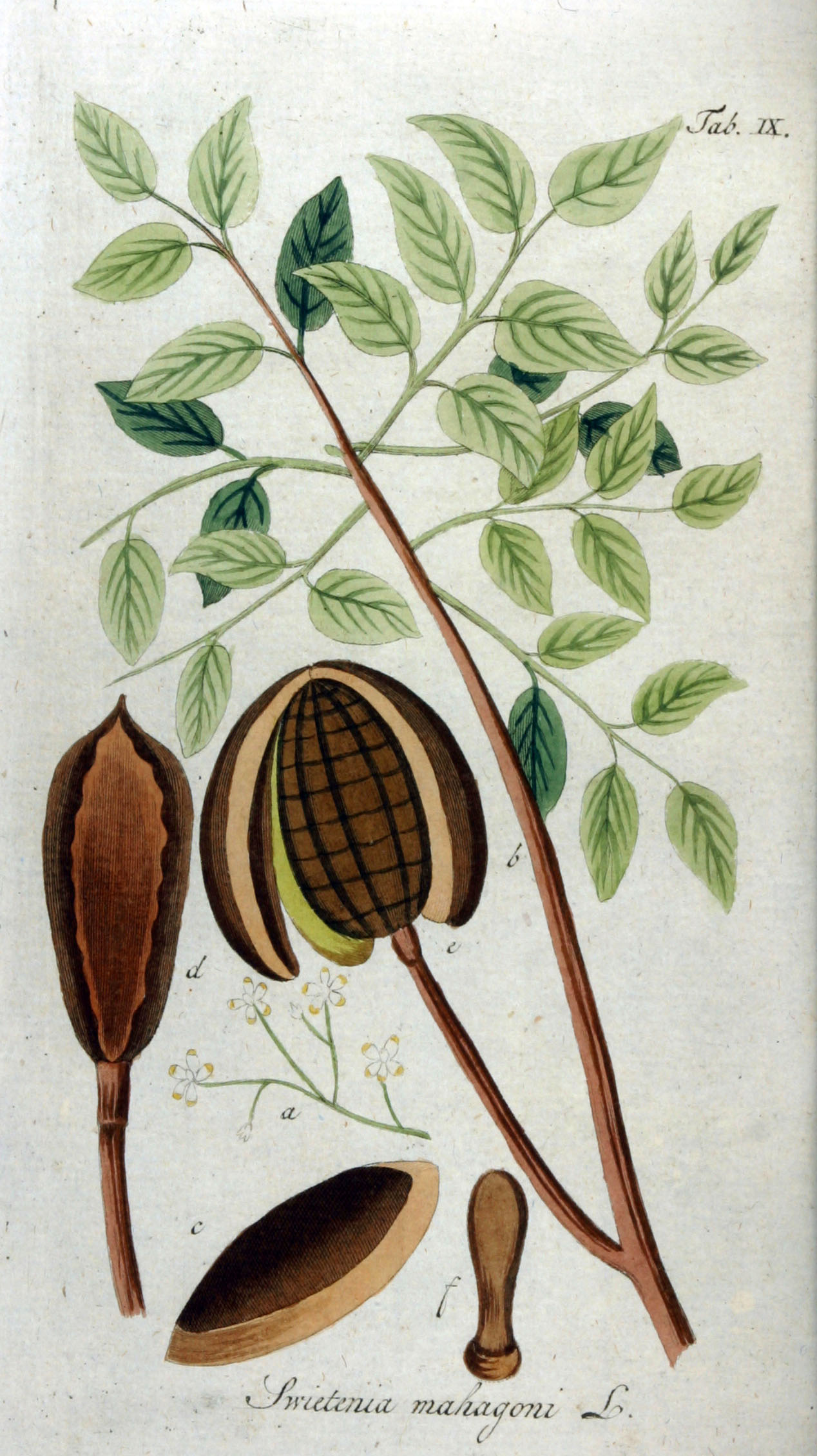
A 19th century illustration

The genus is famed as the supplier of mahogany, at first yielded by Swietenia mahagoni, a Caribbean species, which was so extensively used locally and exported that its trade ended by the 1950s. These days almost all mahogany is yielded by the mainland species, Swietenia macrophylla, although no longer from its native locations due to the restrictions set by CITES.

Trade in Swietenia grown and harvested in non-native locations such as the Asian countries Fiji, Indonesia, India, and Bangladesh is not restricted. Species of this genus are only occasionally plantation-grown in Central America, in spite of the good growing conditions and high price of the wood, due to the ubiquitous presence of the mahogany shoot borer moth (also known as the cedar tip moth), Hypsipyla grandella, which damages the form of the tree by killing the terminal shoot, causing excessive branching. Control requires extensive and frequent spraying with pesticides, rendering the genus relatively uneconomic wherever the shoot borer is present.

The fruits of Swietenia macrophylla are called "sky fruit", because they seem to hang upwards from the tree. The "sky fruit" concentrate is sold as a natural remedy that is said to improve blood circulation and skin. It is also said to have Viagra-like qualities regarding erectile dysfunction.

A somewhat comparable wood is yielded by the related African genus Khaya. This is traded as African mahogany and is from the same family as Swietenia.

== Conservation ==
All species of Swietenia are CITES-listed. Swietenia timber that crosses a border needs its paperwork in order. International environmental organizations such as Greenpeace, Friends of the Earth, and Rainforest Action Network have focused on Swietenia so as to expose illegal traffic in the wood, notably from Brazil.
