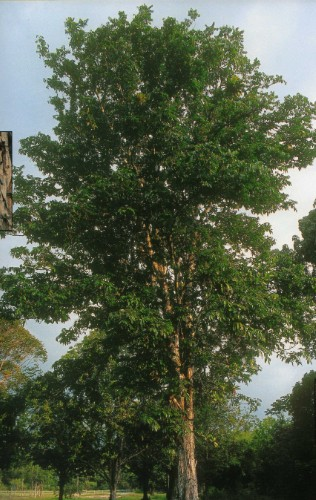

Conservation status
- Least Concern (IUCN 3.1)

Scientific classification
- Kingdom: Plantae
- Clade: Tracheophytes
- Clade: Angiosperms
- Clade: Eudicots
- Clade: Rosids
- Order: Sapindales
- Family: Meliaceae
- Genus: Carapa
- Species: C. guianensis

Binomial name
- Carapa guianensis Aubl.

= Carapa guianensis =

Species of tree

Carapa guianensis is a species of tree in the family Meliaceae, also known by the common names andiroba or crabwood.

Distribution map

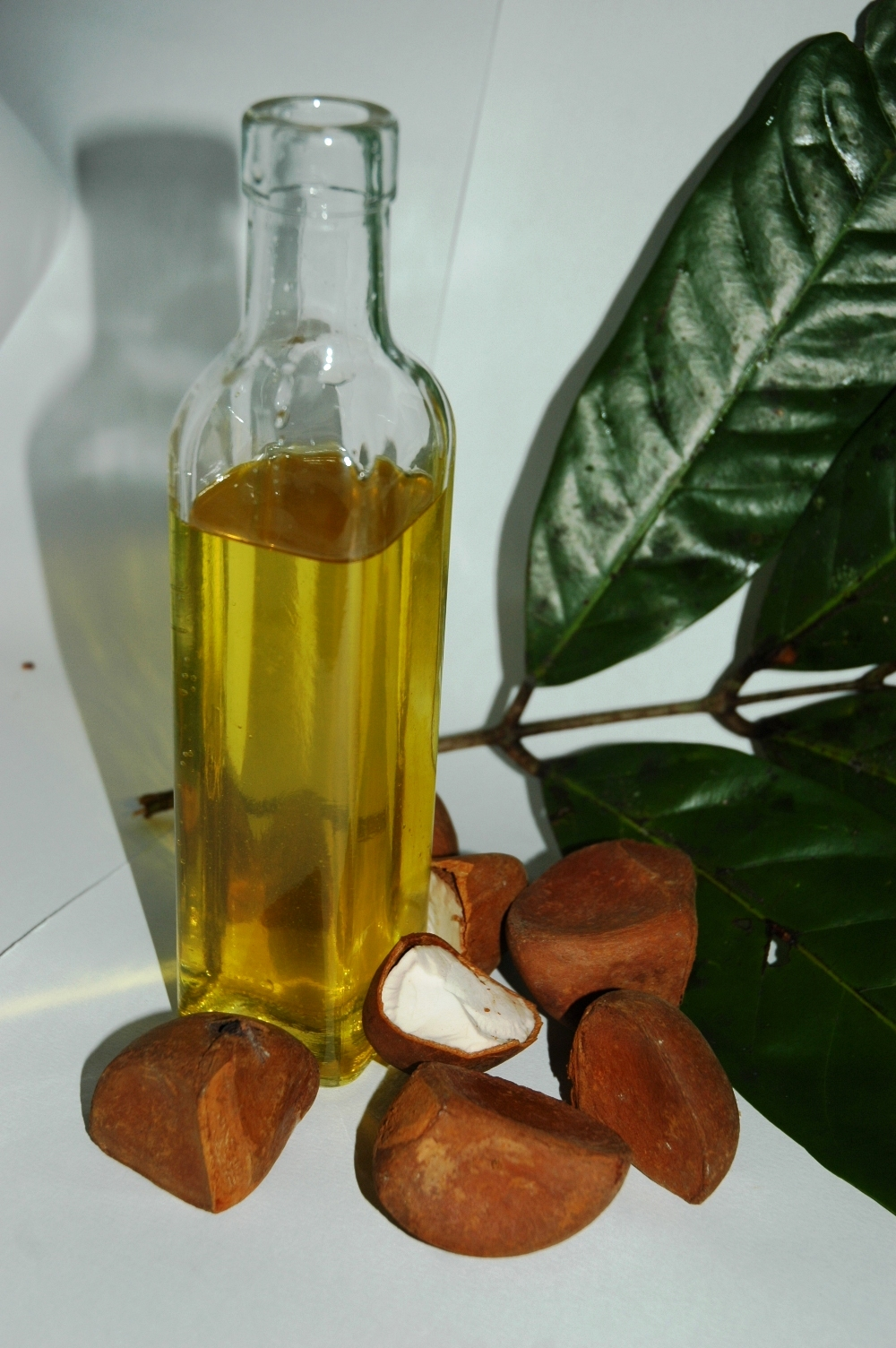
Andiroba virgin oil

== Description ==
Andiroba is native to the Amazon and is widely used by the indigenous populations of the northern region of Brazil. It grows in the Amazon region, Central America and the Caribbean. It is a tall tree with dense foliage and usually grows in the tropical rainforest along the edge of rivers.

== Uses ==
The timber is used in furniture and flooring. While the wood is not classified as genuine mahogany, it is related to the mahogany family and is similar in appearance.

The oil contained in the andiroba almond, known as crab oil or carap oil, is light yellow and extremely bitter. When subjected to a temperature below 25 °C, it solidifies, with a consistency like that of petroleum jelly. It contains olein, palmitin and glycerin.

The oil and fats of the almond are extracted and used for the production of insect repellent and compounds for traditional medicine. It is used in Brazil to protect furniture from termites and other wood-chewing insects.
