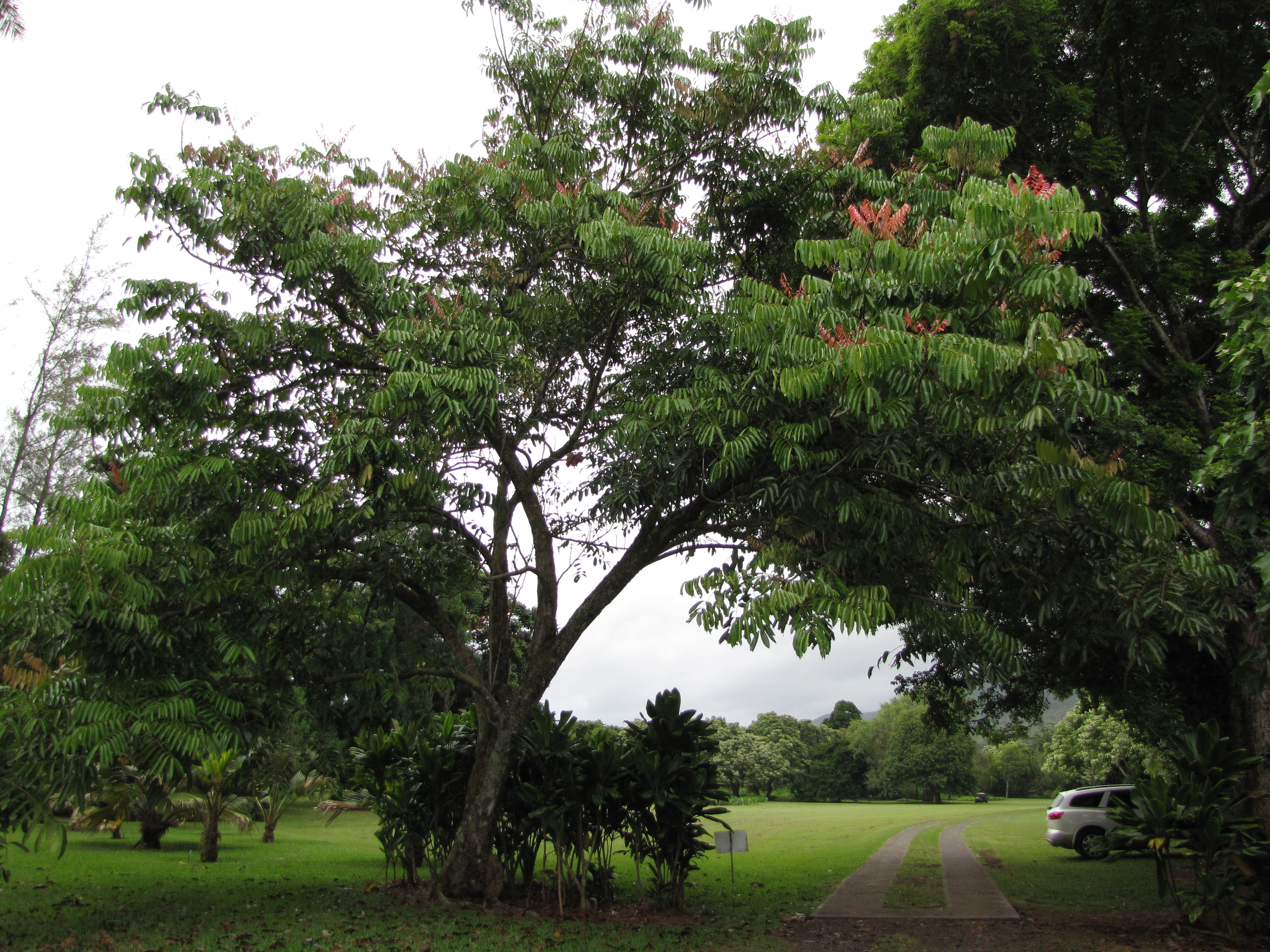
- Carapa guianensis

Scientific classification
- Kingdom: Plantae
- Clade: Tracheophytes
- Clade: Angiosperms
- Clade: Eudicots
- Clade: Rosids
- Order: Sapindales
- Family: Meliaceae
- Subfamily: Cedreloideae
- Genus: Carapa; Aubl.

Species
- See text
- Range of Carapa guianensis

= Carapa =

Genus of trees

Carapa is a genus of flowering plants in the mahogany family, Meliaceae. These are trees up to 30 meters tall occurring in tropical South America, Central America, and Africa. Common names include andiroba and crabwood.

== Diversity ==
The list of species within this genus is still under discussion. Generally recognized species are:

- Carapa guianensis (andiroba, crabwood): Amazon Region, Central America, Caribbean
- Carapa megistocarpa (tangare): Ecuador
- Carapa procera (African crabwood, kowi, okoto): West Africa, the Congos

Other proposed species:

- Carapa akuri
- Carapa alticola
- Carapa longipetala
- Carapa nicaraguensis
- Carapa vasquezii

== Uses ==
The timber is important, and oil is produced from the seeds. The name andiroba is from Nheengatu nhandi rob, meaning "bitter oil". Carapa guianensis produces an oil with similar uses to neem oil.

The oil contained in the almond andiroba is light yellow and extremely bitter. When subjected to a temperature below 25 °C, it solidifies producing a consistency like that of petroleum jelly. The oil contains olein, palmitic, stearic and linoleic acids.

Andiroba oil is one of the most commonly used medicinal oils in the Amazon. It is also used to repel mosquitoes by forming an oilseed cake into balls and burned, or mixed with annatto (Bixa orellana) and formed into a paste applied topically to protect the body from mosquito bites.

Andiroba oil is extracted from light brown seeds collected from beaches and rivers, where they float after being shed by the trees or from the forest ground.

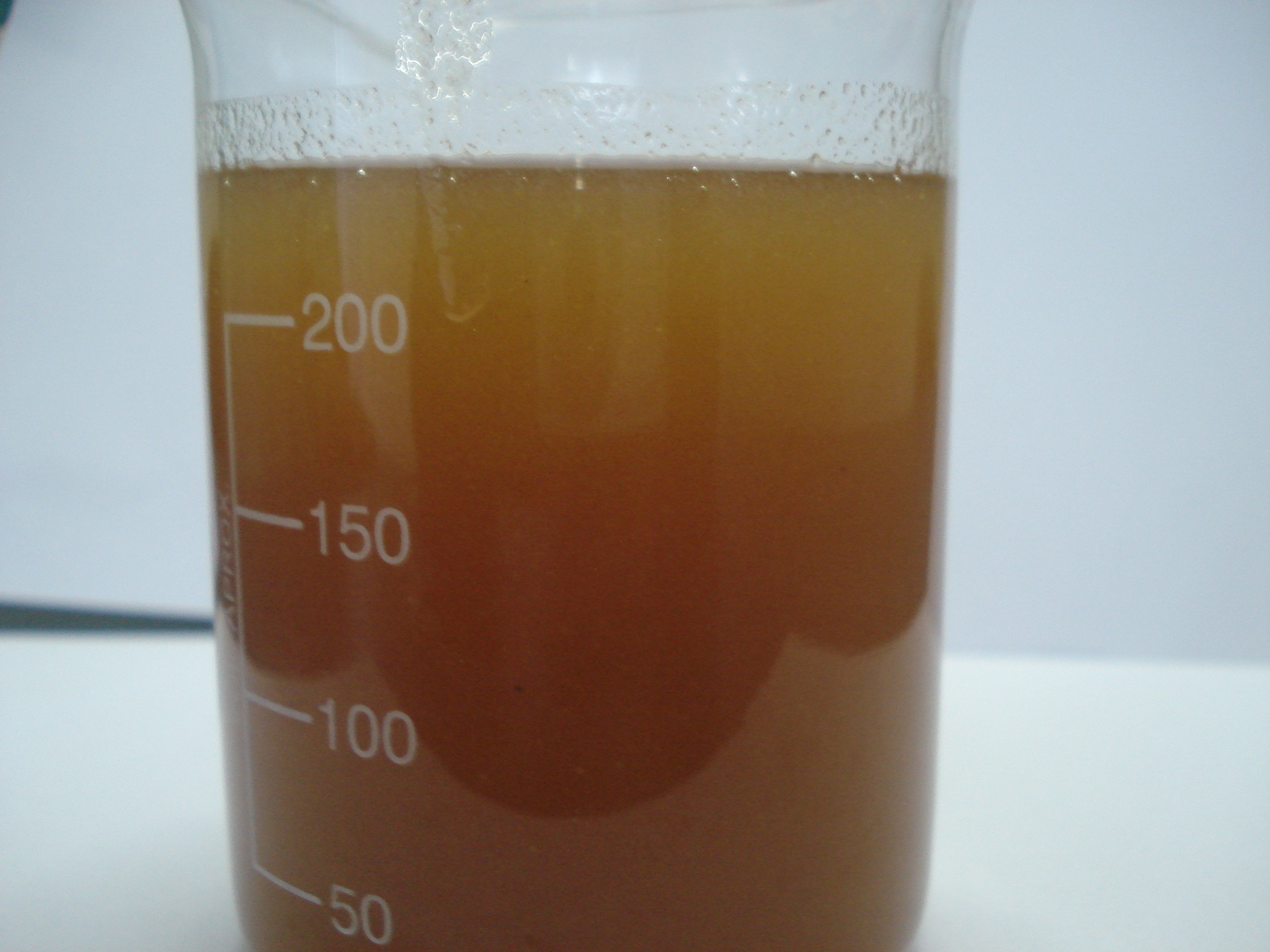
Crabwood virgin oil
