= Turraeanthus =

Scientific classification
- Kingdom: Plantae
- Clade: Tracheophytes
- Clade: Angiosperms
- Clade: Eudicots
- Clade: Rosids
- Order: Sapindales
- Family: Meliaceae
- Subfamily: Melioideae
- Genus: Turraeanthus; Baill.

Genus of plants

Turraeanthus is a genus of plants in the family Meliaceae. They are dioecious trees or treelets, with pinnate leaves. It contains the following species:

- Turraeanthus africana (Welw. ex C.DC.) Pellegr.
- Turraeanthus longipes Baill.
- Turraeanthus mannii Baill.
