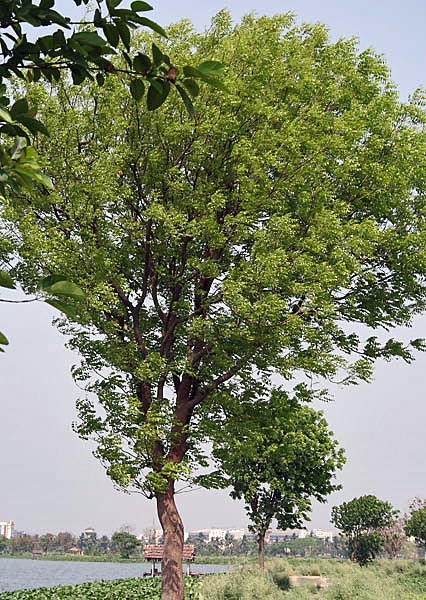
- Cultivated tree, India
- Young seedlings

Conservation status
- Near Threatened (IUCN 3.1)

- Vulnerable (NatureServe)

Scientific classification
- Kingdom: Plantae
- Clade: Tracheophytes
- Clade: Angiosperms
- Clade: Eudicots
- Clade: Rosids
- Order: Sapindales
- Family: Meliaceae
- Genus: Swietenia
- Species: S. mahagoni

Binomial name
- Swietenia mahagoni (L.) Jacq.

Synonyms
- Cedrela mahagoni L.; Swietenia acutifolia Stokes; Swietenia fabrilis Salisb.; Swietenia mahagoni var. praecociflora Hemsl.; Swietenia mahogani C. DC.; Swietenia mahogoni Lam.

= Swietenia mahagoni =

Species of tree native to Florida and islands in the Caribbean

Swietenia mahagoni, commonly known as American mahogany, Cuban mahogany, small-leaved mahogany, and West Indian mahogany, is a species of Swietenia native to the broader Caribbean bioregion. It is the species from which the original mahogany wood was produced. Swietenia mahagoni is listed as "Threatened" in the Preservation of Native Flora of Florida Act. It is the national tree of the Dominican Republic.

== Distribution ==
West Indian mahogany is native to islands in the West Indies including the Bahamas, Cuba, Jamaica, the Cayman Islands, and Hispaniola (includes the Dominican Republic and Haiti), but has widely been introduced to the rest of the Caribbean islands. It is also native to South Florida in the United States, representing the northernmost point of its range.

== Discovery and uses ==
The earliest recorded use of S. mahagoni was in 1514. This date year was carved into a rough-hewn cross placed in the Basilica Cathedral of Santa María la Menor in Santo Domingo (now the capital of the Dominican Republic), at the beginning of the building's construction. Completed about 1540, it is the oldest church in the West Indies, and its interior was ornamented with carved mahogany woodwork that is still in almost perfect condition after 500 years in the tropics.

Other records refer to the use of mahogany between 1521 and 1540, when Spanish explorers employed the wood for making canoes and for ship repair work in the West Indies. The next significant recorded use was in 1597, regarding repairs for Sir Walter Raleigh's ships in the West Indies. The first documented use in Europe of West Indies mahogany for major building structures prior to 1578 was in Spain. It was specified for use in the construction and interior decoration of one of the grandest royal residences built during the Renaissance in Europe, El Escorial. It seems likely that the merits of mahogany were already well-known and that it was used extensively, since King Philip II of Spain's advisors requisitioned it for making the interior trim work and elaborate furniture of a group of some of the most expensive buildings ever built in Europe: "When in 1578 the king ordered incorruptible [i.e. rot-resistant] and very good woods – cedar, ebony, mahogany, acana, guayacan and iron wood – sent to embellish the Excorial, they had to be brought from a distance by the slaves... Shipment of such woods was made in the summer of 1579 and others followed through a period of ten years at least."

=== Ship construction ===
Mahogany's first major use in Spain and England was for ship building, and during the 18th century it was the chief wood employed in Europe for that purpose. Mark Catesby's Natural History describes mahogany's excellence in that regard: "[Mahogany] has Properties for that Use excelling Oak, and all other Wood, viz. Durableness, resisting Gunshots, and burying the Shot without Splintering."

In his "The History of Barbados, etc", the Welsh scholar John Davies (1625–1693) refers to merchant ships prior to 1666 calling on West Indies ports to take on occasional shipments of mahogany timber: "Some masters of ships who trade to the Caribbies many times bring thence planks of this wood which are of such length and breadth that there needs but one to make a fair and large table."

Mahogany, cedar, and other woods were shipped more or less regularly from the West Indies to Spain long before 1575, for Spain at that time dominated the world and its demand for ship building timbers was enormous. Spain itself had no timber suitable for building ships and its unfriendly relations with northern Europe made drawing supplies from that source impossible; consequently it obtained timber from San Domingo, Cuba and Jamaica for building many ships of the Spanish Armada prior to 1588. A number of the largest Spanish ships were built of West Indies mahogany.

Spain turned to Cuba for supplies of timber suitable for ship masts, since the rebellion in Flanders (the Eighty Years' War began in 1566) had shut off that source. According to a passage quoted by the British naval historian, Halton Stirling Lecky, Spain continued building ships from West Indies mahogany for two hundred more years: "...Several Spanish men-of-war were captured by the British during naval battles. One of these, the Gibraltar, of 80 guns, captured by Lord Rodney off Cape St. Vincent was broken up in the royal dock yard at Pembroke, and though she must have been one of the oldest ships afloat, yet all her timbers were so sound as when they were put into her, and the whole British navy, and if I (Capt. Chaffell, secretary of the Royal Mail Steam Packet Company) am not mistaken, are now supplied with tables made out of the Gibraltar timbers. The Gibraltar was captured in 1780 and was finally broken up in 1836."

The dissemination of Clayton Dissinger Mell's 1917 monograph on the subject, "True Mahogany", resulted in the increased use of mahogany in ship construction: "It is particularly suited for planking, waterways, bulwarks, rails, skylights and companions, bitts, gangway ladders, and other deck work. With the later employment of iron, steel and teak in shipbuilding, mahogany became far more important as a furniture wood, though it is still preferred to any other wood for the framework of small sailing vessels. Large sailing vessels with mahogany framework were sold for enormous prices and manufactured into fine furniture."

During World War II mahogany was used in the construction of small boats from the 21-24 meter (70 to 80 foot) PT boats (motor Patrol Torpedo) to the small rescue boats that were parachuted from rescue planes; its use for boat construction increased from 1,350 M board feet in 1940 to 21,500 M board feet in 1943. PT boats were often made of diagonally layered 25-millimetre-thick (1 in) mahogany planks with a glue-impregnated layer of canvas in between. As a testament to the strength of this type of construction, several PT boats withstood catastrophic battle damage and still remained afloat. The most notable of those instances involved the PT-109, commanded by the young John F. Kennedy: The forward half of this boat stayed afloat for 12 hours after she was rammed by a Japanese destroyer.

The U.S. Navy Bureau of Ships approves mahogany for use in small boats and high-speed boats that require a wood easy to work, medium in weight but adequate in strength, with low shrinking, swelling, and warping characteristics, and high decay resistance. In 1966, mahogany still held an important place in the construction of yachts, launches, motorboats, and small boats of various kinds. In large ships its use is confined largely to interior trim, paneling, and furniture. In a large luxury liner, the volume for such uses may be considerable.

=== Furniture ===
The Spanish explorers were quick to appreciate West Indies Mahogany's special properties; its early importation and use in cabinetwork is attested by the 16th century provenance of some fine Spanish Renaissance pieces. Queen Elizabeth is said to have been interested in samples of mahogany brought by Sir Walter Raleigh on his return from Trinidad in 1595. Mahogany was little used in English furniture-making until the 18th century, as domestic oak and walnut were the predominant woods used. The first use of S. mahagoni in the United Kingdom for cabinet work was in 1724.

Mahogany became the essential material that led to the golden age of British furniture-making in the 18th century, which Percy Macquoid, a connoisseur of English furniture, calls the "Age of Mahogany". Furniture makers have used the wood more or less continuously since then not only in the United Kingdom, but in France, Spain and Italy as well. The Empire style of furniture featured its use extensively, and the Federal Style (1780–1830) in American furniture design is essentially a mahogany style. Mell's paper of 1917 refers to its extensive use in the early 20th century, but its importance for some purposes has diminished. Mahogany was formerly much used for the interior finish of railroad parlor cars, public buildings, hotels, and dwellings and for office fixtures.

It also was used extensively in the manufacture of fortepianos, astronomical and surveying instruments, and cases for delicate apparatuses such as scales, microscopes, and microtomes. Swietenia has a long history of being used to make boxes and cases for scientific instruments and other mechanisms, as well as furniture and ornamental woodwork.

=== Musical instruments ===
The wood from Swietenia mahagoni, as well as the other two species of Swietenia, is used to make modern musical instruments because of its superior tonewood qualities.

It is sometimes utilized in the top of guitars as well as the back, sides and neck, and is not uncommon in older mandolins.

The wood is also used in the manufacture of electric guitars such as the Gibson Les Paul models.

Three-ply laminations of mahogany, poplar and mahogany are found in top-of-the-line drum shells.

Mahogany is used for the wooden bars of marimbas.

=== Pest control ===
There has been some research into the acaricidal effects of its leaves and bark for control of the honey bee pest Varroa destructor.

== Botanical history ==
Before the American Revolution, botanists from Europe had explored and described the flora of the Carolinas, Florida, and the Bahamas. Fifty-six years before naturalist and illustrator John James Audubon was born, Volume Two of Mark Catesby's folio sized natural history was published in 1729. Catesby's hand-colored plate of the mahogany tree, along with a description in English and French (not Latin as might have been expected), was the basis for Linnaeus using his new binomial nomenclature to name it. When Linnaeus' description was published in 1758 as Cedrela mahagoni, mahogany had been well known for more than 200 years to the lumber and woodworking trades. Two years later, Nikolaus Joseph von Jacquin reclassified it and placed the West Indies Mahogany Tree into his newly created genus, Swietenia. His classification still stands.

== Characteristics ==
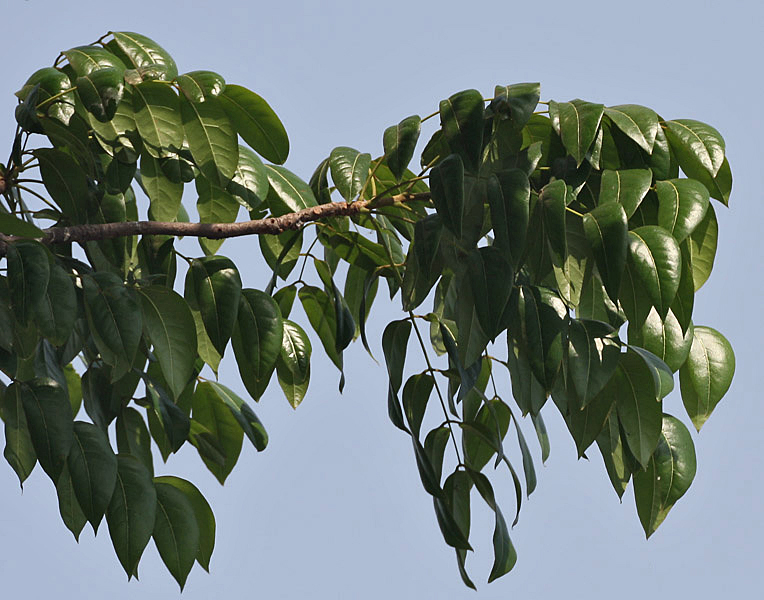
Foliage

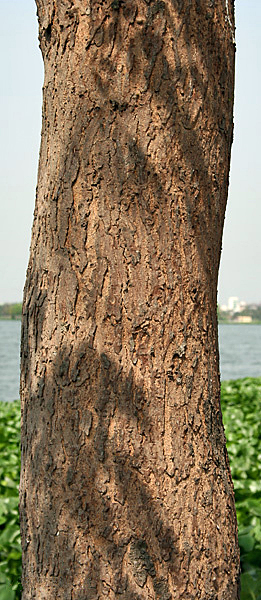
Bark

Swietenia mahagoni is a medium-sized semi-evergreen tree growing to 30–35 metres (98–115 ft) tall. The leaves are pinnate, 12–25 centimetres (4.7–9.8 in) long, with four to eight leaflets, each leaflet 5–6 centimetres (2.0–2.4 in) long and 2–3 centimetres (0.79–1.18 in) broad; there is no terminal leaflet. The flowers are small, produced in panicles. The fruit is a woody capsule 5–10 centimetres (2.0–3.9 in) long and 3–6 centimetres (1.2–2.4 in) broad, containing numerous winged seeds.

The bark in younger specimens is smooth and grayish, becoming darker and furrowed with age. In the U.S. mahoganies are semi-deciduous, losing all or most of their leaves over winter or shedding at the flush of new growth in spring. New leaves emerge blood red to pinkish, quickly becoming a bright, light green and darkening as they mature.

In the Florida Keys and south Florida, the species grows at the northern extent of its range, with individuals reaching 10–15 metres (33–49 ft) tall.

S. mahagoni has been found to exhibit strong wind resistance, frequently surviving major hurricanes.

== Cultivation and protection ==
Supplies of S. mahagoni are very rare due to historic over-harvesting, and most mahogany marketed now comes from other related species, often with faster growth but of lower wood quality.

It is also grown as an ornamental tree in subtropical and tropical regions. In Florida, it is grown as a street tree and a shade tree.

=== U.S. Federal Experimental Forest ===
Since 1954 the United States government has owned and maintained a 147-acre observation plot of secondary growth S. mahagoni at Estate Thomas on St. Croix, United States Virgin Islands. It is managed jointly by the International Institute of Tropical Forestry with an adjoining privately owned tree farm at Estate Bellevue which belongs to the testamentary estate of Dr. Richard Marshall Bond, a biologist who supervised the establishment of the federal tree farm at Estate Thomas.

=== Legal protection ===
West Indian mahogany is native to southern Florida, and is protected by state, federal and international conservation laws. The species is nationally protected both in Cuba and the Dominican Republic.

Among various provisions, the Lacey Act of 1900 prohibits trade in plants that have been illegally taken, transported or sold, and requires a documented chain of possession for plant products sold in the United States. The Convention on International Trade in Endangered Species of Wild Fauna and Flora (CITES) lists S. mahagoni in Appendix II (only saw-logs, sawn wood and veneers). The International Union for Conservation of Nature (IUCN) classifies S. mahogani as Near Threatened. National assessments marked S. mahagoni as Least Concern in Cuba, Critically Endangered in the Cayman Islands, and Vulnerable in the Dominican Republic. NatureServe considers S. mahagoni to be Vulnerable in Florida. S. mahagoni is also listed as "Threatened" in the Preservation of Native Flora of Florida Act.
