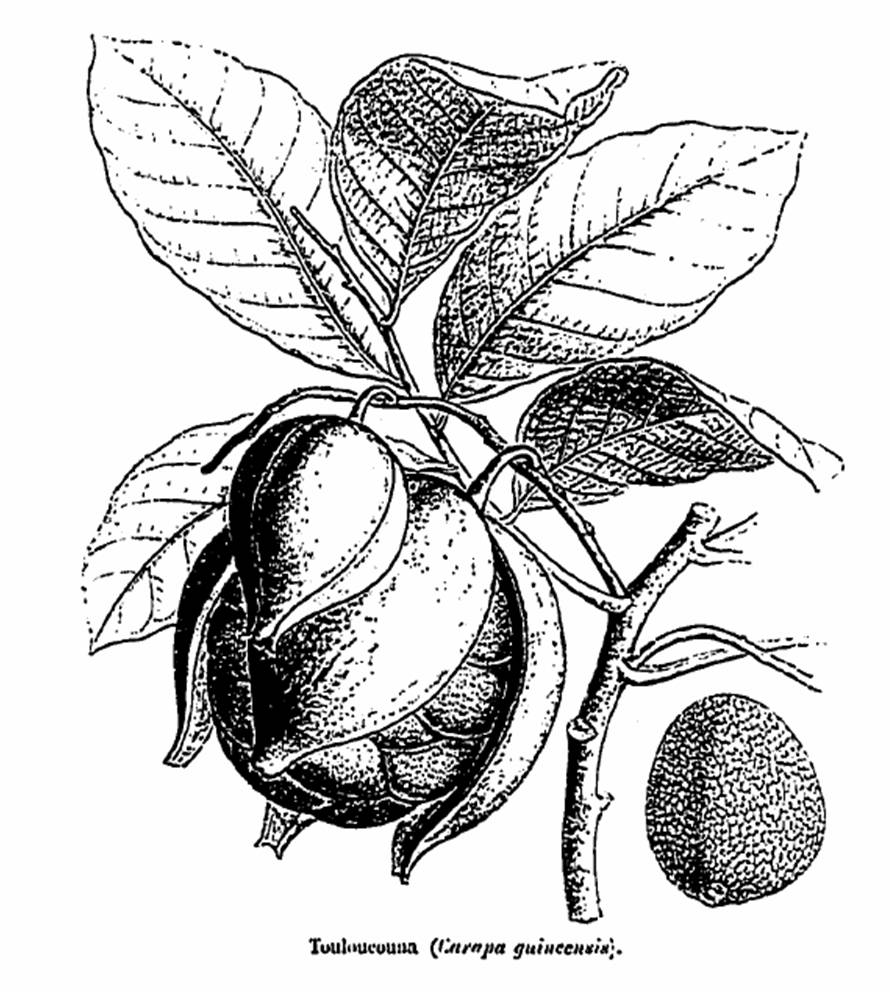
- Botanical illustration
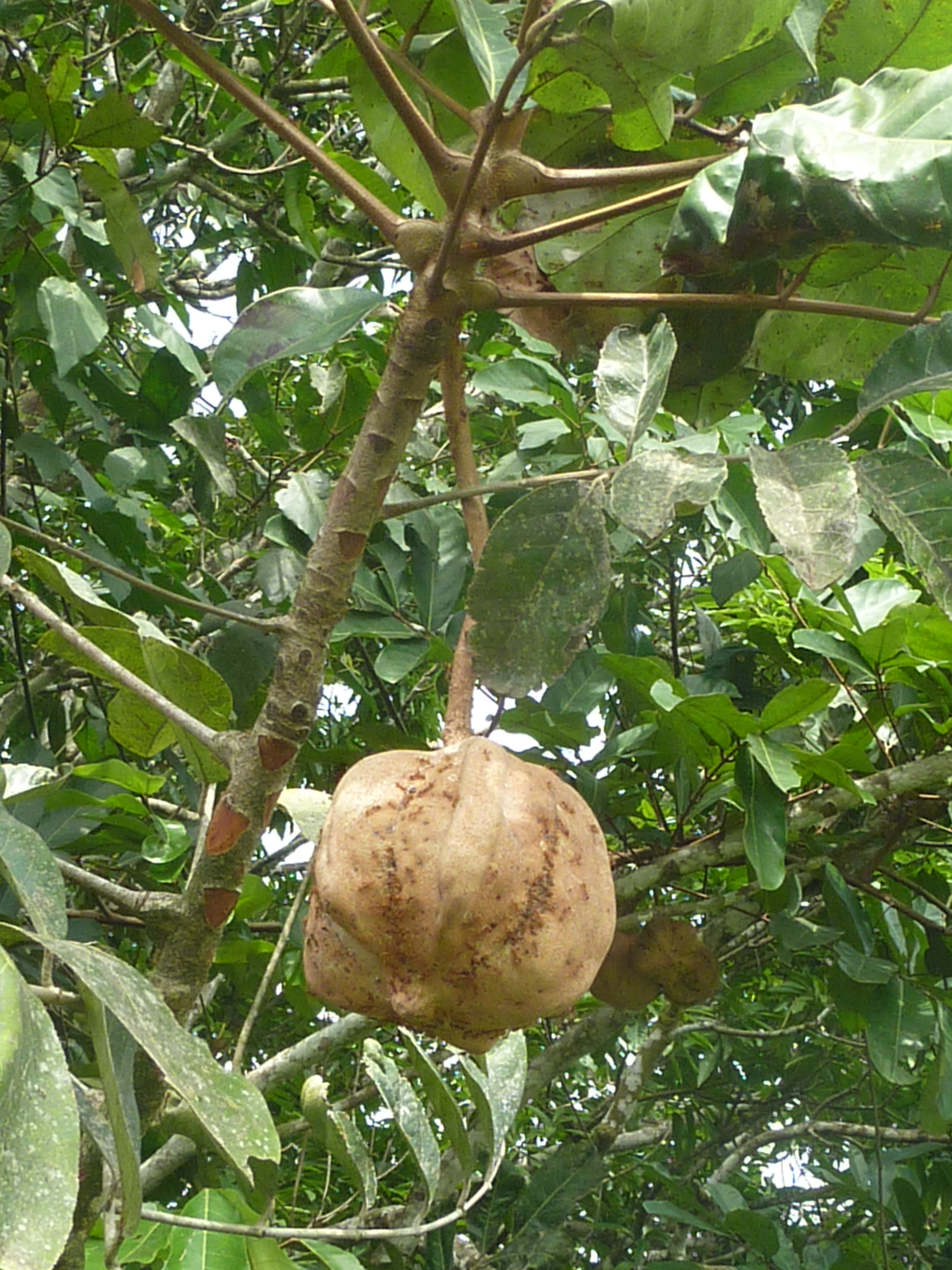
- Ripe nut

Scientific classification
- Kingdom: Plantae
- Clade: Tracheophytes
- Clade: Angiosperms
- Clade: Eudicots
- Clade: Rosids
- Order: Sapindales
- Family: Meliaceae
- Genus: Carapa
- Species: C. procera

Binomial name
- Carapa procera DC.

Synonyms
- List: Carapa guineensis Sweet; Carapa gummiflua C.DC.; Carapa guyanensis Oliv.; Carapa touloucouna Guill. & Perr.; Granatum procerum (DC.) Kuntze; Racapa procera M.Roem.; Touloucouna gigantea M.Roem.; Trichilia procera Forsyth ex DC.; Xylocarpus procerus (DC.) Steud.; Xylocarpus touloucouna (Guill. & Perr.) Steud.; Zelea splendens Ten.; Zurloa insignis Ten.; Zurloa splendens (Ten.) Ten.

= Carapa procera =

Species of plant in the genus Carapa

Carapa procera, called African crabwood, is a species of tree in the genus Carapa, native to the West African tropics and to the Amazon rainforest, and introduced to Vietnam. Some authorities have split off the South American population into its own species, Carapa surinamensis. The nuts are intensively collected in the wild for their oil, a non-timber forest product. In tropical Africa, the species is increasingly threatened.
