= Tonewood =

Type of wood used in musical instruments

Tonewood refers to specific wood varieties used for woodwind, percussion, or acoustic stringed instruments. The word implies that certain species exhibit qualities that enhance acoustic properties of the instruments, but other properties of the wood such as aesthetics and availability have always been considered in the selection of wood for musical instruments. According to Mottola's Cyclopedic Dictionary of Lutherie Terms, tonewood is:

Wood that is used to make stringed musical instruments. The term is often used to indicate wood species that are suitable for stringed musical instruments and, by exclusion, those that are not. But the list of species generally considered to be tonewoods changes constantly and has changed constantly throughout history.

== Varieties of tonewood ==
Generally speaking, stiff-but-light softwoods (i.e. from coniferous trees) are favored for the soundboards or soundboard-like surface that transmits the vibrations of the strings to the ambient air. Hardwoods (i.e. from deciduous trees) are favored for the body or framing element of an instrument. Woods used for woodwind instruments include African blackwood (Dalbergia melanoxylon) – also known as grenadilla – used in modern clarinets, oboes, and wooden concert flutes. Bassoons are usually made of hard maples, especially Norway maple (Acer platanoides), but sometimes palisander and rosewoods (Dalbergia spp.) is used in older or French-system bassoons. Wooden flutes, recorders, oboes, and early clarinet-like wind instruments of the Baroque and Classical periods may be made of various hardwoods, such as pear (Pyrus spp.), boxwood (Buxus spp.), or ebony (Diospyros spp.).

=== Softwoods ===
- Spruce is often used in the soundboards of instruments from the lute, oud, violin, viol, mandolin, guitar, and harpsichord families; as well as the piano. Spruce is particularly suited for this use because of its high stiffness-to-weight ratio. Commonly used varieties are Sitka/Alaskan spruce (Picea sitchensis), Adirondack/Red spruce (Picea rubens), Engelmann spruce (Picea engelmannii), and Picea abies (variously known as Norwegian, German, Alpine, Italian, or European spruce).
- Cedar has since the 1950s been used in the tops of classical guitars (Western red cedar (Thuja plicata), although not a true cedar) and to a lesser but growing degree in steel-string acoustic guitars. Also, genuine Lebanon cedar wood is used today in Crete, Syria, and Anatolia region for several traditional musical instruments, like the lyre.
- Although a softwood, cypresses such as Mediterranean cypress (Cupressus sempervirens) are used on the back and sides of flamenco guitars (guitars' back and sides by vast majority are of hardwoods), the distinction between flamenco and classical guitars only became apparent when makers started marketing their lower priced, snappy sounding, and thinner topped cypress guitars for the players of flamenco since Antonio de Torres – the progenitor of the modern classical guitar – did not differentiate between them constructionally.
- Yew was once as common as maple for the bowls of lutes and theorbos.
- Other softwoods, such as redwoods and Douglas fir have been used to a limited degree. Redwood is not used commonly for guitars with steel strings, but has been used for classical guitars.

=== Hardwoods ===
- Maple, especially Norway maple and sycamore maple, is traditionally used for the backs and sides of violin family instruments. One variation, the Bosnian maple, is probably the maple used by the Cremonese violin makers such as Antonio Stradivari and Giuseppe Guarneri. Maple is also frequently seen in acoustic guitars and mandolins. Most Fender electric guitars feature maple necks. Variations of maple (commonly lumbers with highly figured flames, quilts, or birdseye features) are highly sought after for the back and ribs of violin family instruments and their veneers are used on some of the tops of electric guitars for looks. The pinblock, bridges, and action components of the grand piano are usually made of maple or of beech.
- Mahogany may be used in the tops (although acoustically not optimal) of some guitars as well as the back, sides, and necks of instruments of the mandolin and guitar families. Mahogany may also be used for the solid bodies of electric guitars, such as the Gibson Les Paul. For lack of availability, other similar woods are used as mahogany replacements, such as Australian red cedar, Indonesian mahogany, African mahogany (Khaya), meranti (Lauan), kauri (Agathis), Nato (mora spp.), sapele, sipo (Entandrophragma utile), nyatoh, and okoume. Some of these alternatives are mahogany family timbers.
- Rosewoods are very often used in the back and sides of guitars and mandolins and fretboards on guitars. The most sought-after variety, Brazilian rosewood (Dalbergia nigra), has become scarce and expensive because of high demand, limited availability, and strict trade restrictions such as embargoes and CITES regulations. However, in August 2019, CITES announced an exception for rosewood used in musical instruments. The most widely used rosewood used currently is East Indian rosewood, often paired with a spruce top for steel string guitars and with spruce or cedar for classical guitars. Another rosewood, cocobolo, is used in some high-end clarinets and guitars. Rosewoods are also the wood of choice for marimba bars.
- Indian laurel is a more inexpensive, sustainable alternative to rosewood that, since the latter's temporary CITES ban, has come into use for guitar fretboards for its similar tone, feel, strength, durability, and appearance.
- Koa is traditionally used for ukuleles. Koa is also used for steel string guitars mostly for its beauty and compressed dynamic range.
- Ebony is also often used in many types of instruments for fingerboards, tailpieces, tuning pegs, and so forth for its attractive jet-black appearance, smoothness to the touch, hardness, and wear resistance. Several varieties of ebony are used. Ebony is often dyed to make it appear more uniformly black than the natural wood, which sometimes shows brown streaks.
- Paubrasilia, commonly called Pernambuco or Brazilwood, is the most sought-after material for the bows of classical stringed instruments, because of its effects on the tones they produce and the balance of stiffness and flexibility for the need of string players.
- Walnut is often used for the backs and sides of guitars and mandolin family instruments.
- Ash, alder, and basswood are commonly used for the bodies of electric guitars, ash for its light-colored, natural wood finishes, and alder and basswood for their uniform density, their ease of machining, and amenability to rapid finishing techniques.

== Mechanical properties of tonewoods ==
Some of the mechanical properties of common tonewoods, sorted by density.

Wood species	ρ Density kg/m^{3}	J Hardness N	E_{LR} Flexural modulus GPa	𝜈_{LR} Poisson's strain ratio	F Flexural strength MPa	C Compressive strength MPa	S Shrinkage Volume %	R Sound radiation coefficient	D Rigidity 3mm plate N·m
Balsa	150	300	3.71	0.229	19.6	11.6	8.5	33.2	8.8
Paulownia	280	1,330	4.38		37.8	20.7	6.4	14.1	
Northern white cedar	350	1,420	5.52	0.337	44.8	27.3	7.2	11.3	14.0
King Billy pine	350		5.80		69.0			11.6	
Sugi (Japanese cedar)	360	1,420	7.65		36.4	28.0	10.5	12.8	
Western red cedar	370	1,560	7.66	0.378	51.7	31.4	6.8	12.3	20.1
Obeche	380	1,910	6.69		60.8	29.3	8.7	11.0	
Engelmann spruce	385	1,740	9.44	0.422	62.2	31.5	11.0	12.9	25.8
Black cottonwood	385	1,560	8.76		58.6	31.0	12.4	12.4	
Sugar pine	400	1,690	8.21	0.356	56.6	30.8	7.9	11.3	21.2
Eastern white pine	400	1,690	8.55		59.3	33.1	8.2	11.6	
Norway spruce	405	1,680	9.70		63.0	35.5	12.9	12.0	
American basswood (linden, lime)	415	1,824	10.07	0.364	60.0	32.6	15.8	11.9	26.1
Coast redwood	415	2,000	8.41	0.360	61.7	39.2	6.9	10.8	21.7
Black willow	415	1,920	6.97		53.8	28.3	13.9	9.9	
White fir	415	2,140	10.24		66.9	39.6	9.8	12.0	
Noble fir	415	1,820	11.17		74.4	39.5	12.4	12.5	
Sitka spruce	425	2,270	11.03	0.372	70.0	38.2	11.5	12.0	28.8
White spruce	425	2,140	9.07		59.6	32.6	13.7	10.9	
Okoume	430	1,790	8.47		75.0	36.2	12.2	10.3	
Red spruce	435	2,180	10.76		66.0	33.6	11.8	11.4	
Western white pine	435	1,870	10.07	0.329	66.9	34.8	11.8	11.1	25.4
California red fir	435	2,220	10.23		71.5	37.3	11.4	11.1	
Butternut	435	2,180	8.14		55.9	35.2	10.6	9.9	
White poplar	440	1,820	8.90	0.344	65.0	NA	8.4	10.2	22.7
Red alder	450	2,620	9.52		67.6	40.1	12.6	10.2	
Yellow poplar	455	2,400	10.90	0.318	69.7	38.2	12.7	10.8	27.3
Catalpa	460	2,450	8.35		64.8	18.9	7.3	9.3	
Port Orford cedar	465	2,620	11.35	0.378	84.8	41.9	10.1	10.6	29.8
Primavera	465	3,170	7.81		70.5	40.4	8.6	8.8	
Western hemlock	465	2,400	11.24	0.485	77.9	37.3	12.4	10.6	33.1
Spanish cedar	470	2,670	9.12		70.8	40.4	10.2	9.4	
Australian red cedar	485	3,130	9.22		71.5	36.1	10.8	9.0	
Swamp ash	481–538								
European alder	495	2,890	8.99		75.9	42.2	11.0	8.6	
Alaska yellow cedar	495	2,580	9.79		76.6	43.5	9.2	9.0	
Sassafras	495	2,800	7.72		62.1	45.5	10.3	8.0	
Douglas fir	510	2,760	12.17	0.292	86.2	47.9	11.6	9.6	29.9
Bald cypress	515	2,270	9.93	0.338	73.1	43.9	10.5	8.5	25.2
Cedar of Lebanon	520	3,670	10.1		82	42	10.4	8.5	
Silver maple	530	3,110	7.86		61.4	36.0	12.0	7.3	
Mediterranean cypress	535	2,490	5.28		44.6			5.9	
Kauri	540	3,230	11.87		86.6	42.3	11.3	8.7	
Black ash	545	3,780	11.00		86.9	41.2	15.2	8.2	
American sycamore	545	3,430	9.79		69.0	37.1	14.1	7.8	
Bigleaf maple	545	3,780	10.00		73.8	41.0	11.6	7.9	
Sweetgum	545	3,780	11.31	0.325	86.2	43.6	15.8	8.4	28.5
Anigre	550	4,380	10.95		83.0	47.7	11.8	8.1	
Limba	555	2,990	10.49		86.2	45.4	10.8	7.8	
Black cherry	560	4,230	10.30	0.392	84.8	49.0	11.5	7.7	27.4
Cerejeira	560	3,510	10.88		72.9	43.5	8.3	7.9	
Queensland maple	560	3,620	10.83		81.0	47.0	15.0	7.9	
American elm	560	3,690	9.24		81.4	38.1	14.6	7.3	
Western larch	575	3,690	12.90	0.355	89.7	52.6	14.0	8.2	33.2
Avodiré	575	5,180	11.13		106.2	51.7	11.3	7.7	
Lacewood	580	3,740							
Honduran mahogany	590	4,020	10.06	0.314	80.8	46.6	7.5	7.0	25.1
Monkeypod	600	4,010	7.9		65.7	39.9	6.0	6.1	
Cuban mahogany	600	4,120	9.31		74.4	43.3	8.0	6.6	
Peruvian walnut	600	4,250	7.81		77.0	45.2	11.4	6.0	
Red elm	600	3,830	10.28		89.7	43.9	13.8	6.9	
Red maple	610	4,230	11.31	0.434	92.4	45.1	12.6	7.1	31.4
Black walnut	610	4,490	11.59	0.495	100.7	52.3	12.8	7.1	34.5
Koa	610	5,180	10.37		87.0	48.7	12.4	6.8	
Sycamore maple	615	4,680	9.92		98.1	55.0	12.3	6.5	
California black oak	620	4,840	6.76		59.4	38.9	10.2	5.3	
Nyatoh	620	4,760	13.37		96.0	54.4	8.7	7.5	
Oregon myrtle	635	5,650	8.45		66.9	38.9	11.9	5.7	
English walnut	640	5,410	10.81		111.5	50.2	13.0	6.4	
Green ash	640	5,340	11.40		97.2	48.8	12.5	6.6	
Australian blackwood	640	5,180	14.82		103.6	41.0	11.9	7.5	
African mahogany	640	4,760	10.60		91.0	49.0	10.0	6.4	
Redheart	640	5,380	10.32		98.7	46.2	10.6	6.3	
Claro walnut	640	5,030					10.7		
Norway maple	645	4,510	10.60		115.0	59.0		6.3	
Teak	655	4,740	12.28		97.1	54.8	7.2	6.6	
Narra	655	5,620	11.89		96.3	57.0	6.9	6.5	
Iroko	660	5,610	9.38		87.6	54.0	8.8	5.7	
Sapele	670	6,280	12.04		109.9	60.4	12.8	6.3	
White ash	675	5,870	12.00	0.371	103.5	51.1	13.3	6.2	31.3
Dark red meranti	675	3,570	12.02		87.7	48.8	12.5	6.3	
European ash	680	6,580	12.31		103.6	51.0	15.3	6.3	
Makore	685	5,350	10.71		112.6	57.2	12.4	5.8	
Yellow birch	690	5,610	13.86	0.426	114.5	56.3	16.8	6.5	38.1
Pear	690	7,380	7.80		83.3	44.1	13.8	4.9	
Field maple	690	5,110	11.80		123.0			6.0	
Red oak	700	5,430	12.14	0.350	99.2	46.8	13.7	5.9	31.1
Hard maple	705	6,450	12.62	0.424	109.0	54.0	14.7	6.0	34.6
European beech	710	6,460	14.31		110.1	57.0	17.3	6.3	
American beech	720	5,780	11.86		102.8	51.1	17.2	5.6	
Afrormosia	725	6,980	11.83		102.9	66.0	9.9	5.6	
Pecan	735	8,100	11.93		94.5	54.1	13.6	5.5	
African padauk	745	8,760	11.72		116.0	56.0	7.6	5.3	
Keruing	745	6,170	15.81		115.2	61.4	16.3	6.2	
White oak	755	5,990	12.15	0.369	102.3	50.8	16.3	5.3	31.6
Black siris	760	7,260	11.8		96.4	56.1	12.3	5.2	
Black locust	770	7,560	14.14		133.8	70.3	10.2	5.6	
Tzalem	780	6,230	13.10		88.3		9.5	5.3	
Plum	795	6,900	10.19		88.4			4.5	
Zebrawood	805	8,160	16.37		122.8	63.5	17.8	5.6	
Ziricote	805	8,780	10.93		113.1	63.9	9.8	4.6	
Ovangkol	825	5,900	18.60		140.3	64.2	12.1	5.8	
Yellowheart	825	7,950	16.64		115.9	69.5	12.0	5.4	
East Indian rosewood	830	10,870	11.50		114.4	59.7	8.5	4.5	
Canarywood	830	6,750	14.93		131.6	67.2	8.4	5.1	
Brazilian rosewood	835	12,410	13.93		135.0	67.2	8.5	4.9	
Partridgewood	835	7,960	18.17		127.5	64.1	12.3	5.6	
Pignut hickory	835	9,520	15.59		138.6	63.4	17.5	5.2	
Indian laurel	855	10,390	12.46		101.4	56.7	13.2	4.5	
Osage orange	855	11,640	11.64		128.6	64.7	9.2	4.3	
Bocote	855	8,950	12.19		114.4	59.4	11.6	4.4	
Pau ferro	865	8,710	10.86		122.4	60.9	9.9	4.1	
Wenge	870	8,600	17.59		151.7	80.7	12.9	5.2	
Panga panga	870	7,310	15.73		131.2	75.1	10.5	4.9	
Leopardwood	885	9,560	19.91			50.2	11.5	5.4	
Bubinga	890	10,720	18.41		168.3	75.8	13.9	5.1	
Purpleheart	905	11,190	20.26		151.7	83.7	10.6	5.2	
Gonçalo alves	905	9,640	16.56		117.0	74.2	11.2	4.7	
Jatoba	910	11,950	18.93		155.2	81.2	12.1	5.0	
Santos mahogany	915	10,680	16.41		148.7	80.6	10.0	4.6	
Madagascar rosewood	935	12,080	12.01		165.7	76.6	10.3	3.8	
Macacauba	950	12,030	19.6		148.6	80.7	7.2	4.8	
Gaboon ebony	955	13,700	16.89		158.1	76.3	19.6	4.4	
Boxwood	975	12,610	17.20		144.5	68.6	15.8	4.3	
Brazilwood	980	12,540	17.55		179.4		13.3	4.3	
Chechen	990	10,010					10.8		
Mora	1,015	10,230	19.24		155.5	82.4	17.7	4.3	
Curapay	1,025	16,150	18.04		193.2	94.4	12.0	4.1	
Honduran rosewood	1,025	9,790	22.00					4.5	
Pau rosa	1,030	13,080	17.10		166.2	92.8	10.7	4.0	
Bloodwood	1,050	12,900	20.78		174.4	98.7	11.7	4.2	
Bulletwood	1,080	13,920	23.06		192.2	89.2	16.8	4.3	
Cumaru	1,085	14,800	22.33		175.1	95.5	12.6	4.2	
Cocobolo	1,095	14,140	18.70		158.0	81.3	7.0	3.8	
Ipê	1,100	15,620	22.07		177.0	93.8	12.4	4.1	
Macassar ebony	1,120	14,140	17.35		157.2	80.2	-	3.5	
Katalox	1,150	16,260	25.62		193.2	105.1	11.2	4.1	
Snakewood	1,210	16,900	23.2		195	119	10.7	3.6	
Lignum vitae	1,260	19,510	14.09		127.2	84.1	14.0	2.7	
African blackwood	1,270	16,320	17.95		213.6	72.9	7.7	3.0	
CFRP	1,600		135	0.30	1500	1200	0	5.7	334
Common flat glass	2,530		74				0	2.1	
Aluminium alloy	2,700		68	0.33			0	1.9	172
Steel alloy	8,000		200	0.30			0	0.6	495

CFRP, glass, aluminium, and steel added for comparison, since they are sometimes used in musical instruments.

Density is measured at 12% moisture content of the wood, i.e. air at 70 °F (21°C) and 65% relative humidity. Most professional luthiers will build at 8% moisture content (45% relative humidity), and such wood weighs less on average than that reported here, since it contains less water.

Data comes from the Wood Database, except for 𝜈_{LR}, Poisson's ratio, which comes from the Forest Product Laboratory, United States Forest Service, United States Department of Agriculture. The ratio displayed here is for deformation along the radial axis caused by stress along the longitudinal axis.

The shrink volume percent shown here is the amount of shrinkage in all three dimensions as the wood goes from green to oven-dry. This can be used as a relative indicator of how much the dry wood will change as humidity changes, sometimes referred to as the instrument's "stability". However, the stability of tuning is primarily due to the length-wise shrinkage of the neck, which is typically only about 0.1% to 0.2% green to dry. The volume shrinkage is mostly due to the radial and tangential shrinkage. In the case of a neck (quarter-sawn), the radial shrinkage affects the thickness of the neck, and the tangential shrinkage affects the width of the neck. Given the dimensions involved, this shrinkage should be practically unnoticeable. The shrinkage of the length of the neck, as a percent, is quite a bit less, but given the dimension, it is enough to affect the pitch of the strings.

The sound radiation coefficient is defined as:

$R = \sqrt { \cfrac {E}{{\rho} ^ {3}}}$

where $E$ is flexural modulus in Pascals (i.e. the number in the table multiplied by 10^{9}), and ρ is the density in kg/m^{3}, as in the table.

From this, it can be seen that the loudness of the top of a stringed instrument increases with stiffness, and decreases with density. The loudest wood tops, such as Sitka Spruce, are lightweight and stiff, while maintaining the necessary strength. Denser woods, for example Hard Maple, often used for necks, are stronger but not as loud (R = 6 vs. 12).

When wood is used as the top of an acoustic instrument, it can be described using plate theory and plate vibrations. The flexural rigidity of an isotropic plate is:

$D = {\cfrac {EH^{3}}{12(1-\nu ^{2})}}$

where $E$ is flexural modulus for the material, $H$ is the plate thickness, and $\nu$ is Poisson's ratio for the material. Plate rigidity has units of Pascal·m^{3} (equivalent to N·m), since it refers to the moment per unit length per unit of curvature, and not the total moment. Wood is not isotropic, but orthotropic, so this equation describes the rigidity in one orientation. For example, using 𝜈LR, one gets the rigidity when bending on the longitudinal axis (with the grain), as would be usual for an instrument's top. This is typically 10 to 20 times the cross-grain rigidity for most species.

The value for $D$ shown in the table was calculated using this formula and a thickness $H$ of 3 mm.

When wood is used as the neck of an instrument, it can be described using beam theory. Flexural rigidity of a beam (defined as $EI$) varies along the length as a function of x shown in the following equation:

$$\ EI {dy \over dx}\ = \int_{0}^{x} M(x) dx + C_1$$

where $E$ is the flexural modulus for the material, $I$ is the second moment of area (in m^{4}), $y$ is the transverse displacement of the beam at x, and $M(x)$ is the bending moment at x. Beam flexural rigidity has units of Pascal·m^{4} (equivalent to N·m²).

The amount of deflection at the end of a cantilevered beam is:

$w_C = \tfrac{PL^3}{3EI}$

where $P$ is the point load at the end, and $L$ is the length. So deflection is inversely proportional to $EI$. Given two necks of the same shape and dimensions, $I$ becomes a constant, and deflection becomes inversely proportional to $E$—in short, the higher this number for a given wood species, the less a neck will deflect under a given force (i.e. from the strings).

Read more about mechanical properties in Wood for Guitars.

== Sources ==
Many tonewoods come from sustainable sources through specialist dealers. Spruce, for example, is very common, but large pieces with even grain represent a small proportion of total supply and can be expensive. Some tonewoods are particularly hard to find on the open market, and small-scale instrument makers often turn to reclamation, for instance from disused salmon traps in Alaska, various old construction in the U.S Pacific Northwest, from trees that have blown down, or from specially permitted removals in conservation areas where logging is not generally permitted. Mass market instrument manufacturers have started using Asian and African woods, such as bubinga (Guibourtia species) and wenge (Millettia laurentii), as inexpensive alternatives to traditional tonewoods.

The Fiemme Valley, in the Alps of Northern Italy, has long served as a source of high-quality spruce for musical instruments, dating from the violins of Antonio Stradivari to the piano soundboards of the contemporary maker Fazioli.

== Preparation ==
Tonewood choices vary greatly among different instrument types. Guitar makers generally favor quartersawn wood because it provides added stiffness and dimensional stability. Soft woods, like spruce, may be split rather than sawn into boards so the board surface follows the grain as much as possible, thus limiting run-out. This is especially important for braces because it maximizes their strength.

For most applications, wood must be dried before use, either in air or kilns. Some luthiers prefer further seasoning for several years. Wood for instruments is typically used at 8% moisture content (which is in equilibrium with air at 45% relative humidity). This is drier than usually produced by kilns, which is 12% moisture content (65% relative humidity). If an instrument is kept at a humidity that is significantly lower than that at which it was built, it may crack. Therefore, valuable instruments must be contained in controlled environments to prevent cracking, especially cracking of the top.

Some guitar manufacturers subject the wood to rarefaction, which mimics the natural aging process of tonewoods. Torrefaction is also used for this purpose, but it often changes the cosmetic properties of the wood. Guitar builders using torrefied soundboards claim improved tone, similar to that of an aged instrument. Softwoods such as spruce, cedar, and redwood, which are commonly used for guitar soundboards, are easier to torrefy than hardwoods, such as maple.

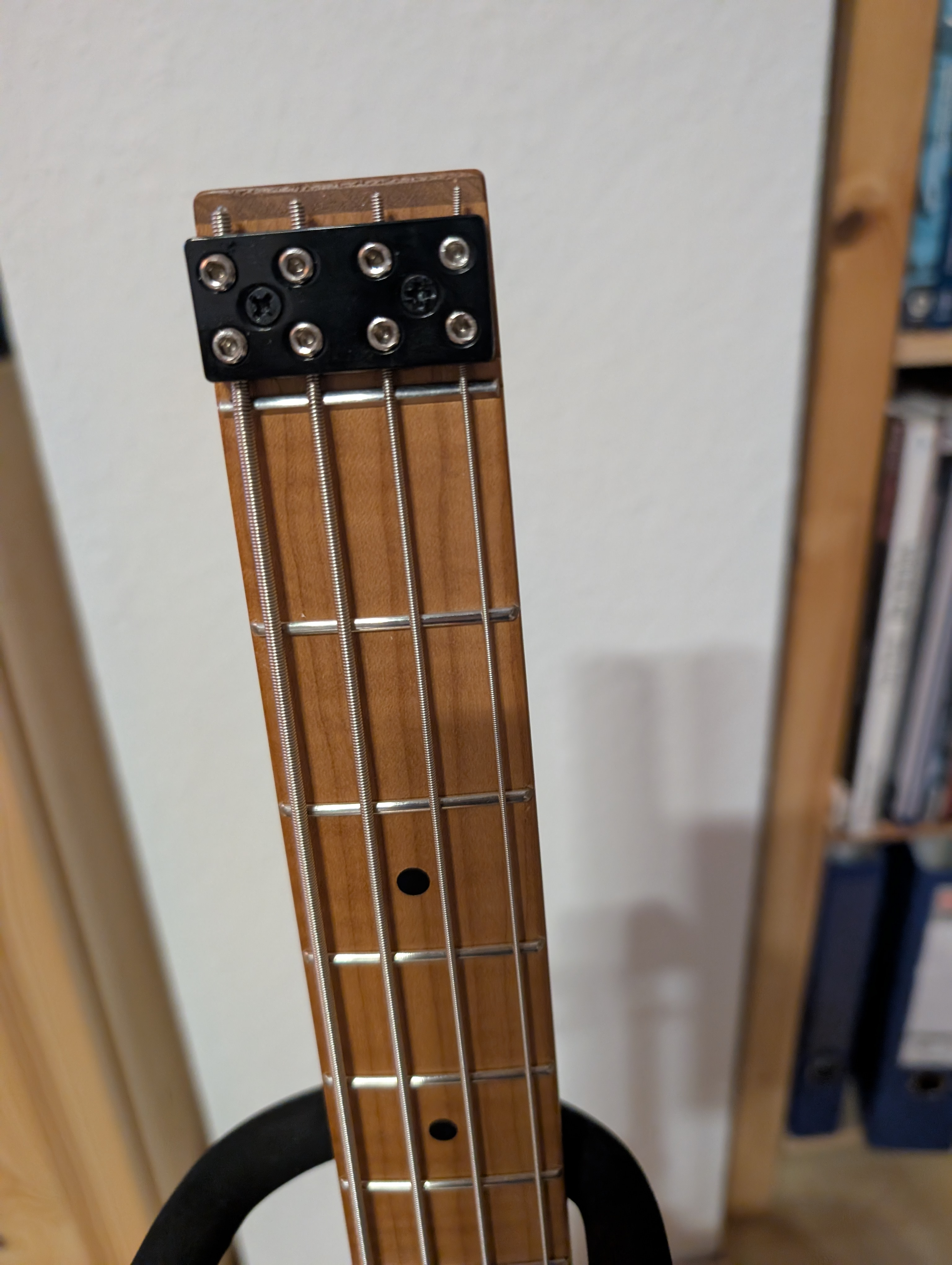
electric bass guitar with "roasted" maple fretboard by Kolibri Guitars

On inexpensive guitars, it is increasingly common to use roseacer for the fretboard, which mimics rosewood, but is actually a form of thermally-modified maple.

"Roasted" maple necks are increasingly popular as manufacturers claim increased stiffness and stability in changing conditions (heat and humidity). However, while engineering tests of the thermally-modified wood indicated increased resistance to humidity, they also showed a significant reduction in strength (ultimate breaking point), while stiffness (flexural modulus) remained the same or was slightly reduced. Although the reduction in strength can be controlled by reducing the temperature of the process, the manufacturer recommends not using its product for structural purposes. However, it is perhaps possible to compensate for this loss of strength in guitars by using carbon-fiber stiffeners in necks and increased bracing in tops.
