= Bucculatrix improvisa =

Scientific classification
- Kingdom: Animalia
- Phylum: Arthropoda
- Clade: Pancrustacea
- Class: Insecta
- Order: Lepidoptera
- Family: Bucculatricidae
- Genus: Bucculatrix
- Species: B. improvisa

Binomial name
- Bucculatrix improvisa Braun, 1963

Species of moth

Bucculatrix improvisa is a moth in the family Bucculatricidae. It was described by Annette Frances Braun in 1963 and is found in North America, where it has been recorded from Ohio.

The wingspan is 7–7.5 mm. The forewings are golden brown or ocherous, the scales mostly tipped with dark brown. The hindwings are fuscous. Adults have been recorded on wing in July. There are two generations per year.

The larvae feed on Tilia americana, Tilia neglecta and Tilia heterophylla. They mine the leaves of their host plant. The mine has the form of a fine thread, at first lying alongside the vein, then sharply diverging from it. Older larvae leave the mine and live freely on the leaf, which is eaten in patches, leaving the upper epidermis. Full-grown larvae are greenish red. Pupation takes place in a yellowish cocoon, which is spun on the underside of a leaf. The species overwinters in the pupal stage.
