= Nato wood =

General name for wood from Mora trees

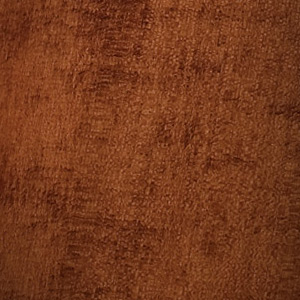
Nato wood, as used on Takamine guitars

Nato wood is a general term for wood from Mora trees. The best-known species are Mora excelsa (mora) and Mora gonggrijpii (morabukea). This should not be confused with nyatoh, an Asian hardwood from the family Sapotaceae with a very similar look and characteristics to Honduras mahogany, though totally unrelated.

Mora may vary in appearance, with reddish brown being the dominant color, but with varying shades and often with darker or lighter streaks. It has a similar appearance to mahogany, and as such it is often referred to as "eastern mahogany". Despite this, the two are unrelated. The heartwood is light to medium reddish brown. Wide pale yellow-brown sapwood is clearly demarcated from heartwood. It has a straight to interlocked grain, with a medium to coarse texture and good natural luster. The wood is dense and it is not particularly easy to dry or to work, although it finishes well. Mora wood species are not listed in the CITES Appendices or on the IUCN Red List of Threatened Species.

Because of its similar properties to more traditional tone woods like mahogany, many guitar manufacturers use nato in their construction. Squier, Epiphone, Gretsch, BC Rich, Eastwood and Japan-based manufacturers Yamaha, Hondo and Takamine are amongst them.

The wood is available in large solid cuts and is well above average in properties such as resistance to wear, strength, and durability, making it an excellent candidate for heavy construction, industrial flooring, railroad ties, and boatbuilding.
