= Guibourtia arnoldiana =

Conservation status
- Least Concern (IUCN 3.1)

Scientific classification
- Kingdom: Plantae
- Clade: Tracheophytes
- Clade: Angiosperms
- Clade: Eudicots
- Clade: Rosids
- Order: Fabales
- Family: Fabaceae
- Genus: Guibourtia
- Species: G. arnoldiana

Binomial name
- Guibourtia arnoldiana (De Wild. & T.Durand) J.Léonard

Synonyms
- Copaiba arnoldiana De Wild. & T.Durand; Copaifera arnoldiana (De Wild. & T.Durand) T.Durand & H.Durand

Species of legume

Guibourtia arnoldiana (mutenyé, benge, or mbenge) is a species of Guibourtia in the family Fabaceae, native to tropical western Africa from the Gabon, Republic of the Congo, western Democratic Republic of the Congo, and northernmost Angola (Cabinda).

It is a tree growing to 20–30 m tall, with a trunk 40–80 cm diameter.

The wood is valuable, durable and moderately resistant to wood-boring insects including termites. It is used for joinery, furniture, flooring, and decorative panelling. The timber provides high chatoyance, with an average value above 20 PZC.
