= Guibourtia sousae =

Conservation status
- Critically Endangered (IUCN 3.1)

Scientific classification
- Kingdom: Plantae
- Clade: Tracheophytes
- Clade: Angiosperms
- Clade: Eudicots
- Clade: Rosids
- Order: Fabales
- Family: Fabaceae
- Genus: Guibourtia
- Species: G. sousae

Binomial name
- Guibourtia sousae J. Léonard

Species of legume

Guibourtia sousae is a species of plant in the family Fabaceae. It is found only in Mozambique.
