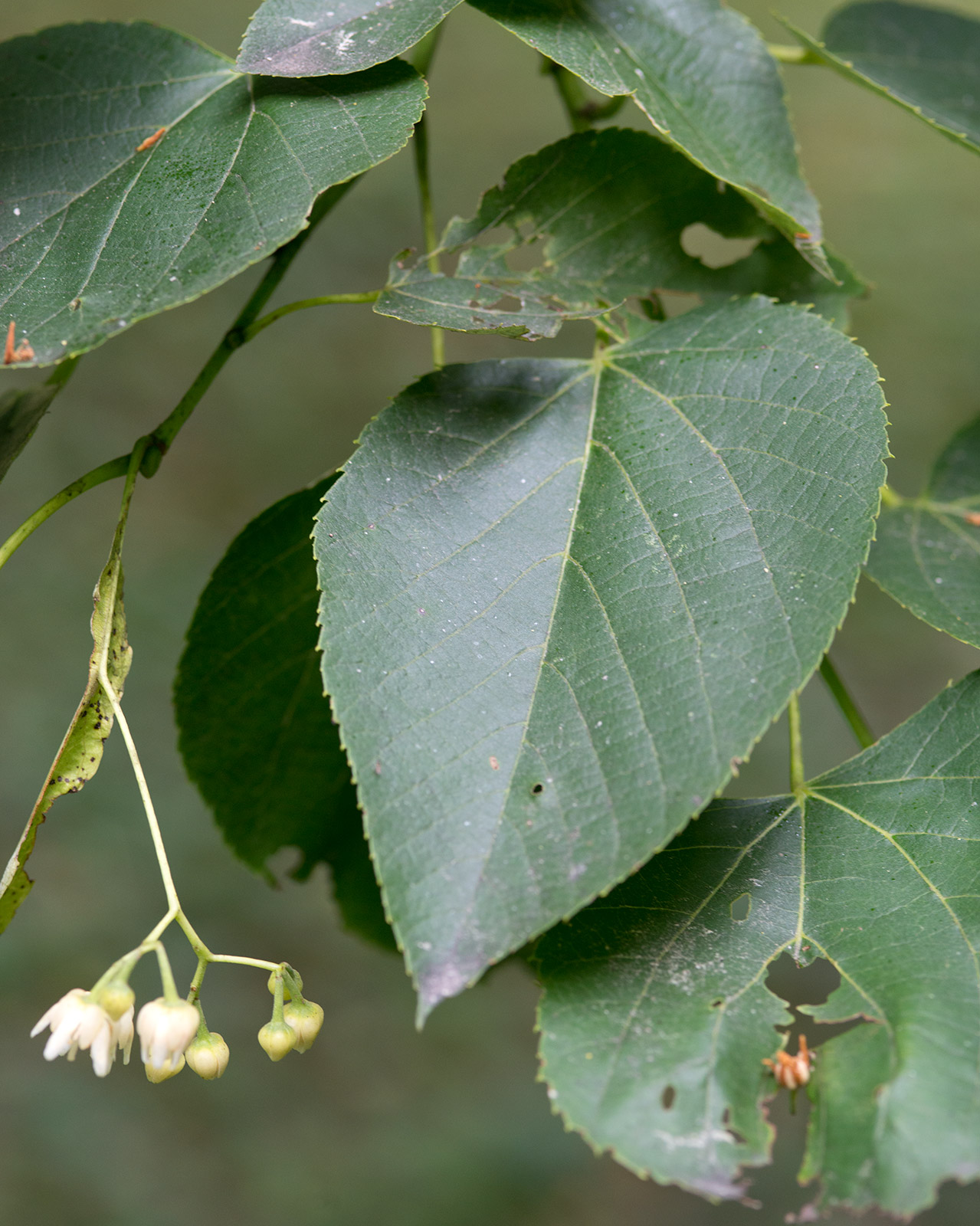
- Leaves and flowers

Conservation status
- Least Concern (IUCN 3.1)

Scientific classification
- Kingdom: Plantae
- Clade: Tracheophytes
- Clade: Angiosperms
- Clade: Eudicots
- Clade: Rosids
- Order: Malvales
- Family: Malvaceae
- Genus: Tilia
- Species: T. americana

Binomial name
- Tilia americana L.
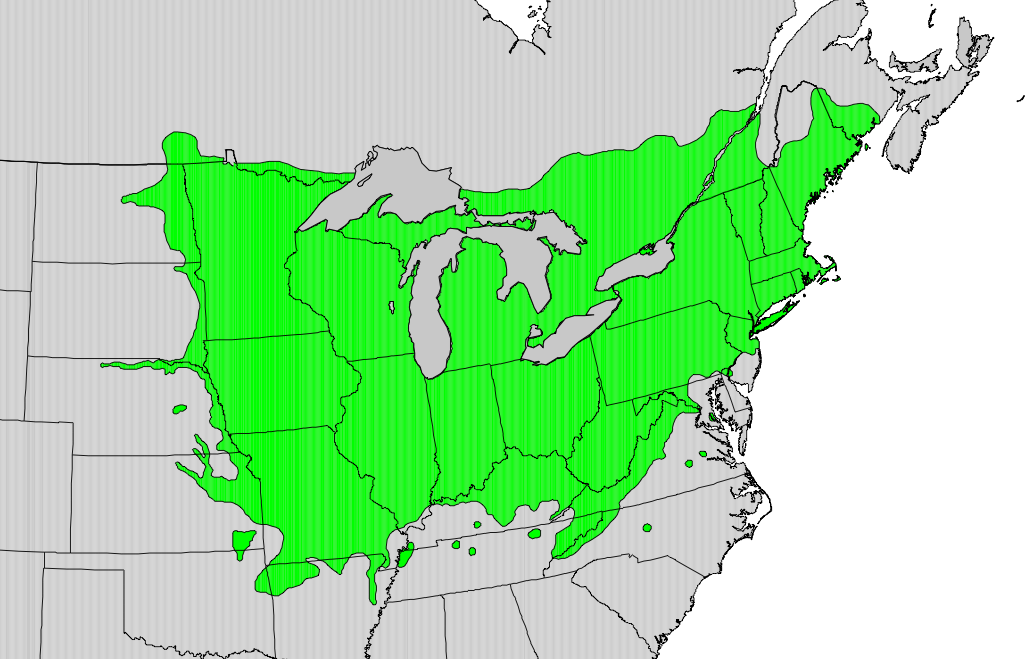
- Natural range

Synonyms
- Tilia glabra Ventenat

= Tilia americana =

Species of tree

Tilia americana is a species of tree in the family Malvaceae. It is native to eastern North America, from southeast Manitoba east to New Brunswick, southwest to northeast Oklahoma, southeast to South Carolina, and west along the Niobrara River to Cherry County, Nebraska. It is the sole representative of its genus in the Western Hemisphere, assuming T. caroliniana is treated as a subspecies or local ecotype of T. americana. Common names include American basswood and American linden.

== Description ==
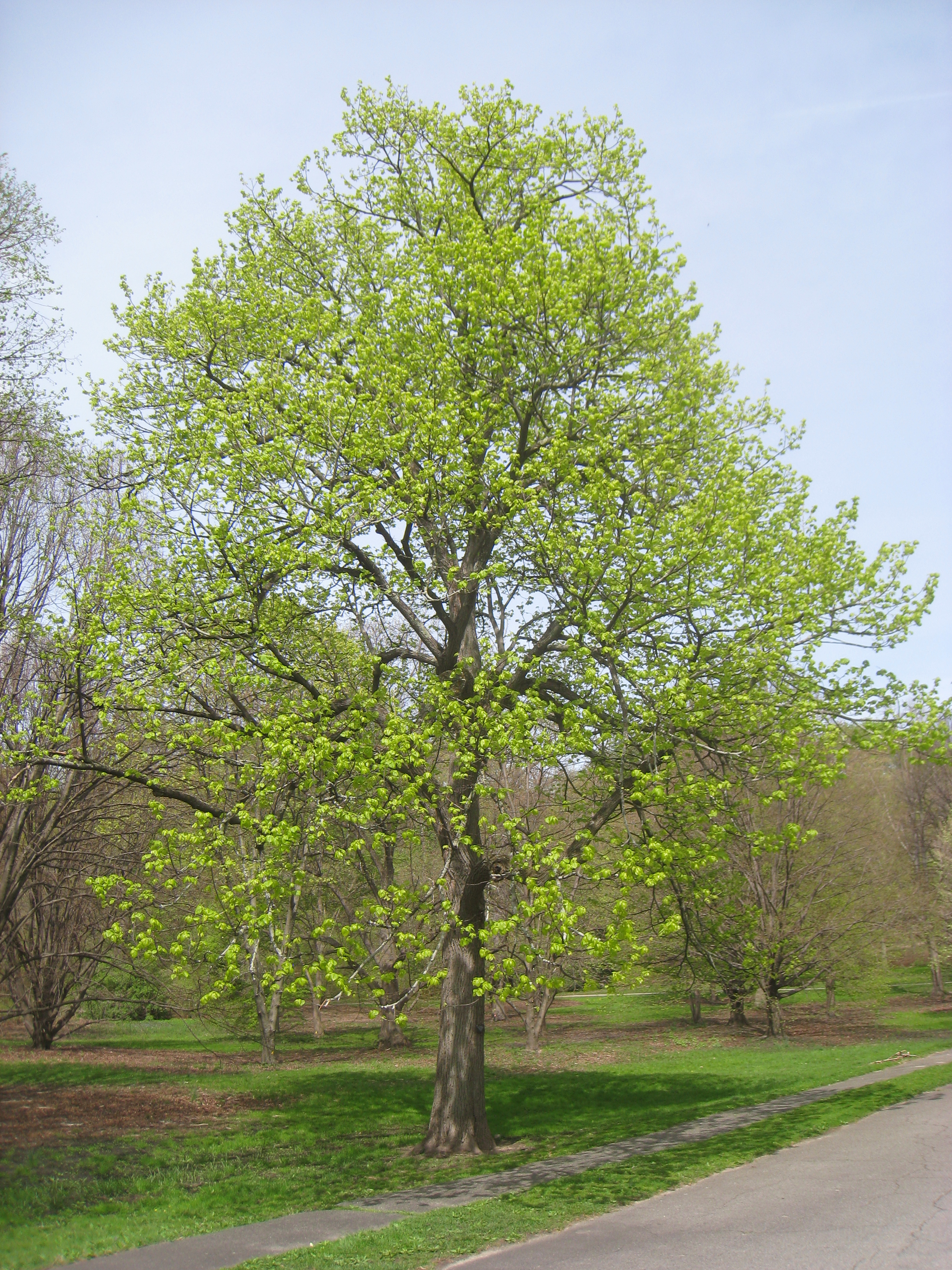
A specimen in the Arnold Arboretum leafing out in spring

The American basswood is a medium-sized to large deciduous tree reaching a height of 18 to 37 m (60 to 120 ft) exceptionally 39 m (128 ft) with a trunk diameter of 1–1.5 m (3–5 ft) at maturity. It grows faster than many North American hardwoods, often twice the annual growth rate of American beech and many birch species. Life expectancy is around 200 years, with flowering and seeding generally occurring between 15 and 100 years, though occasionally seed production may start as early as eight years.

The crown is domed, the branches spreading, often pendulous. The bark is gray to light brown, with narrow, well defined fissures. The roots are large, deep, and spreading. The twigs are smooth, reddish-green, becoming light gray in their second year, finally dark brown or brownish gray, marked with dark wart-like excrescences. The winter buds are stout, ovate-acute, smooth, deep red, with two bud scales visible.

The leaves are simple, alternately arranged, ovate to cordate, asymmetrical, unequal at the base (the side nearer the branch the larger), 10–15 cm (4–6 in) (can grow up to 25 cm or 10 in) long and broad, with a long, slender petiole, a coarsely serrated margin and an acuminate apex. William Jackson Bean noted that occasionally, enormous leaves measuring 38 cm or 15 in long by 25 cm or 10 in wide appear on thick, succulent shoots. They open from the bud conduplicate, pale green, downy; when full grown are dark green, smooth, shining above, paler beneath, with tufts of rusty brown hairs in the axils of the primary veins; the small stipules fall soon after leaf opening. The fall color is yellow-green to yellow. Both the twigs and leaves contain mucilaginous sap.

The flowers are small, fragrant, yellowish-white, 10–14 mm (13/32–9/16 inch) in diameter, arranged in drooping, cymose clusters of 6–20 with a whitish-green leaf-like bract attached for half its length at the base of the cyme. They are perfect, regular, with five sepals and petals, numerous stamens, and a five-celled superior ovary. The leaves emerge in mid-spring, but the flowers require day lengths of approximately 14 hours and 30 minutes to form, hence T. americana's range is limited to north of the 35th parallel. Time of flowering varies by several weeks depending on the latitude; early May in Canada and early June in the extreme southern extent. Leaf drop in fall occurs between early and late October depending on the latitude. The flowers are fragrant and insect-pollinated.

The fruit is a small, globose, downy, hard and dry cream-colored nutlet with a diameter of 8–10 mm (5/16–13/32 in).

== Ecology ==
American basswood is dominant in the sugar maple–basswood forest association, which is most common in western Wisconsin and central Minnesota, but occurs as far east as New England and southern Quebec in places that have mesic soil with relatively high pH. It also has minor occurrence in many other forest cover types.

Its flowers provide abundant nectar for insects. The seeds are eaten by chipmunks, mice, and squirrels. Rabbits and voles eat the bark, sometimes girdling young trees. The leaves serve as food for caterpillars of various Lepidoptera (see Lepidoptera which feed on Tilia). The ribbed cocoon maker species Bucculatrix improvisa has not been found on other plants.

This species is particularly susceptible to adult Japanese beetles (an invasive species in North America) that feed on its leaves. The mushroom Pholiota squarrosoides is known to decay the logs of the tree.

== Cultivation and uses ==
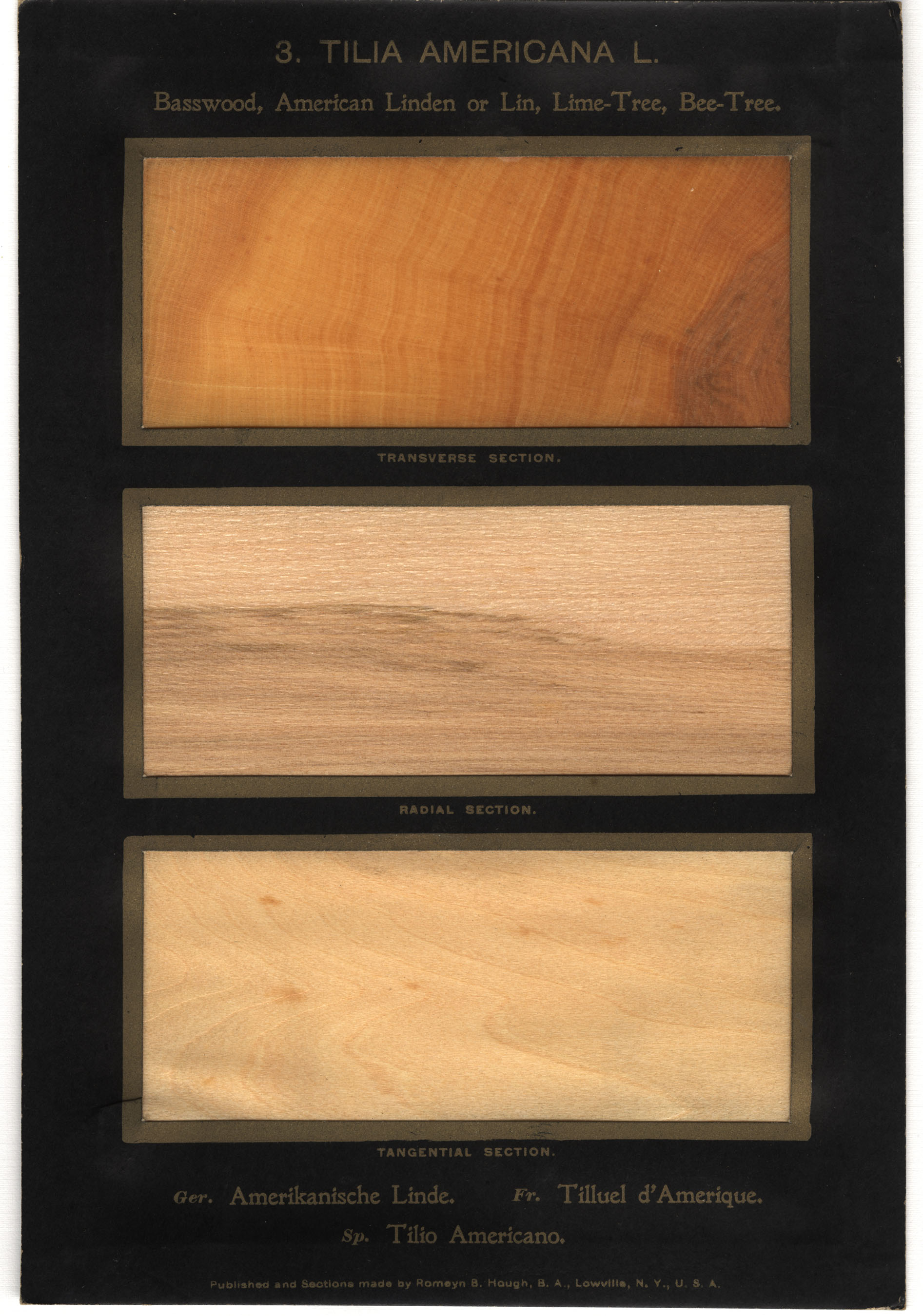
Sections of Tilia americana from The American Woods

T. americana mostly spreads by self-coppicing rather than seeds. Juvenile basswoods coppice readily, and even old trees may sprout from the stump if cut. T. americana seeds have a low viability rate of approximately 30%, and seeds develop an unusually hard seed coating after reaching maturity. This seed coating can delay germination for up to two years. It is possible to gather seeds in early autumn to sow before they dry out and form the harder coating.

The American basswood is recommended as an ornamental tree when the mass of foliage or a deep shade is desired; no native tree surpasses it in this respect. It is often planted on the windward side of an orchard as a protection to young and delicate trees. It is cultivated at least as far north as Juneau, Alaska.

The foliage and flowers are both edible, though the tender young leaves are more palatable. It is a beneficial species for attracting pollinators as well. Bees produce excellent honey with a mildly spicy flavor from its blossoms. The inner bark was used historically as a fiber source for making baskets, rope, and fishing nets.

Basswood attracts many insect pests, including Japanese beetles, and skeletonized leaves are common. Mite galls commonly form on the foliage.

Cultivars include 'Nova', 'Duros' (with an upright crown), the pyramidal 'Frontyard' and the conic-crowned 'Redmond'.

The tree was introduced to the UK in 1752, but has never prospered there, being prone to dieback.

=== Wood ===
The wood is pale brown, sometimes nearly white or faintly tinged with red; light, soft with fine close grain; clear of knots but does not split easily. It is low in strength and has a poor steam-bending classification. It can take stains and polish without difficulty and it planes, glues, screws and nails well. It is sold generally under the name basswood. It has a density of 0.4525 (relative to water). The wood is considered odorless. This makes it valuable in the manufacture of wooden utensils and furniture. It is also used for woodcarving. The inner bark is very tough and fibrous, used in the past for making ropes.

Basswood is a tonewood commonly used in the manufacture of solid-body electric guitars. It is relatively lightweight and easy to work and sand. It accepts paint and finishes very well. It is usually used for guitars that will be painted an opaque color as its lack of notable grain makes it an unattractive candidate for transparent finish. It exhibits a very balanced, even tone with a good low/mid-midrange projection making it suitable for a wide variety of musical applications. It is often paired with maple laminates to balance the midrange with more treble (inherent to maple) to make a very well rounded sounding instrument. It is also relatively inexpensive, which has made it a favorite of large factories mass-producing instruments.

It has proven especially popular in instruments made for musicians who play heavy metal. This could be because its tonality helps level out the thin, tinny sound associated with knife edged tremolo contacts that many modern rock and metal players use as bridges on their guitars.

Recently, basswood was used in the development of "Nxylon", a super-black material discovered by University of British Columbia researchers. As the primary wood used to create Nxylon, basswood's natural properties contribute to the material's lightweight, stiff structure that can be easily cut into intricate shapes. The use of basswood in Nxylon demonstrates how a common, sustainable resource can be transformed into a high-tech material with applications in fine jewelry, solar cells, and precision optical devices.

=== Medicinal uses ===
Although Tilia cordata is believed to be stronger, T. americana is also used medicinally. The dried flowers are mildly sweet and sticky, and the fruit is somewhat sweet and mucilaginous. Linden tea has a pleasing taste, due to the aromatic volatile oil found in the flowers. The flowers, leaves, wood, and charcoal (obtained from the wood) are used for medicinal purposes. Active ingredients in the linden flowers include flavonoids (which act as antioxidants), volatile oils, and mucilaginous constituents (which soothe and reduce inflammation). The plant also contains tannins that can act as an astringent.

Linden flowers are used in colds, cough, fever, infections, inflammation, high blood pressure, headache (particularly migraine), as a diuretic (increases urine production), antispasmodic (reduces smooth muscle spasm along the digestive tract), and sedative. The flowers were added to baths to quell hysteria, and steeped as a tea to relieve anxiety-related indigestion, irregular heartbeat, and vomiting. The leaves are used to promote sweating to reduce fevers. The wood is used for liver and gallbladder disorders and cellulitis (inflammation of the skin and surrounding soft tissue). The wood burned to charcoal is ingested to treat intestinal disorders and used topically to treat edema or infection, such as cellulitis or ulcers of the lower leg.

Several animal studies showed that the extract of T. americana increased sleeping time by 50 minutes (similar to the effects of diazepam) and decreased movement, which indicates sedative effects. It is argued that its mechanism of action is due to the flavonoid quercetin, as it inhibits the release of histamine.
