= Bosnian maple =

Conservation status
- Least Concern (IUCN 3.1)

Scientific classification
- Kingdom: Plantae
- Clade: Tracheophytes
- Clade: Angiosperms
- Clade: Eudicots
- Clade: Rosids
- Order: Sapindales
- Family: Sapindaceae
- Genus: Acer
- Species: A. opalus
- Subspecies: A. o. subsp. obtusatum

Trinomial name
- Acer opalus subsp. obtusatum (Waldst. & Kit. ex Willd.) Gams

Synonyms
- Acer obtusatum Waldst. & Kit. ex Willd.; Acer opalus var. obtusatum (Waldst. & Kit. ex Willd.) Schwer.

Subspecies of maple tree native to southern and south-eastern Europe

Bosnian maple (Acer opalus subsp. obtusatum), also known as Balkan maple, is a subspecies of Acer opalus in the soapberry family Sapindaceae. It is a small to medium-sized deciduous tree native to the mountains and hills of south central and southeastern Europe and parts of North Africa, where it grows mainly on limestone slopes and in mixed broadleaf woodland.

The common name “Bosnian maple” refers both to this taxon and, in the timber trade, to high quality maple wood from the western Balkans used in string instrument making, which usually derives from the related species Acer pseudoplatanus (sycamore maple).

== Description ==
Bosnian maple is typically a small to medium-sized deciduous tree or large shrub. In the wild it commonly reaches 8–13m in height, sometimes more, with a rounded to oval crown and a short trunk. The bark is grey-brown, initially smooth, becoming scaly and fissured on older trees.

The leaves are opposite, simple and palmately lobed, usually 5-lobed with short, broad, blunt lobes and shallow sinuses. They are generally 7–12cm long and up to 13–16cm across, dark to mid green and smooth above, with a grey green, persistently hairy underside that helps distinguish the subspecies from typical A. opalus. The margins are irregularly toothed, and the petiole is often yellowish to pinkish. In autumn the foliage can develop rich yellow, orange or red tones, particularly in trees grown in continental or mountain climates.

The small yellowish green flowers are produced in early spring, usually opening before or as the leaves emerge. They grow in drooping corymbs or umbels on slender stalks and are insect pollinated. The fruit is a pair of winged samaras, each nutlet rounded and about 1cm across with wings 2.5–3 cm long spreading at rough right angle.

== Taxonomy and naming ==
Acer opalus subsp. obtusatum belongs to Acer section Monspessulana. The taxon was originally described at species rank as Acer obtusatum in the early 19th century and later reduced to a subspecies of Acer opalus by Gams in 1925.

Modern botanical sources, including World Flora Online, treat Acer opalus subsp. obtusatum as an accepted subspecies. It is sometimes still referred to under the synonym Acer obtusatum, particularly in forestry and photographic sources.

The English common name “Bosnian maple” reflects the tree’s occurrence in Bosnia and Herzegovina and the wider western Balkans; it is used by several botanical gardens and horticultural references. The name “Italian maple” is more often applied to the species Acer opalus as a whole.

== Distribution and habitat ==
Bosnian maple is native to south central Europe and the western Balkans, with its range extending from Hungary and northern Italy southwards through the Apennines and the Dinaric mountains into Greece and adjacent parts of the central Mediterranean, and disjunct populations in Algeria. National and regional floras record it from countries including Italy, France, Albania, Bosnia and Herzegovina, Croatia, Montenegro, North Macedonia, Serbia and Slovenia.

The subspecies typically grows in hilly and montane regions, from a few hundred meters above sea level up to around 1,800–2,000 m in favorable sites, often on north-facing slopes and in ravines where summer drought stress is reduced. It favors calcium rich or limestone substrates, growing on rocky slopes, screes, woodland edges and clearings and in mixed deciduous forest. In the Plitvice Lakes region of Croatia, for example, Bosnian maple occurs in mixed stands with beech, sycamore maple, ash and oriental hornbeam.

== Ecology ==
Within its natural range, Bosnian maple is a component of mixed broadleaf woodland and scrub. It frequently occurs with species such as European beech (Fagus sylvatica), downy oak (Quercus pubescens), hop hornbeam (Ostrya carpinifolia) and other maples, contributing to structurally diverse forests on steep slopes and limestone outcrops.

The flowers provide an early spring nectar and pollen source for insects, including bees and hoverflies. As with other maples, the samaras are dispersed primarily by wind, allowing colonization of rocky screes and open slopes. Seedlings tend to establish in semi-shaded microsites such as beneath shrubs or within broken woodland canopy, similar to patterns observed in other Mediterranean maples.

== Cultivation ==
Bosnian maple is cultivated as an ornamental tree in arboreta and gardens, especially in Europe and North America. It is valued for its rounded habit, tolerance of calcium rich soils and drought once established, and its showy spring flowers and autumn color. The Royal Horticultural Society lists the subspecies as hardy in much of the United Kingdom (RHS hardiness rating H6), roughly equivalent to USDA hardiness zones 5–6.

Nursery descriptions characterize the tree as a rounded medium-sized maple suited to parks and larger gardens, performing well in full sun on well drained, preferably alkaline soils and exhibiting good drought tolerance, a trait sometimes cited in the context of climate-change-resilient planting. It is represented in collections such as the Royal Botanic Gardens, Kew, the Yorkshire Arboretum, Arboretum Wespelaar and arboreta in North America.

Propagation is usually by seed, although grafting or budding onto rootstocks of related maples is also employed in cultivation.

== Uses ==
=== Ornamental ===
The main documented use of Bosnian maple is as an ornamental shade and specimen tree. Its compact size relative to some other maples, together with its spring display and autumn color, has led to its inclusion in arboreta, botanic gardens and landscape plantings.

=== Timber and tonewood ===
The wood of Acer opalus as a species has been used locally in its native range for small items, tool handles and turned objects, although it is not as commercially important as that of sycamore maple (Acer pseudoplatanus). In instrument making, the term “Bosnian maple” more commonly refers to high quality, usually figured wood of sycamore maple harvested from the Dinaric Alps and neighbouring regions. This tonewood is prized for the backs, ribs and necks of violins, violas and cellos, and has often been attributed to the work of historic and modern luthiers.

== Conservation ==
The parent species Acer opalus is assessed as a species of Least Concern on the IUCN Red List, reflecting its wide distribution and generally stable populations across southern and western Europe and adjacent parts of North Africa and western Asia.

Because A. opalus subsp. obtusatum forms part of this broadly distributed taxon, it is not currently considered globally threatened, although local populations may be affected by habitat loss, forest management practices and browsing pressure from herbivores. The subspecies occurs in a number of protected areas and national parks within its range, including sites in the Dinaric Alps and other Mediterranean mountain systems.

== See also ==
- Acer opalus
- Acer pseudoplatanus
- Acer granatense
