= Guibourtia tessmannii =

Scientific classification
- Kingdom: Plantae
- Clade: Tracheophytes
- Clade: Angiosperms
- Clade: Eudicots
- Clade: Rosids
- Order: Fabales
- Family: Fabaceae
- Genus: Guibourtia
- Species: G. tessmannii

Binomial name
- Guibourtia tessmannii (Harms) J.Leonard

Synonyms
- Copaifera tessmannii Harms

Species of legume

Guibourtia tessmannii is a species of legume in the family Fabaceae. It is a medium to large-sized tree and is native to Cameroon, Gabon and Equatorial Guinea. The timber has an attractive appearance and has many uses, and the bark is used in traditional medicine.

== Description ==
Guibourtia tessmannii is a fairly large tree with a dense, rounded crown, growing to a height of about 40 m (130 ft). The trunk is straight and cylindrical, often with tall slender buttresses. It can be up to 2 m (6.6 ft) in diameter and is usually devoid of branches for about half of the tree's height. The greyish or brownish bark has circular scaly patches which become detached, leaving orange depressions. The leaves are arranged spirally and are pinnate, with one pair of ovate or elliptical leaflets, each up to 15 cm (6 in) in length. The inflorescence is a terminal or axillary panicle with thick stems clad in red hairs. The flowers are small, whitish and fragrant, with four sepals, no petals, ten stamens and a superior ovary. They are followed by slightly flattened, leathery pods up to 4 cm (2 in) long containing one or two large, kidney-shaped seeds with orange-red arils.

== Distribution and habitat ==
This tree is found in primary evergreen forests in Cameroon, Gabon and Equatorial Guinea.

== Uses ==
The wood of G. tessmannii is dense, hard and durable, the heartwood being reddish-brown with purplish streaking. The timber is harvested from the wild and sold under the trade name "bubinga". It is used for house construction as beams, joists, flooring, panelling and for other purposes. It is also used for making high-quality furniture, plywood, turning, containers, musical instruments and handicrafts. The wood has an attractive appearance and is often used for veneers.

The bark is much esteemed in traditional medicine and is often removed from living trees; it is sold at the markets of Yaoundé, Cameroon. A concoction of the bark is used to treat hypertension and gonorrhea, to prevent abortion, as an anthelmintic and to clean wounds. Various other claims are made for the bark including activity against typhoid fever and many other conditions. Another use is as a fungicide for controlling black pod disease in cocoa trees. The seeds are eaten by hornbills, monkeys and chimpanzees and these may serve to disperse the seed.
