= Guibourtia conjugata =

Conservation status
- Least Concern (IUCN 3.1)

Scientific classification
- Kingdom: Plantae
- Clade: Embryophytes
- Clade: Tracheophytes
- Clade: Angiosperms
- Clade: Eudicots
- Clade: Rosids
- Order: Fabales
- Family: Fabaceae
- Genus: Guibourtia
- Species: G. conjugata

Binomial name
- Guibourtia conjugata (B.)

Species of legume

Guibourtia conjugata is a species of small to medium-sized trees from family Fabaceae that can be found in Mozambique, Zambia and Zimbabwe. The plants are growing in woods and along the river banks of Limpopo and Mpumalanga. The plant is 9 meters tall, with the leaves that can range from 3–5 cm in length and are ovated and a bit curved. The plant's flowers are either white or yellow coloured and are 5 mm in diameter. Their apex is rounded and is hairless.
