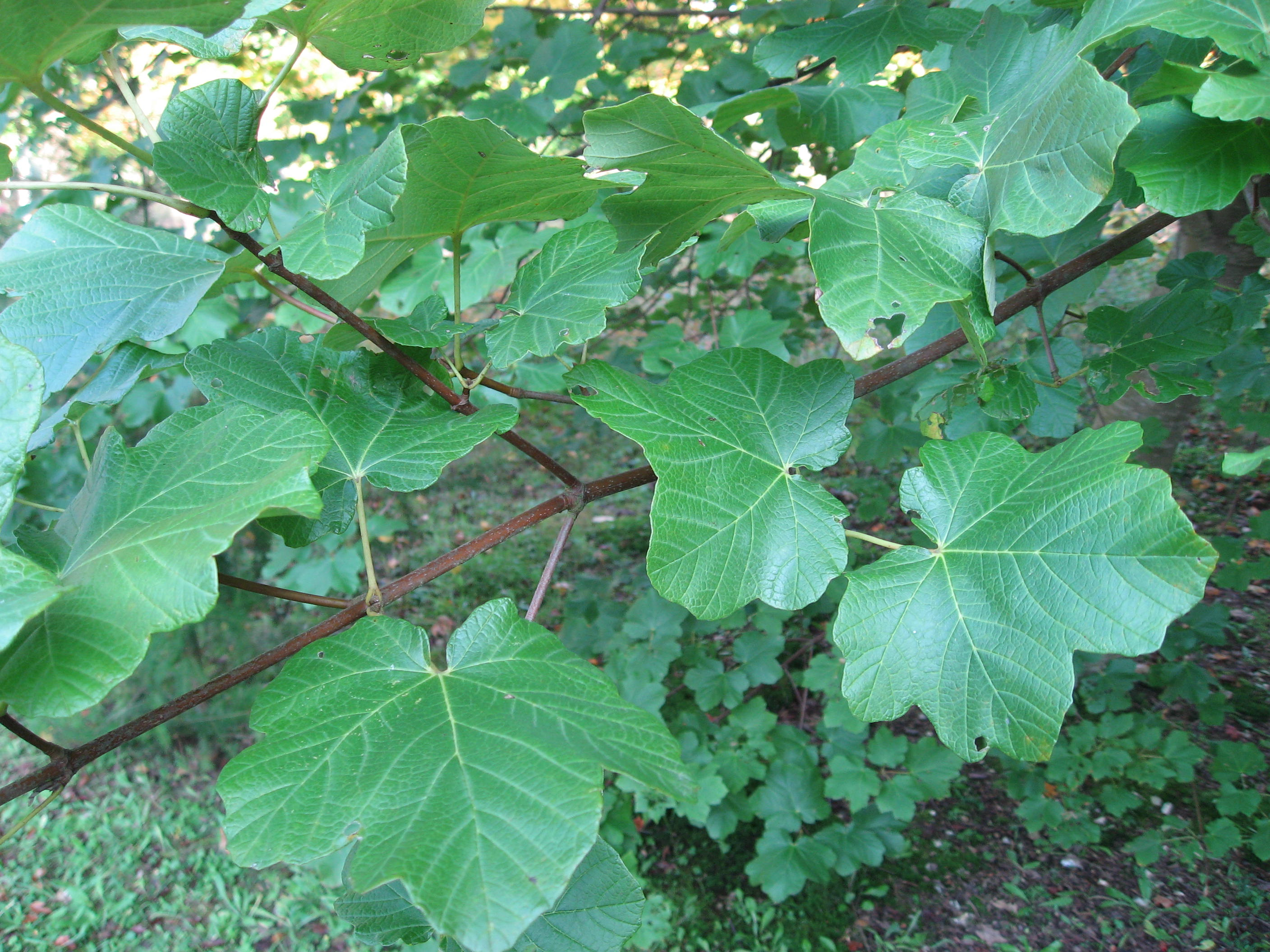
- Italian maple leaves in autumn

Scientific classification
- Kingdom: Plantae
- Clade: Embryophytes
- Clade: Tracheophytes
- Clade: Spermatophytes
- Clade: Angiosperms
- Clade: Eudicots
- Clade: Rosids
- Order: Sapindales
- Family: Sapindaceae
- Genus: Acer
- Section: Acer sect. Acer
- Series: Acer ser. Monspessulana
- Species: A. opalus

Binomial name
- Acer opalus Mill. 1768
- Distribution

Synonyms
- List: Acer hispanicum Pourr; Acer italum Lauth; Acer leptopterum Guss. Ex Nyman; Acer montanum Carradori ex Lam.; Acer opulifolium Chaix; Acer rotundifolium Lam.; Acer rupicolum Chabert; Acer sabaudum Chabert, name published without description

= Acer opalus =

Species of maple

Acer opalus, the Italian maple, is a species of maple in the soapberry family (Sapindaceae). This medium-sized tree is native to the hills and mountains of southern and western Europe, from the Balkans to Spain and north to the southwestern tip of Germany, and also in northwest Africa in Algeria.

== Description ==
Acer opalus is a medium-sized deciduous tree growing to 20 metres (66 ft) tall, with a trunk up to 1 m diameter. The leaves are glossy green, 7–13 centimetres (2.8–5.1 in) long and 5–16 centimetres (2.0–6.3 in) across, palmately lobed with blunt teeth. They turn yellow in autumn.

The bark is grey and pinkish. It peels in square plates. It has small yellow flowers that open before the leaves appear. The fruit is a pair of winged samaras, each seed up to 1 centimetre (0.39 in) in diameter with a 1.5–2.5 centimetres (0.59–0.98 in) wing.

=== Subspecies ===
The Italian maple has the following recognized subspecies:

- Acer opalus subsp. opalus: the lower leaf surfaces are pubescent mostly restricted to the primary veins. This maple grows from North Spain to western-South France including Corsica, in Switzerland up to Germany, in North Italy and very rare in North Algeria.
- Acer opalus subsp. obtusatum (Willd.) Gams, Balkan maple: it has shallowly obtuse lobe tips and persistently pubescent lower leaf surfaces. This maple grows from Centre-North Italy to Sicily, in Corsica, in western Balkan Peninsula extending to Greece, and also down to North Algeria.

These two subspecies was originally described as a separate species in 1806 but was reduced to subspecies status by 1925. The Spanish maple, Acer granatense Boiss., native to eastern Spain, Mallorca and northern Morocco, belongs to the Acer opalus complex and has been variously treated as Acer opalus subspecies by some authors.

== Distribution and habitat ==
This maple grows from sea level up to 2100 m a.s.l. It can form small pure stands or be mixed with other broadleaved species such as Quercus spp., Sorbus spp. and other Acer species. It prefers limestone soils, growing both on stony substrates and on well-developed soils.
