= Guibourtia schliebenii =

Conservation status
- Vulnerable (IUCN 3.1)

Scientific classification
- Kingdom: Plantae
- Clade: Tracheophytes
- Clade: Angiosperms
- Clade: Eudicots
- Clade: Rosids
- Order: Fabales
- Family: Fabaceae
- Genus: Guibourtia
- Species: G. schliebenii

Binomial name
- Guibourtia schliebenii (Harms) J.Leonard

Species of legume

Guibourtia schliebenii is a species of plant in the family Fabaceae. It is found in Mozambique and Tanzania.
