= Guibourtia ehie =

Conservation status
- Least Concern (IUCN 3.1)

Scientific classification
- Kingdom: Plantae
- Clade: Tracheophytes
- Clade: Angiosperms
- Clade: Eudicots
- Clade: Rosids
- Order: Fabales
- Family: Fabaceae
- Genus: Guibourtia
- Species: G. ehie

Binomial name
- Guibourtia ehie (A.Chev.) J.Léonard

Synonyms
- Copaifera ehie A.Chev

Species of legume

Guibourtia ehie is an evergreen tree of the genus Guibourtia in the family Fabaceae, also known by the common names amazique, amazoué, hyedua, black hyedua, mozambique, ovangkol and shedua.

== Description ==
Guibourtia ehie is native to tropical west Africa and grows in Cameroon, Gabon, Ghana, Ivory Coast, Liberia, and Nigeria. It grows in closed rain forests and transitional forests, often in small groups. It is threatened by habitat loss.

It grows to 30–45 m tall, with a trunk 60–90 cm diameter, heavily buttressed at the base, with smooth bark. The leaves are alternate, 5–10 cm long, divided into two leaflets with acuminate apices. The flowers are white, with four sepals and no petals. The fruit is a pod 4–6 cm long and 2.5–3.5 cm broad.

== Uses ==
It is used as a tropical hardwood for cabinetry, carving, flooring, joinery, musical instruments, and turnery. The wood is heavy, with a density of 0.85 g/cm^{3}. It is durable, and resistant to wood-boring insects. The wood provides high chatoyance, with an average value above 20 PZC.

It is sometimes used in guitar manufacturing in solid bodies and in the backs and sides of acoustic guitar bodies. It is a less expensive substitute for Indian rosewood, and is used by well-known guitar and bass manufacturers such as Martin, Takamine, Yamaha, Taylor, Epiphone, Breedlove Guitars, Warwick, Framus, Ibanez, Washburn Guitars, and Yairi.
