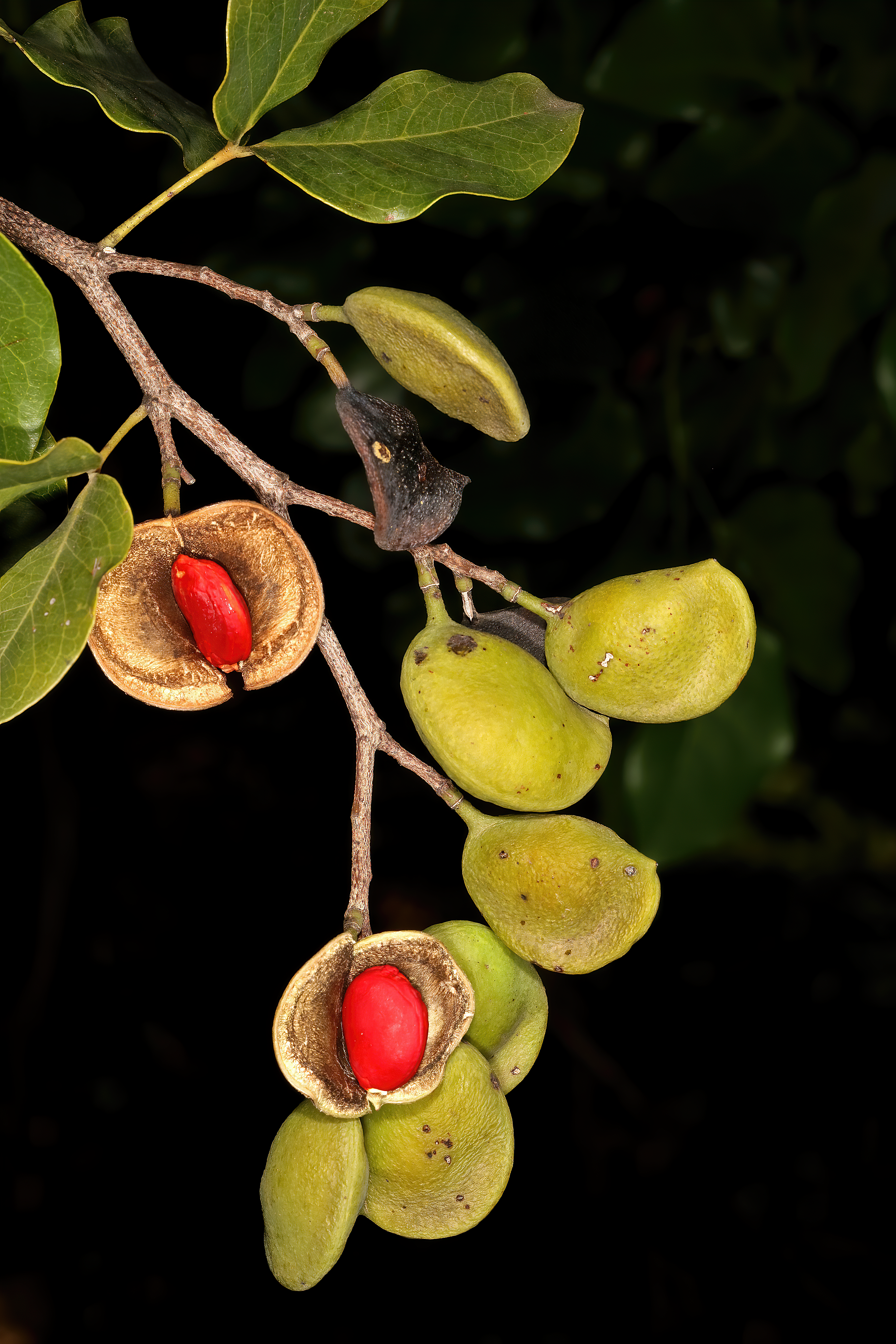
- Fruit of Guibourtia coleosperma
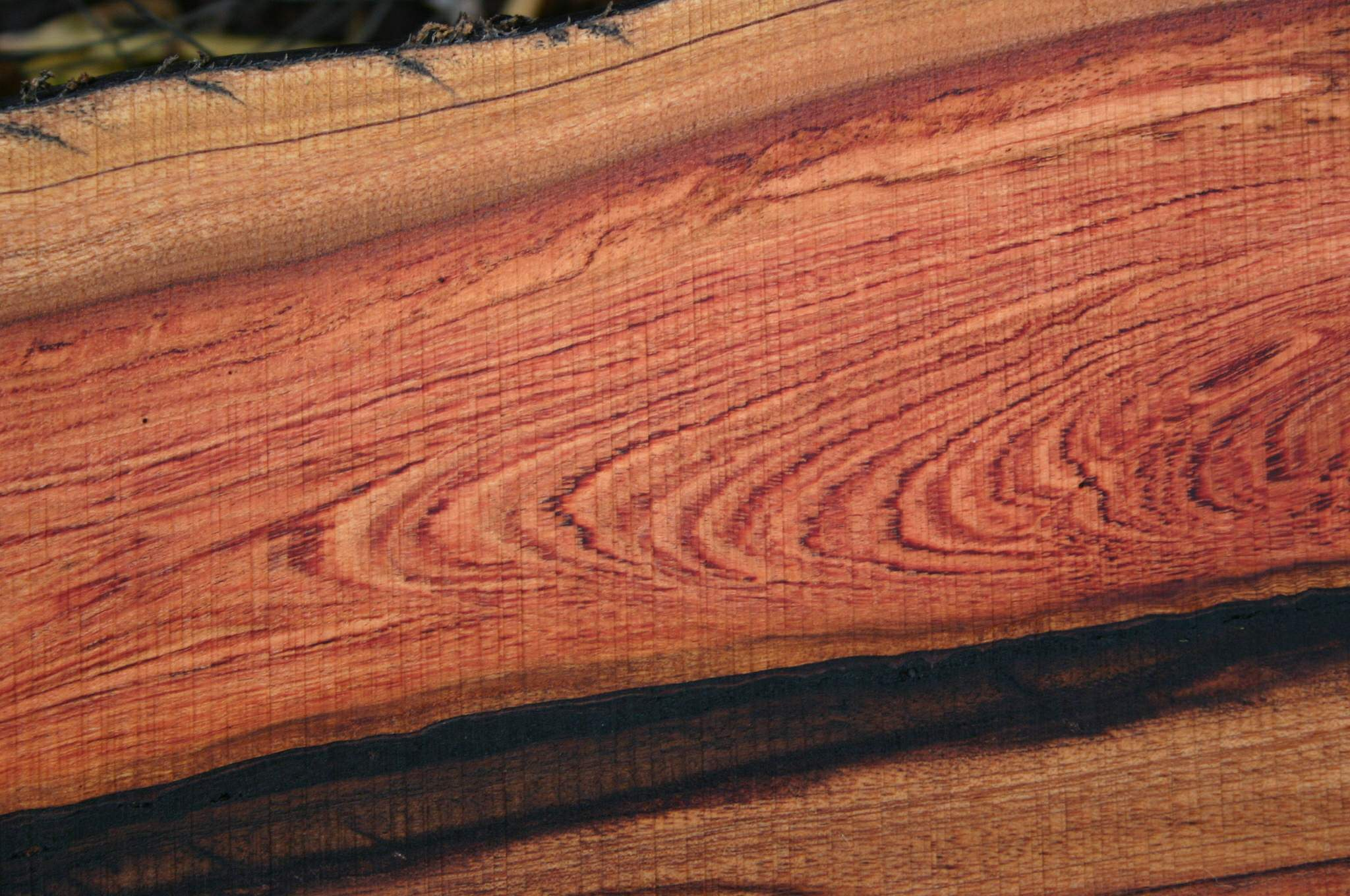
- Timber of Guibourtia coleosperma

Scientific classification
- Kingdom: Plantae
- Clade: Embryophytes
- Clade: Tracheophytes
- Clade: Spermatophytes
- Clade: Angiosperms
- Clade: Eudicots
- Clade: Rosids
- Order: Fabales
- Family: Fabaceae
- Subfamily: Detarioideae
- Tribe: Detarieae
- Genus: Guibourtia; Benn.

Species
- See text

Synonyms
- Gorskia Bolle; Pseudocopaiva Britton & P. Wilson

= Guibourtia =

Genus of tropical trees

Guibourtia is a flowering plant genus in the family Fabaceae, also known by the common names as Rhodesian copalwood, African Rosewood, amazique, bubinga, kevazingo, and ovangkol.

== Description ==
Guibourtia contains 16 species that are native to tropical regions of Africa (13 species) and South America (3 species). They occur in swampy or periodically inundated forests, as well as near rivers or at lakeshores.

The trees grow to 40–50 m tall, with a trunk diameter of 1–2 m, often with a heavily buttressed trunk.

== Species ==
Africa

- Guibourtia arnoldiana (De Wild. & T.Durand) J.Léonard – benge, benzi, bubinga, essingang, kevazingo, m'penze, mbenge, mutenye, olive walnut, ovang, waka
- Guibourtia carrissoana (M.A.Exell) J.Léonard – African rosewood
- Guibourtia coleosperma (Benth.) J.Léonard – African rosewood, false mopane, Rhodesian copal wood
- Guibourtia conjugata (Bolle) J.Léonard
- Guibourtia copallifera Benn.
- Guibourtia demeusei (Harms) J.Léonard – African rosewood, akume, Bubinga, ebana, essingang, kevazingo, kewazingo, okweni, ovang, waka
- Guibourtia dinklagei (Harms) J.Léonard
- Guibourtia ehie (A.Chev.) J.Léonard – amazakoue, amazoué, anokye, black hyedua, ehie, hyedua, hyeduanini, ovangkol, shedua
- Guibourtia leonensis J.Léonard
- Guibourtia pellegriniana J.Léonard – akume, bubinga, essingang, kevazingo, kevazingu, ovang, waka
- Guibourtia schliebenii (Harms) J.Léonard
- Guibourtia sousae J.Léonard
- Guibourtia tessmannii (Harms) J.Léonard – akume, bindinga, bubinga, essingang, kevazingo, ovang, waka

South America

- Guibourtia chodatiana (Hassl.) J.Léonard (sometimes included in G. hymenaefolia) – Tiete rosewood, Patagonian cherry, sirari
- Guibourtia confertiflora (Benth.) J.Léonard
- Guibourtia hymenaefolia (Moric.) J.Léonard – Tiete rosewood, Patagonian cherry, sirari

== Uses ==
The genus is used as tropical hardwood timber and is traded under the common names Bubinga, African rosewood, Amazoue, Amazique, Aevazingo, and Avangkol.

The timber is also used for inlays and in the manufacture of high-end furniture (especially by contemporary Arts and Crafts artists), on high-end woodworking tools such as the front knobs and rear handles of smooth planes, knife handles and medium-end tobacco pipes.

The timber is often used by luthiers for harps and other instruments, such as bass guitars, because of its mellow and well-rounded sound and the various range of grain patterns. Warwick Bass and Ibanez are known to use bubinga and ovangkol. It has been used in drum shells as well. Drum companies such as Tama offer various high-end drum kits with plies of Bubinga in the shells. Crafter also uses Bubinga on some instruments. Bubinga is also used in both acoustic and electric guitars for its figure and hardness.

Bubinga is also commonly used for the manufacture of some woodwind instruments, particularly high end recorders, because of its fine appearance and physical density.

Species of Guibourtia also produce Congo copal.
