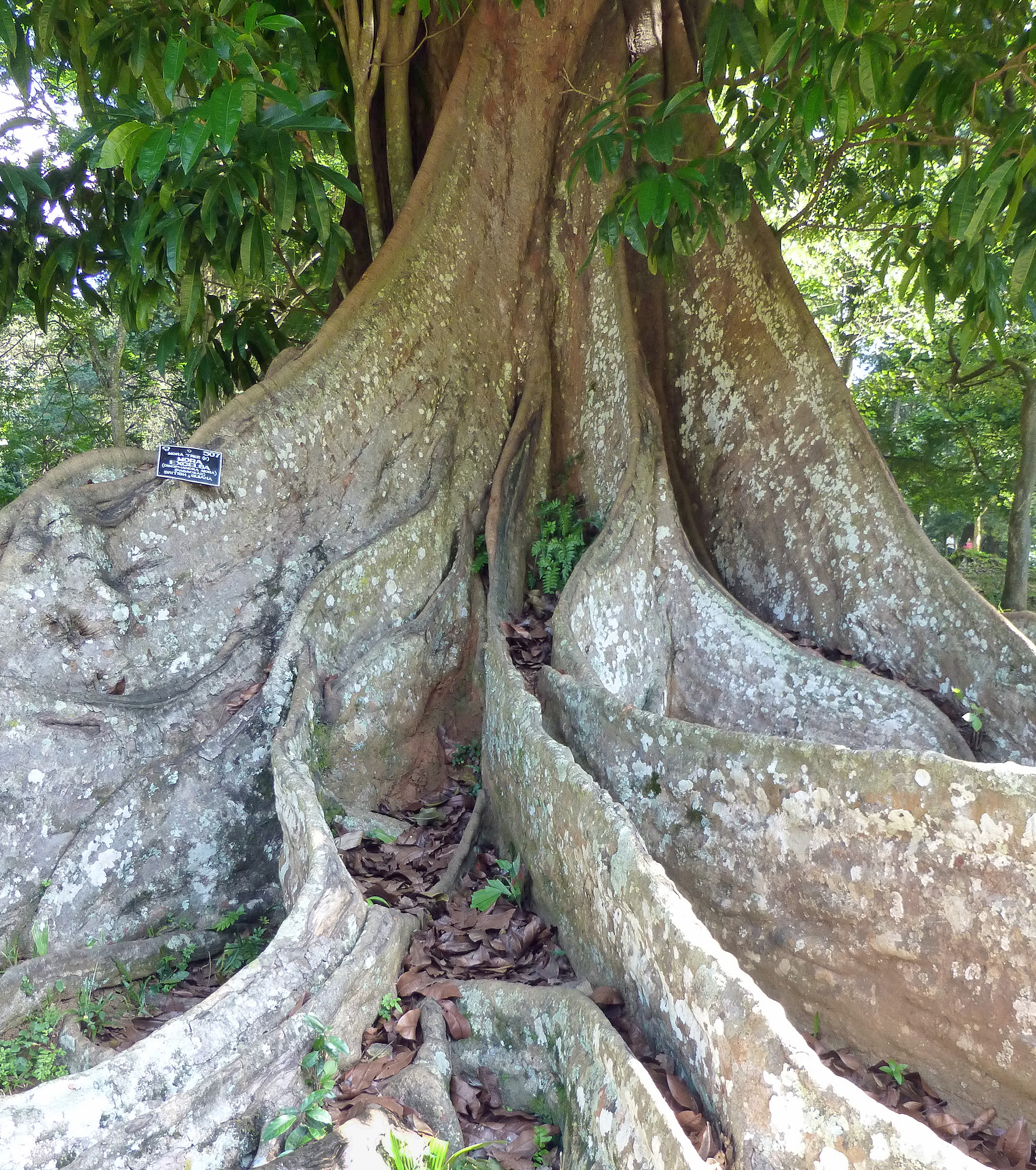
- Mora excelsa

Scientific classification
- Kingdom: Plantae
- Clade: Embryophytes
- Clade: Tracheophytes
- Clade: Angiosperms
- Clade: Eudicots
- Clade: Rosids
- Order: Fabales
- Family: Fabaceae
- Subfamily: Caesalpinioideae
- (unranked): Dimorphandra Group A
- Genus: Mora; Benth. (1839)

Species
- 6; see text

= Mora (plant) =

Genus of legumes

Mora is a genus of large trees in the subfamily Caesalpinioideae of the legume family Fabaceae (or in some classifications the family Caesalpinaceae of the order Fabales). There are six species, all native to lowland rainforests in northern South America, southern Central America, the southern Caribbean islands, and Hispaniola.

== Species ==
Six species are accepted by the Plants of the World Online database:

- Mora abbottii Britton & Rose – cola tree, coi, col (Dominican Republic)
- Mora ekmanii (Urb.) Britton & Rose – (Hispaniola: Dominican Republic, Haiti)
- Mora excelsa Benth. – nato, nato rojo, mora (Trinidad and Tobago, Guyana, Suriname, Venezuela)
- Mora gonggrijpii (Kleinhoonte) Sandwith – Moraboekea (Guyana, Suriname, Venezuela)
- Mora oleifera (Hemsl.) Ducke – (Panama, Colombia)
- Mora paraensis (Ducke) Ducke – pracuuba (Brazil)

== Description ==
These are large, heavily buttressed rainforest trees up to 40 m (131 ft) in height, to 60 m (197 ft) in the case of Mora excelsa. The genus is noted for the exceptional size of its beans, which are among the largest known dicot seeds, in the instance of Mora oleifera being up to 18 cm (7 in) long, 15 cm (6 in) in breadth and 8 cm (3 in) thick, and a weight of up to 1 kg (2.2 lb). These very large beans develop out of tiny flowers with a pistil only 1 mm wide. The species Mora excelsa is one of the few rainforest trees to grow in pure stands.

== Uses ==
The beans of Mora spp. are edible if boiled, and are also the source of a red dyestuff. Some of the species are important for timber production. Mora excelsa and Mora gonggrijpii are also known as nato, and are commonly used in guitar body and neck construction.
