= Nyatoh =

Hardwood trade name

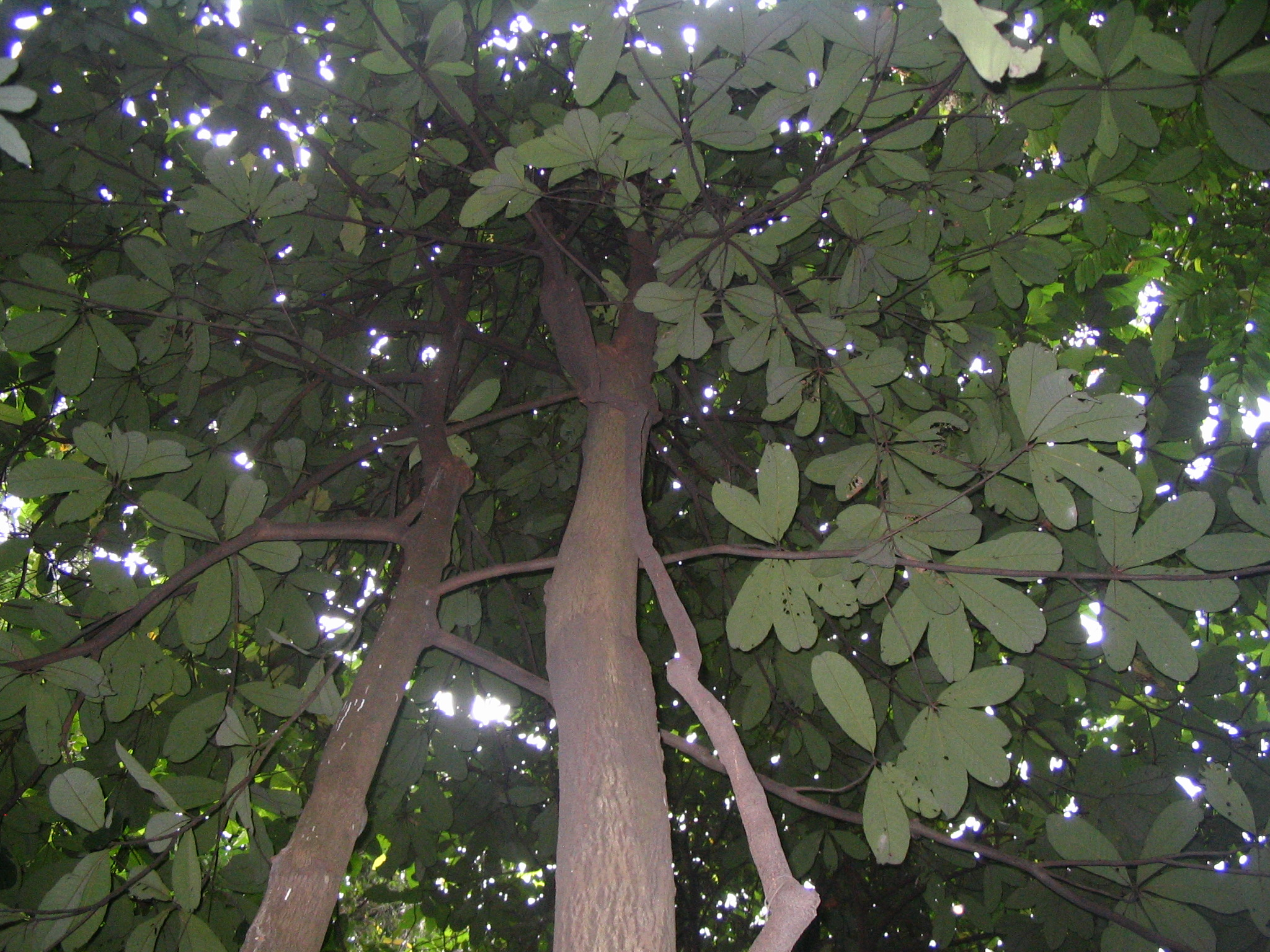
Palaquium maingayi -Niatoh tembaya

Nyatoh is a trade-name for wood of a number of hardwood species of the genera Palaquium and Payena growing in rainforest environments in southeast Asia, especially in Indonesia and the Philippines. Nyatoh wood is reddish and most species are easy to work with as it stains and polishes well. It has a tight straight grain that resembles cherry wood. The surface is dark-brown/red in color.

== Sustainability ==
Nyatoh is generally perceived as a sustainable resource. However, several species within the related genera of Palaquium and Payena are on the IUCN Red List due to overexploitation and alarming reductions in their habitats.

The harvesting and sales of nyatoh has been criticized by some environmental groups, who have won agreements in the United States to not resell the wood from various furniture and home-improvement chains.
