= Chongor =

Chongor or Changar (Persian: چنگر) may refer to:

- Chongor-e Jalilvand
- Chongor-e Saminvand
