= Simani, Iran =

Simani (Persian: سيماني) in Iran may refer to:

- Simani-ye Olya
- Simani-ye Sofla
