= Suran =

Suran may refer to:

== Places ==
=== Iran ===
- Suran, Ardabil, a village in Iran
- Suran, Isfahan, a village in Iran
- Suran-e Olya, a village in Kermanshah Province, Iran
- Suran-e Sofla, a village in Kermanshah Province, Iran
- Suran, Kohgiluyeh and Boyer-Ahmad, a village in Kohgiluyeh and Boyer-Ahmad Province, Iran
- Suran, Lorestan, a village in Lorestan Province, Iran
- Suran, Markazi, a village in Markazi Province, Iran
- Suran, Taybad, a village in Razavi Khorasan Province, Iran
- Suran, Torqabeh and Shandiz, a village in Razavi Khorasan Province, Iran
- Suran, Sistan and Baluchestan, a city in Iran

=== Syria ===
- Suran, Aleppo Governorate, a town in Syria near Aleppo
- Suran, Hama Governorate, a town in Syria near Hama

== Other uses ==
- Suran (singer), a South Korean singer
- SURAN, the Survivable Radio Network project
- Volkswagen Suran, a station wagon also called the SpaceFox
- Amorphophallus paeoniifolius or Elephant's foot yam, a tropical tuber

== See also ==
- Suren (disambiguation)
