= Philippine mahogany =

Philippine mahogany is a common name for several different species of trees and their wood.

- Botanically, the name refers to Toona calantas in the mahogany family, Meliaceae. It is endemic to the Philippines.
- In the US timber trade, it is often applied to wood of the genus Shorea in the family Dipterocarpaceae.
- Rarely, it may also refer to the narra tree (Pterocarpus indicus) in the legume family, Fabaceae.
