= Suren (disambiguation) =

Suren, also rendered as Sûrên or Soren or Sorena or historically Latinized as Surena, is a given name of Iranian origin, used commonly amongst Iranians and Armenians, and means "strong, the heroic one".

It may also refer to:

== Persons named Suren or Soren ==
Surname

- Surena, 1st-century BC Parthian general
- Chihor-Vishnasp Suren, a 6th-century AD governor of Armenia
- Walter Surén (1880-1976), German general

Given name

- Suren Pahlav, 5th-century Iranian nobleman
- Surin (Nestorian Patriarch), an 8th-century patriarch of the Church of the East
- Suren Shadunts (1898–1938), Soviet-Tajikistani communist leader of Armenian descent
- Suren Arakelov (born 1947), Russian mathematician of Armenian descent
- Suren Spandaryan (1882–1916), Armenian author and revolutionary
- Suren Aghababyan (1922-1986), Armenian literary critic
- Suren Yeremian (1908-1992), Armenian historian and cartographer
- Suren Nalbandyan (b. 1956), Armenian Greco-Roman wrestler
- Suren Markosyan (b. 1984), Armenian Freestyle wrestler
- Suren Raghavan, Sri Lankan academic
- Suren Spandaryan (1882-1916), Armenian literature critic, publicist and Bolshevik
- Suren Khachatryan (b. 1956), Armenian politician

Nickname

- Stepan Shaumian (1878–1918, nicknamed "Suren"), Armenian Bolshevik revolutionary and politician

=== Fictional characters ===
- Soren, fictional character in the 2003 film The Matrix Reloaded
- Soren, fictional mage in the 2005 video game Fire Emblem: Path of Radiance
- Soren (Guardians of Ga'Hoole), fictional character in the Guardians of Ga'Hoole books by Kathryn Lasky
- Soren Lorensen, fictional character in the Charlie and Lola books by Lauren Child
- Soren (Underworld), fictional character in the Underworld series of books and films
- Soren, fictional character in the 2004 film The Prince and Me
- Soren the Architect, fictional character on Minecraft: Story Mode
- Suren, fictional character in the book series "La saga de Avalon de Trivia"

== Other uses ==
- Surena (robot), an Iranian humanoid robot, named after the Parthian General Surena
- Surenavan, a town in Armenia
- Samand Soren, a car made by Iran's IKCO car company
- House of Suren, a Parthian noble family in antiquity

== See also ==
- Suren toon, a species of tree
- Faruk Süren (born 1945), Turkish businessman
- Søren, a Scandinavian given name
- Soren (disambiguation)
- Suran (disambiguation)
