= Valakehvand =

Valakehvand ولكه وند
- Village
- Location within Iran
- Coordinates: 34°14′39″N 46°32′52″E
- Country: Iran
- Province: Kermanshah
- County: Eslamabad-e Gharb
- Bakhsh: Central
- Rural District: Howmeh-ye Shomali

Population (2006)
  - Total: 224
- Time zone: UTC+3:30 (IRST)
  - Summer (DST): UTC+4:30 (IRDT)

Valakehvand (Persian: ولكه وند, also Romanized as Valakvand) is a village in Howmeh-ye Shomali Rural District, in the Central District of Eslamabad-e Gharb County, Kermanshah Province, Iran. At the 2006 census, its population was 224, in 48 families.
