= Cheshmeh Palang =

Cheshmeh Palang چشمه پلنگ
- Village
- Location within Iran
- Coordinates: 34°13′17″N 46°34′10″E
- Country: Iran
- Province: Kermanshah
- County: Eslamabad-e Gharb
- Bakhsh: Central
- Rural District: Howmeh-ye Shomali

Population (2006)
  - Total: 52
- Time zone: UTC+3:30 (IRST)
  - Summer (DST): UTC+4:30 (IRDT)

Cheshmeh Palang (Persian: چشمه پلنگ; also known as Cheshmeh Halang) is a village in Howmeh-ye Shomali Rural District, in the Central District of Eslamabad-e Gharb County, Kermanshah Province, Iran. At the 2006 census, its population was 52, in 9 families.
