= Barah Sileh =

Barah Sileh بره سيله
- Village
- Location within Iran
- Coordinates: 34°11′29″N 46°34′02″E
- Country: Iran
- Province: Kermanshah
- County: Eslamabad-e Gharb
- Bakhsh: Central
- Rural District: Howmeh-ye Shomali

Population (2006)
  - Total: 359
- Time zone: UTC+3:30 (IRST)
  - Summer (DST): UTC+4:30 (IRDT)

Barah Sileh (Persian: بره سيله, also Romanized as Barah Sīleh) is a village in Howmeh-ye Shomali Rural District, in the Central District of Eslamabad-e Gharb County, Kermanshah Province, Iran. At the 2006 census, its population was 359, in 70 families.
