= Badrehi =

Badrehi بدره اي
- Village
- Location within Iran
- Coordinates: 34°06′31″N 46°33′11″E
- Country: Iran
- Province: Kermanshah
- County: Eslamabad-e Gharb
- Bakhsh: Central
- Rural District: Howmeh-ye Shomali

Population (2006)
  - Total: 2,024
- Time zone: UTC+3:30 (IRST)
  - Summer (DST): UTC+4:30 (IRDT)

Badrehi (Persian: بدره اي, also Romanized as Badreh'ī and Badrah’ī; also known as Badra’ī) is a village in Howmeh-ye Shomali Rural District, in the Central District of Eslamabad-e Gharb County, Kermanshah Province, Iran. At the 2006 census, its population was 2,024, in 481 families.
