= Molla Amirkhan =

Molla Amirkhan مله اميرخان
- Village
- Location within Iran
- Coordinates: 34°19′30″N 46°31′41″E
- Country: Iran
- Province: Kermanshah
- County: Eslamabad-e Gharb
- Bakhsh: Central
- Rural District: Howmeh-ye Shomali

Population (2006)
  - Total: 49
- Time zone: UTC+3:30 (IRST)
  - Summer (DST): UTC+4:30 (IRDT)

Molla Amirkhan (Persian: مله اميرخان, also Romanized as Molla Amīrkhān) is a village in Howmeh-ye Shomali Rural District, in the Central District of Eslamabad-e Gharb County, Kermanshah Province, Iran. At the 2006 census, its population was 49, in 15 families.
