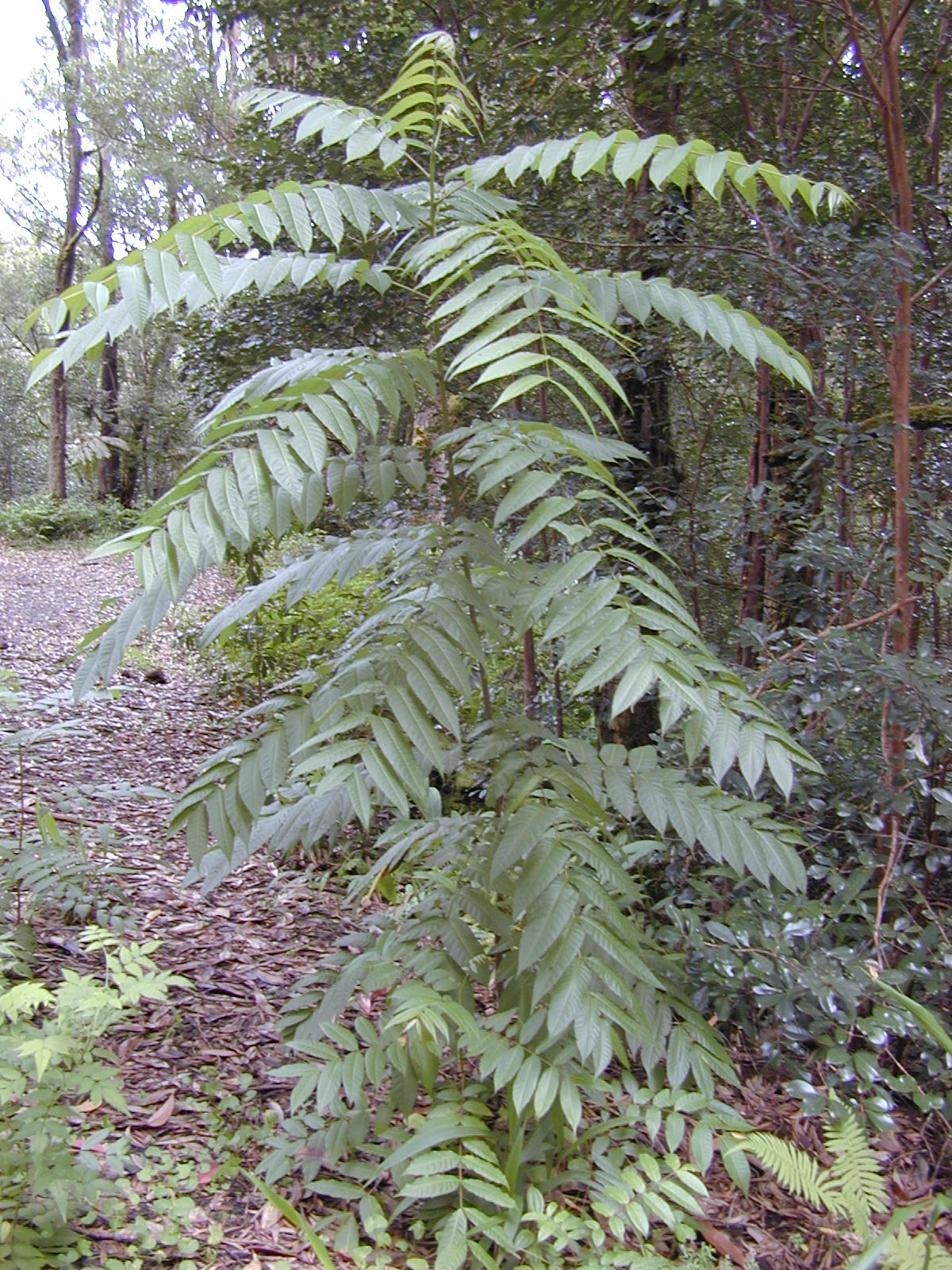
- Small specimen of Toona ciliata

Conservation status
- Least Concern (IUCN 3.1)

Scientific classification
- Kingdom: Plantae
- Clade: Tracheophytes
- Clade: Angiosperms
- Clade: Eudicots
- Clade: Rosids
- Order: Sapindales
- Family: Meliaceae
- Genus: Toona
- Species: T. ciliata

Binomial name
- Toona ciliata M.Roem.

Synonyms
- 89 synonyms: Homotypic synonyms; Cedrela australis Mudie; Cedrela toona Roxb. ex Rottler & Willd.; Surenus toona (Roxb. ex Rottler & Willd.) Kuntze; Swietenia toona (Roxb. ex Rottler & Willd.) Stokes; Heterotypic synonyms; Dracontomelon multijugum (Kurz) Radlk. ex C.DC.; Cedrela australis F.Muell.; Cedrela brevipetiolulata Haines; Cedrela febrifuga var. cochinchinensis (Pierre) C.DC.; Cedrela febrifuga f. ternatensis Miq.; Cedrela hainesii C.DC.; Cedrela hexandra Wall.; Cedrela kingii C.DC.; Cedrela kingii var. birmanica C.DC.; Cedrela mannii C.DC.; Cedrela microcarpa C.DC.; Cedrela mollis Hand.-Mazz.; Cedrela multijuga Kurz; Cedrela serrulata Miq.; Cedrela teysmannii Hassk.; Cedrela toona var. australis (Kuntze) C.DC.; Cedrela toona var. cuspidata C.DC.; Cedrela toona var. deccana C.DC.; Cedrela toona var. gamblei C.DC.; Cedrela toona var. grandiflora C.DC.; Cedrela toona var. hainesii (C.DC.) Haines; Cedrela toona var. haslettii Haines; Cedrela toona var. latifolia C.DC.; Cedrela toona var. listeri C.DC.; Cedrela toona var. multijuga (Kurz) Haines; Cedrela toona var. nepalensis C.DC.; Cedrela toona var. parviflora Benth.; Cedrela toona var. pilipetala C.DC.; Cedrela toona var. pilistaminea C.DC.; Cedrela toona var. puberula C.DC.; Cedrela toona var. pubescens Franch.; Cedrela toona var. pubinervis C.DC.; Cedrela toona var. stracheyi C.DC.; Cedrela toona var. sublaxiflora C.DC.; Cedrela toona var. talbotii C.DC.; Cedrela toona var. vestita C.T.White; Cedrela toona var. warburgii C.DC.; Cedrela toona var. yunnanensis C.DC.; Cedrela tuna Oken; Surenus australis Kuntze; Surenus microcarpa (C.DC.) Kuntze; Surenus serrulata (Miq.) Kuntze; Surenus teysmannii (Hassk.) Kuntze; Toona australis (Kuntze) Harms; Toona ciliata var. australis (Kuntze) Bahadur; Toona ciliata var. brevipetiolulata (Haines) S.C.Mishra & Panigrahi; Toona ciliata var. hainesii (C.DC.) Panigrahi & S.C.Mishra; Toona ciliata var. haslettii (Haines) Bahadur; Toona ciliata var. hexandra (M.Roem.) Bahadur; Toona ciliata var. kingii (C.DC.) Bahadur; Toona ciliata var. latifolia (C.DC.) Chandrab.; Toona ciliata var. listeri (C.DC.) Bahadur; Toona ciliata var. mollis (Hand.-Mazz.) Bahadur; Toona ciliata var. multijuga (Kurz) Panigrahi & S.C.Mishra; Toona ciliata subsp. nepalensis (C.DC.) Panigrahi; Toona ciliata var. parviflora (Benth.) Bahadur; Toona ciliata var. pilipetala (C.DC.) N.C.Nair & Kumari; Toona ciliata var. pubescens (Franch.) Hand.-Mazz.; Toona ciliata var. pubinervis (C.DC.) Bahadur; Toona ciliata var. sublaxiflora (C.DC.) C.Y.Wu; Toona ciliata var. vestita (C.T.White) Bahadur; Toona ciliata var. yunnanensis (C.DC.) C.Y.Wu; Toona febrifuga var. cochinchinensis Pierre; Toona febrifuga var. griffithiana Pierre; Toona febrifuga var. ternatensis Pierre; Toona hainesii (C.DC.) Harms; Toona hexandra M.Roem.; Toona hexandra var. gamblei (C.DC.) S.M.Almeida & M.R.Almeida; Toona hexandra var. griffithiana (Pierre) S.M.Almeida & M.R.Almeida; Toona hexandra var. haslettii (Haines) S.M.Almeida & M.R.Almeida; Toona hexandra var. kingii (C.DC.) S.M.Almeida & M.R.Almeida; Toona hexandra var. listeri (C.DC.) S.M.Almeida & M.R.Almeida; Toona hexandra var. mollis (Hand.-Mazz.) S.M.Almeida & M.R.Almeida; Toona hexandra var. parviflora (Benth.) S.M.Almeida & M.R.Almeida; Toona hexandra var. pubinervis (C.DC.) S.M.Almeida & M.R.Almeida; Toona kingii (C.DC.) Harms; Toona mannii (C.DC.) Harms; Toona microcarpa (C.DC.) Harms; Toona microcarpa var. pilipetala (C.DC.) Bahadur; Toona mollis (Hand.-Mazz.) A.Chev.; Toona serrulata (Miq.) Harms; Toona sureni var. cochinchinensis (Pierre) Bahadur; Toona sureni var. pubescens (Franch.) Chun ex F.C.How & T.C.Chen; Toona sureni var. teysmannii (Hassk.) Bahadur; Toona ternatensis (Miq.) Bahadur

= Toona ciliata =

Species of tree

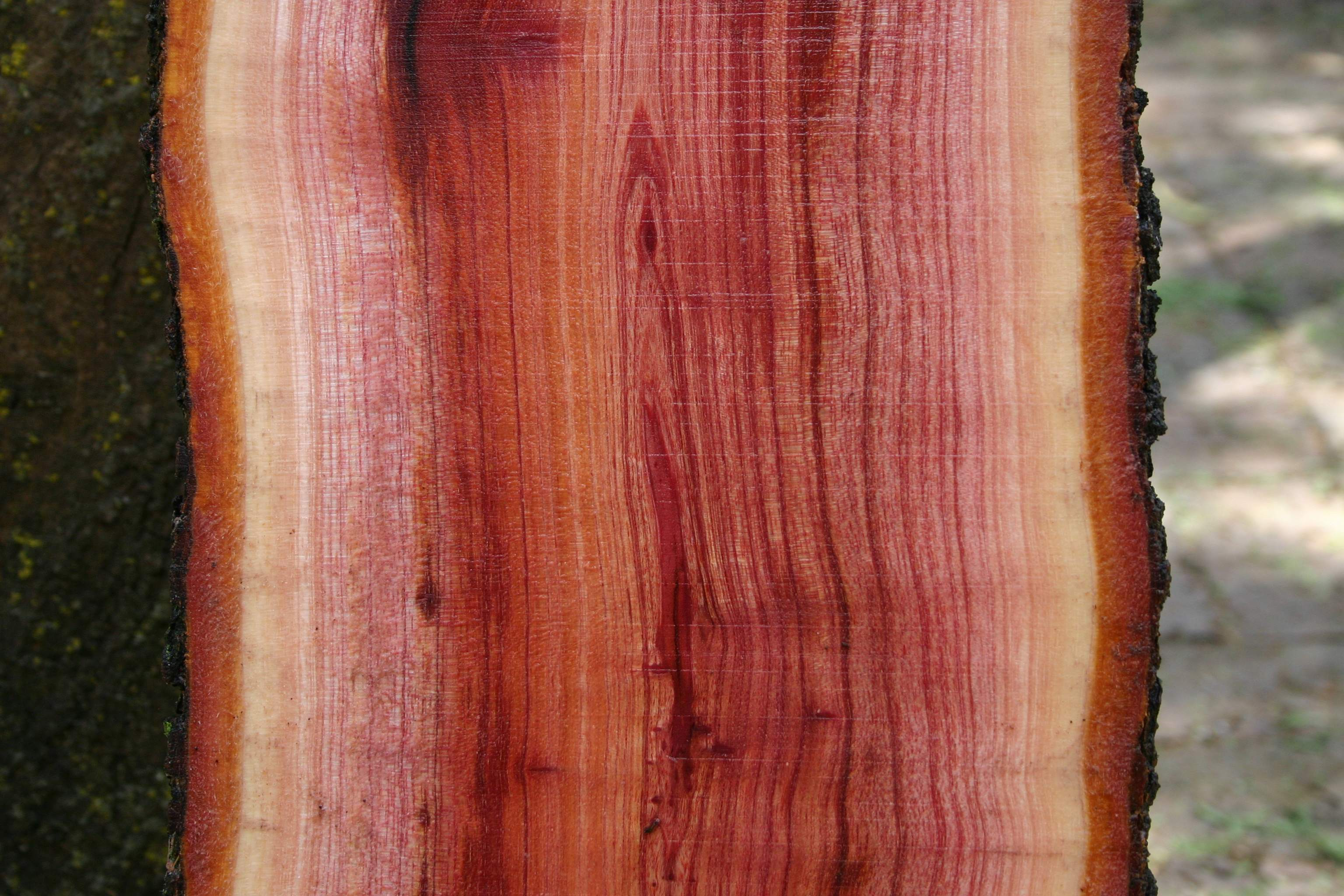
Freshly cut Toona ciliata plank

Toona ciliata is a forest tree in the mahogany family which grows throughout South Asia from Pakistan to Papua New Guinea and Australia.

== Description ==
The tree has extended compound leaves up to 90 cm with 10-14 pairs of leaflets which are narrow and taper towards the tip. Each leaflet is between 4.5 and 16 cm long. The species can grow to around 60 m (200 ft) in height and its trunk can reach 3 m (10 ft) in girth with large branches that create a spreading crown. It is one of Australia's few native deciduous trees, with the leaves falling in autumn (late March) and growing back in spring (early September). The new leaf growth is reddish pink in colour.

The tree produces masses of white flowers that are very small and tubular in shape. The fruits are green capsules which senesces to a brown colour and tear open into star shape to release seeds, which are small and winged.

== Distribution ==
It is native to the following regions as defined in the World Geographical Scheme for Recording Plant Distributions:

- Indian Subcontinent – Assam, Bangladesh, East Himalaya, India, Nepal, Pakistan, West Himalaya
- China – China South-Central, China Southeast, Hainan
- Indo-China – Cambodia, Laos, Myanmar, Thailand, Vietnam
- Malesia – Borneo, Jawa, Lesser Sunda Islands, Malaya, Maluku, Philippines, Sulawesi, Sumatera, Christmas Islands
- Papuasia – Bismarck Archipelago, New Guinea
- Australia – New South Wales, Queensland

== Habitat ==
In Australia, the tree's natural habitat is subtropical forests of New South Wales and Queensland, much of which has been extensively cleared. The Australian population was formerly treated as a distinct species under the name Toona australis. The southernmost limit of natural distribution is on basaltic soils, growing west of the Princes Highway near the village of Termeil, south of Ulladulla, southern Illawarra, New South Wales. The largest recorded T. ciliata tree in Australia grew near Nulla Nulla Creek, west of Kempsey, New South Wales and was felled in 1883.

It grows best in an environment with high light levels, however in the relative darkness of the rainforest understorey, it is less susceptible to attack by the cedar tip moth. The cedar tip moth lays its eggs on the tree's leading shoot, allowing the larvae to burrow into the stem. This causes dieback and a multi-branched tree with little commercial value. The tree exudes a chemical that the female cedar tip moth seeks out. This moth does not attack commercial plantings of Asian/African/Australian native meliaceae in South America. As a result, successful planting of Toona ciliata is being observed in many parts of Brazil, including genetic improvement and clonal production.

== Names ==
It is commonly known as the red cedar (a name shared by other trees), tone, toon or toona (also applied to other members of the genus Toona), Australian red cedar, Burma cedar, Indian cedar, Moulmein cedar or the Queensland red cedar. It is also known as Indian mahogany. Indigenous Australian names include Polai in the Illawarra. Woolia on the Richmond River, Mamin & Mugurpul near Brisbane, and Woota at Wide Bay. Also called Ai saria in Timor-Leste.

== Uses ==
The timber is red in colour, easy to work and very highly valued. It was used extensively for furniture, wood panelling and construction, including shipbuilding, and was referred to as "red gold" by Australian settlers. Heavily and unsustainably exploited in the 19th and early 20th centuries, almost all the large trees have been cut out and the species is essentially commercially extinct. Availability of this timber is now limited. Timber is currently also harvested in New Guinea. Although it is not generally a viable plantation species, trees are regularly harvested by Forestry in the Atherton region of Queensland.

== Other areas ==
The red cedar is widely planted in subtropical and tropical parts of the world as a shade tree and for its fast-growing aspect. It is grown in the Hawaiian Islands of the United States, and southern and eastern Africa. In parts of Zimbabwe and South Africa, it has naturalised; growing to maturity and spreading from seed.

== Reproduction and dispersal ==
Toona ciliata reproduces by seed. It is a prolific seed producer and establishes readily.

== Gallery ==
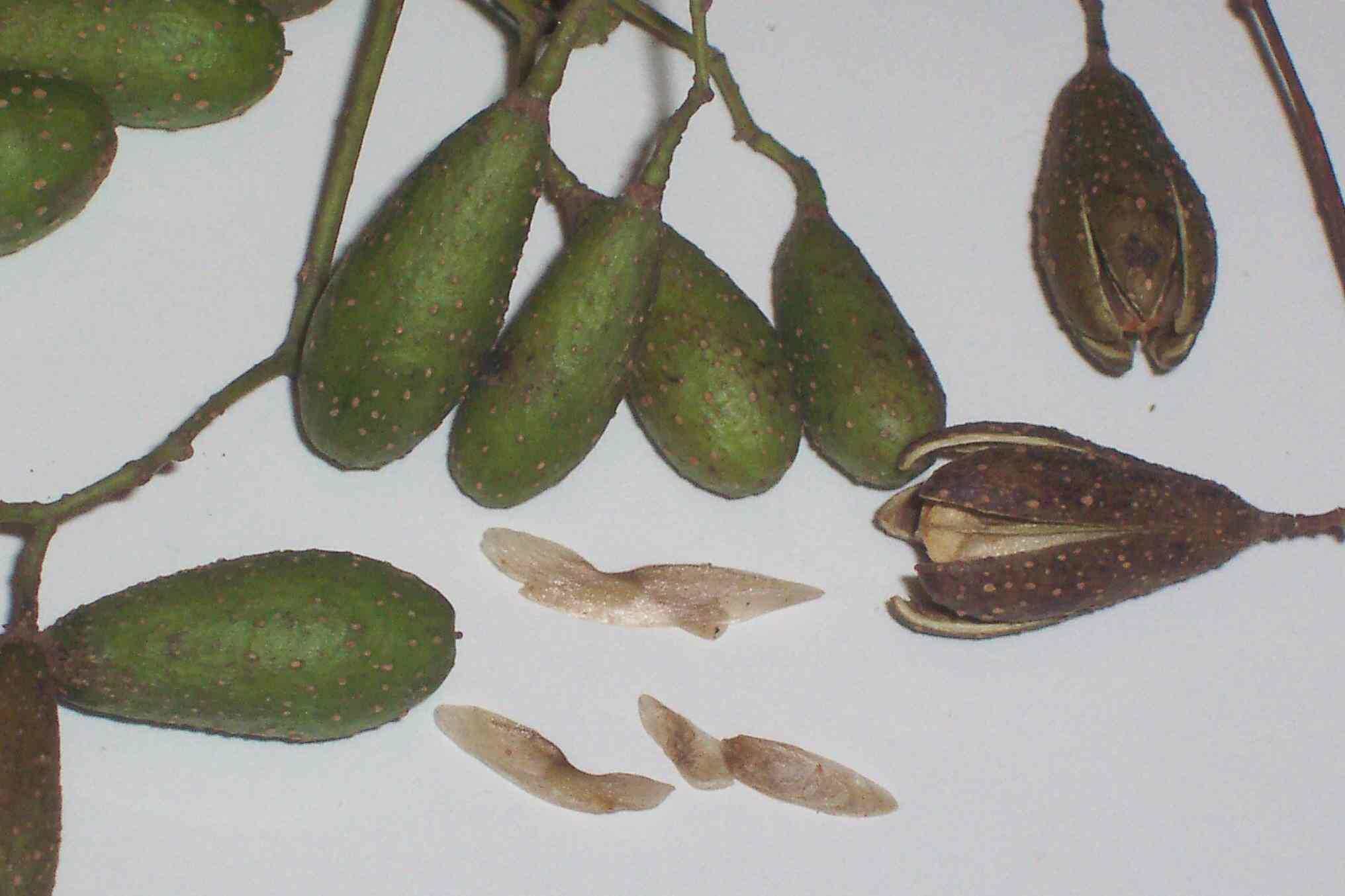
Toona ciliata - capsules and seeds

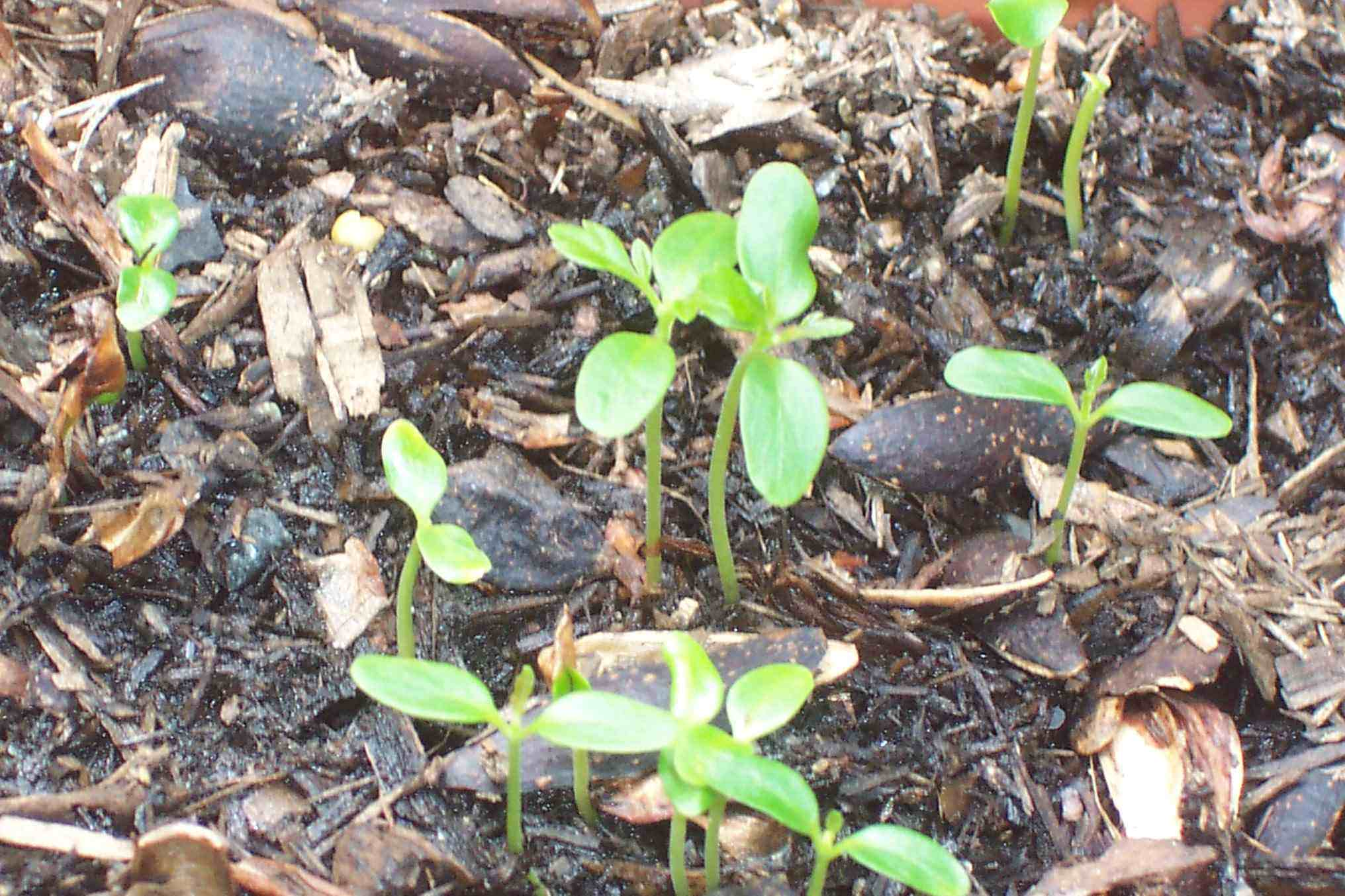
Toona ciliata - germinating seeds

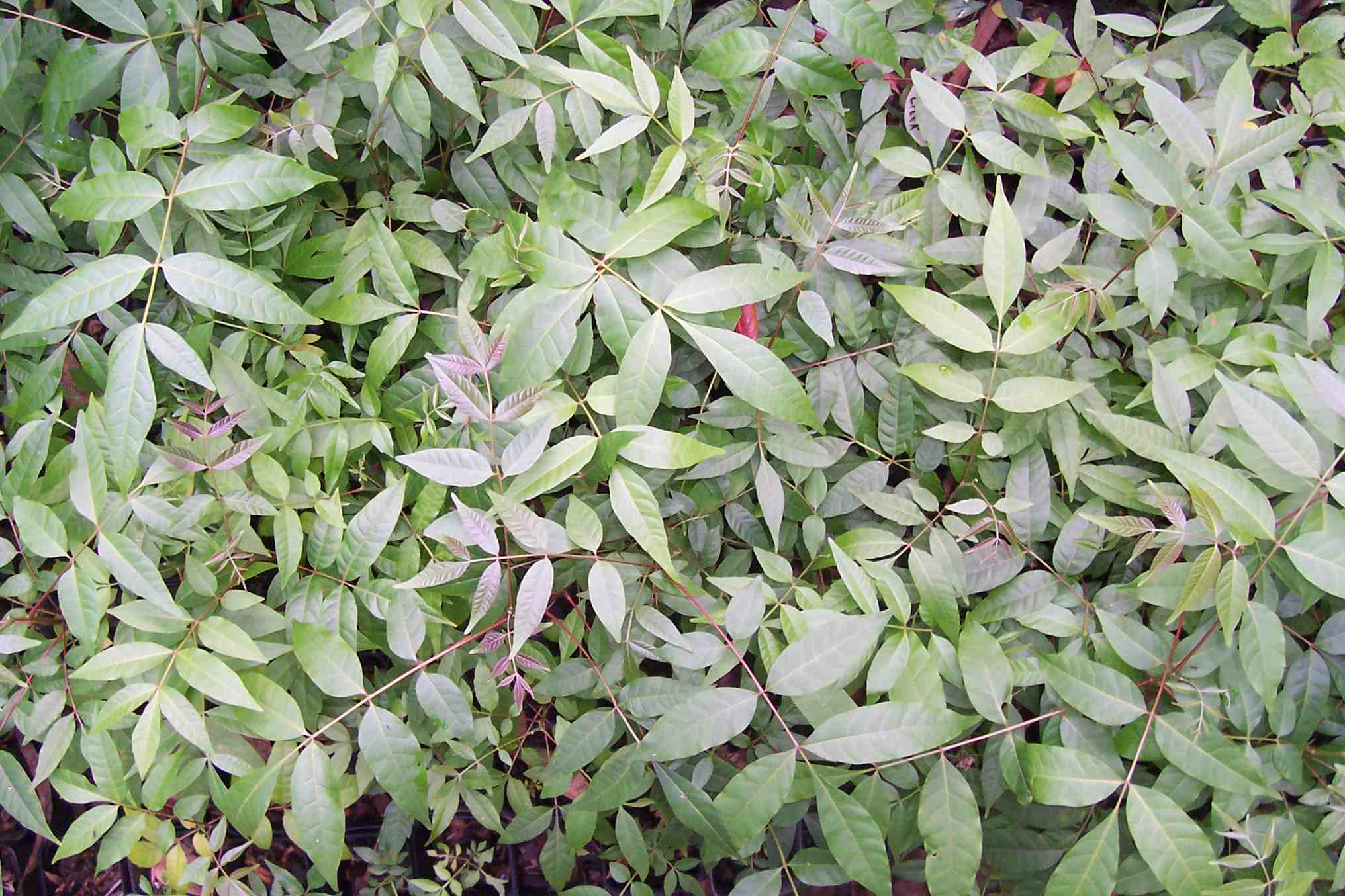
Toona ciliata - seedlings

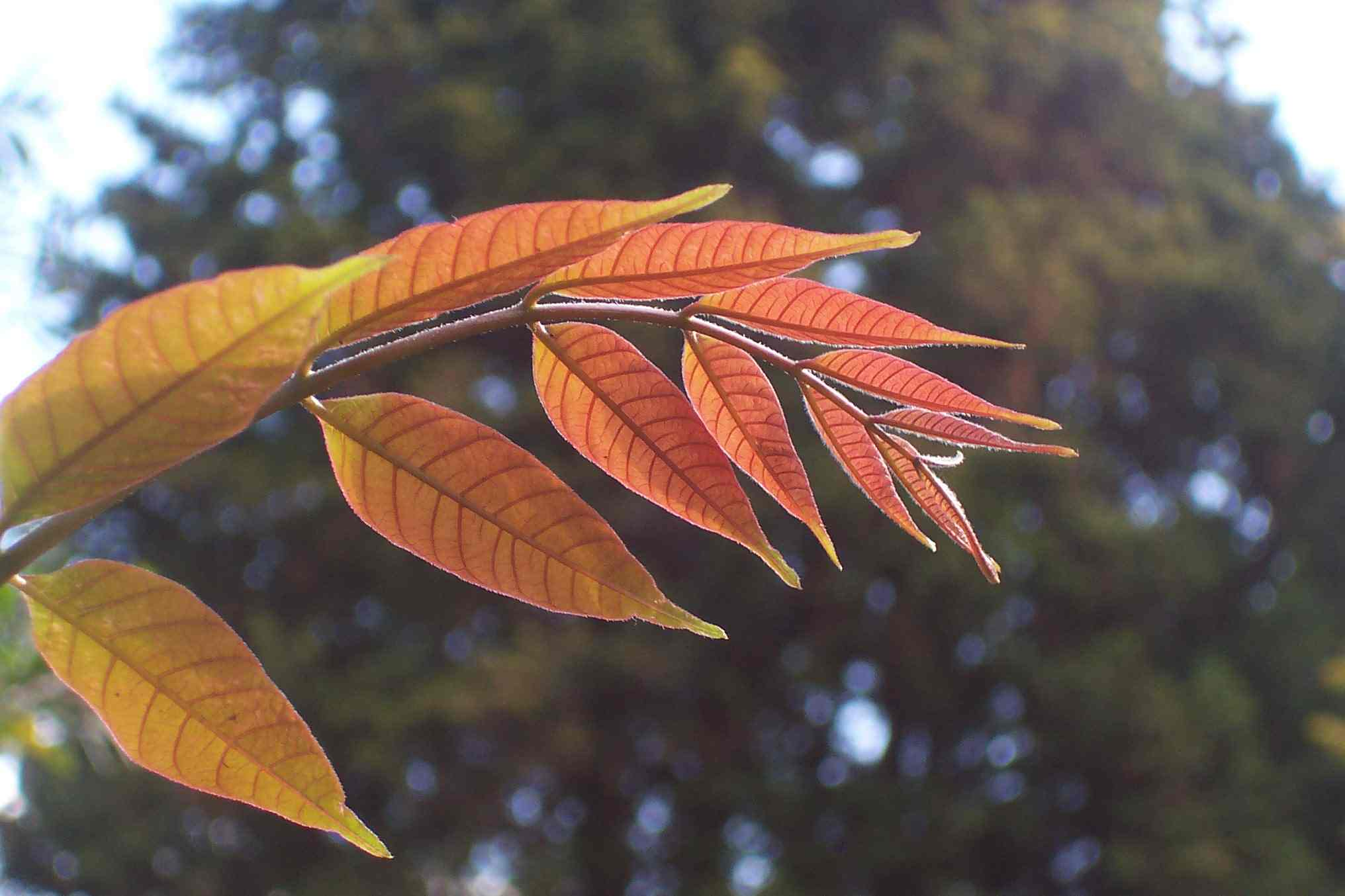
Toona ciliata - red leaves

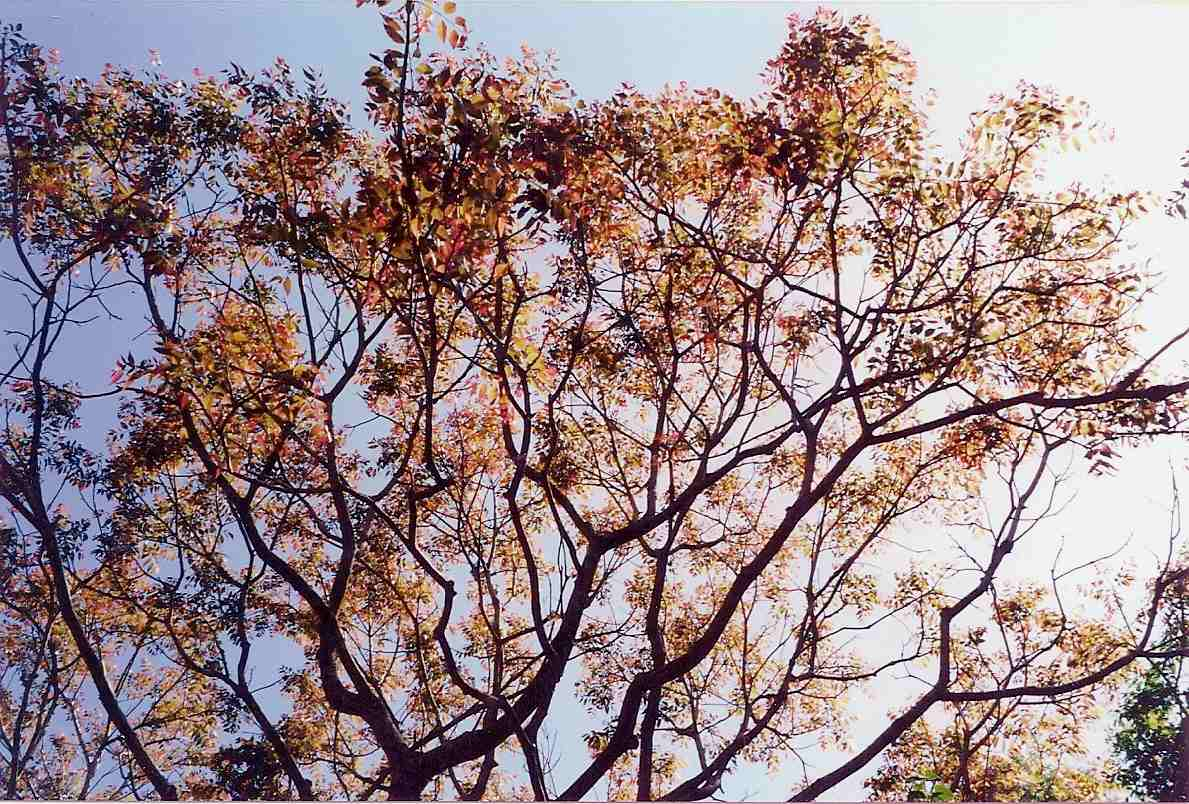
Toona ciliata - red leaves in September, Mount Keira, Illawarra, NSW

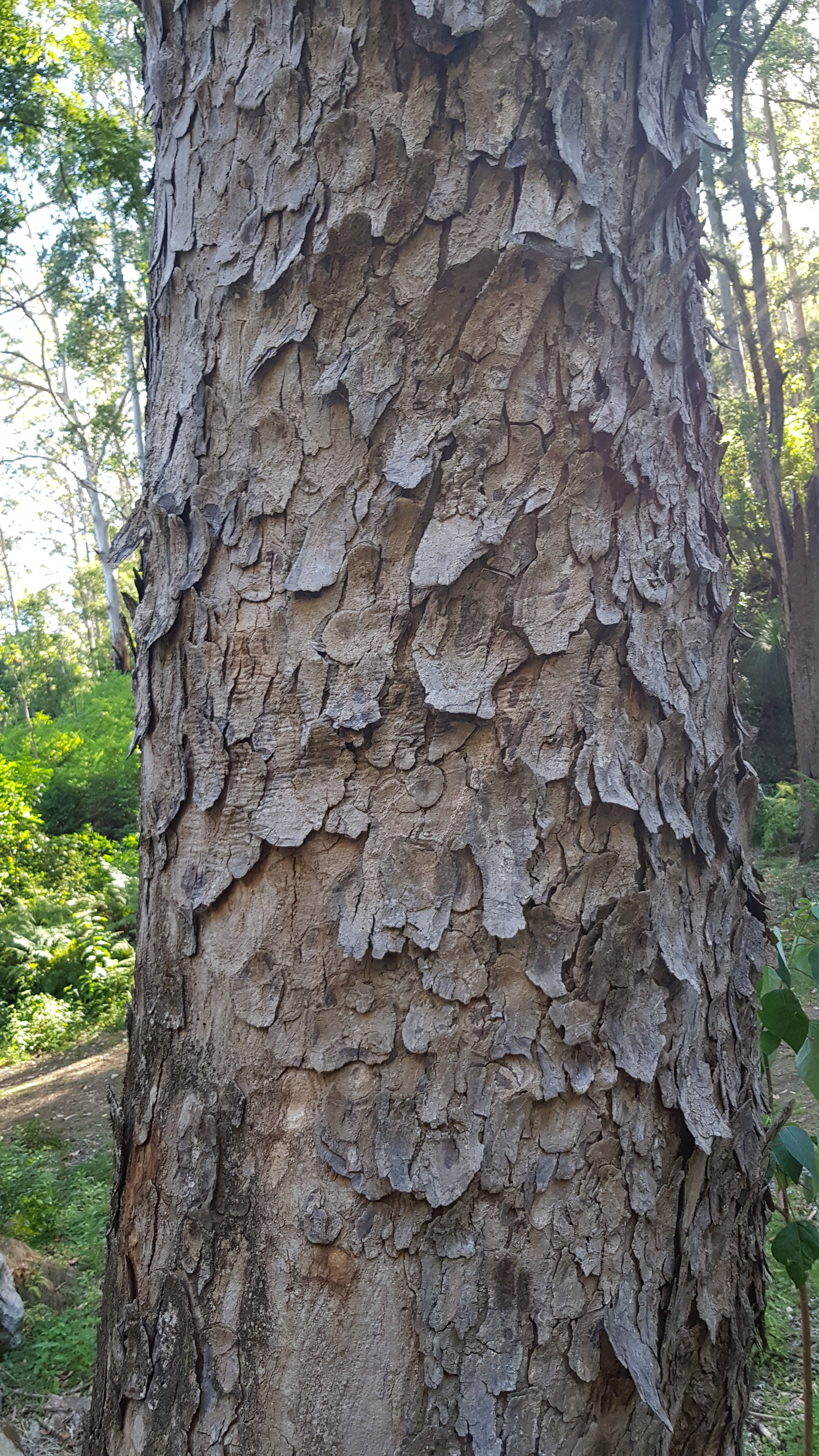
Toona ciliata bark, tree near Macksville, New South Wales, Australia

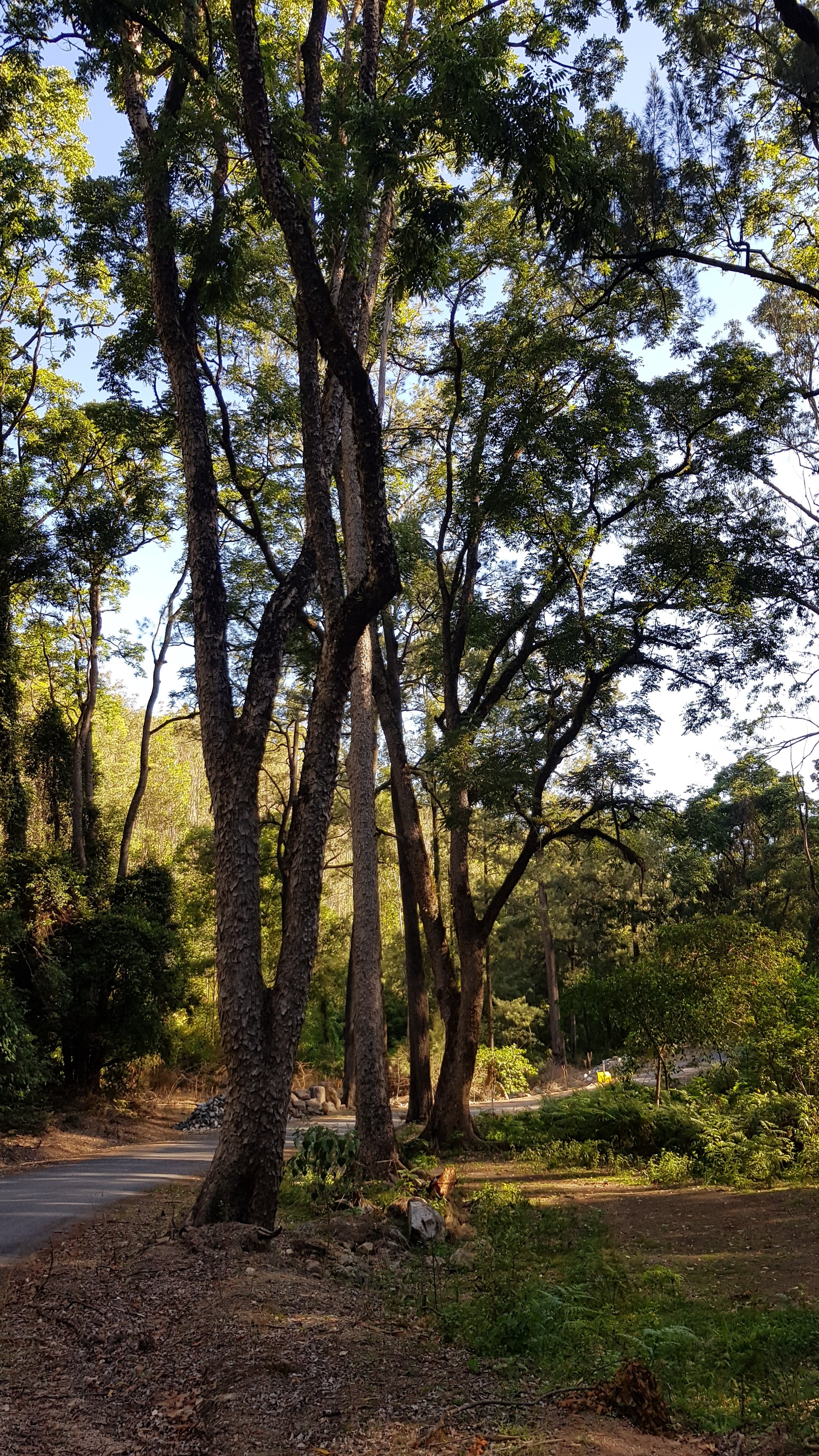
Stand of approximately 10 mature Toona ciliata, south of Drake, New South Wales, a rare sighting in this area

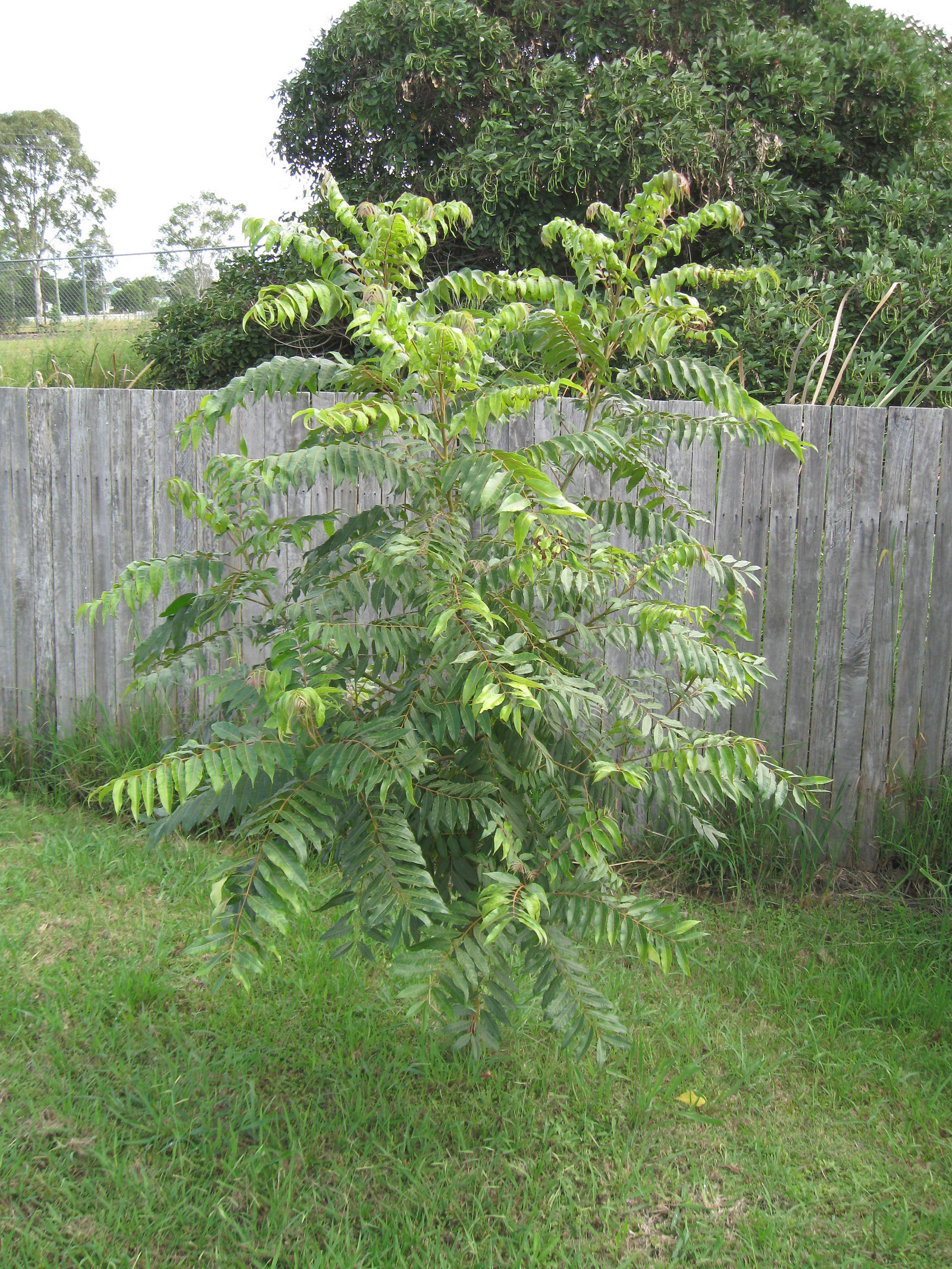
Two-year-old red cedar, growing in a backyard, Casino, Australia

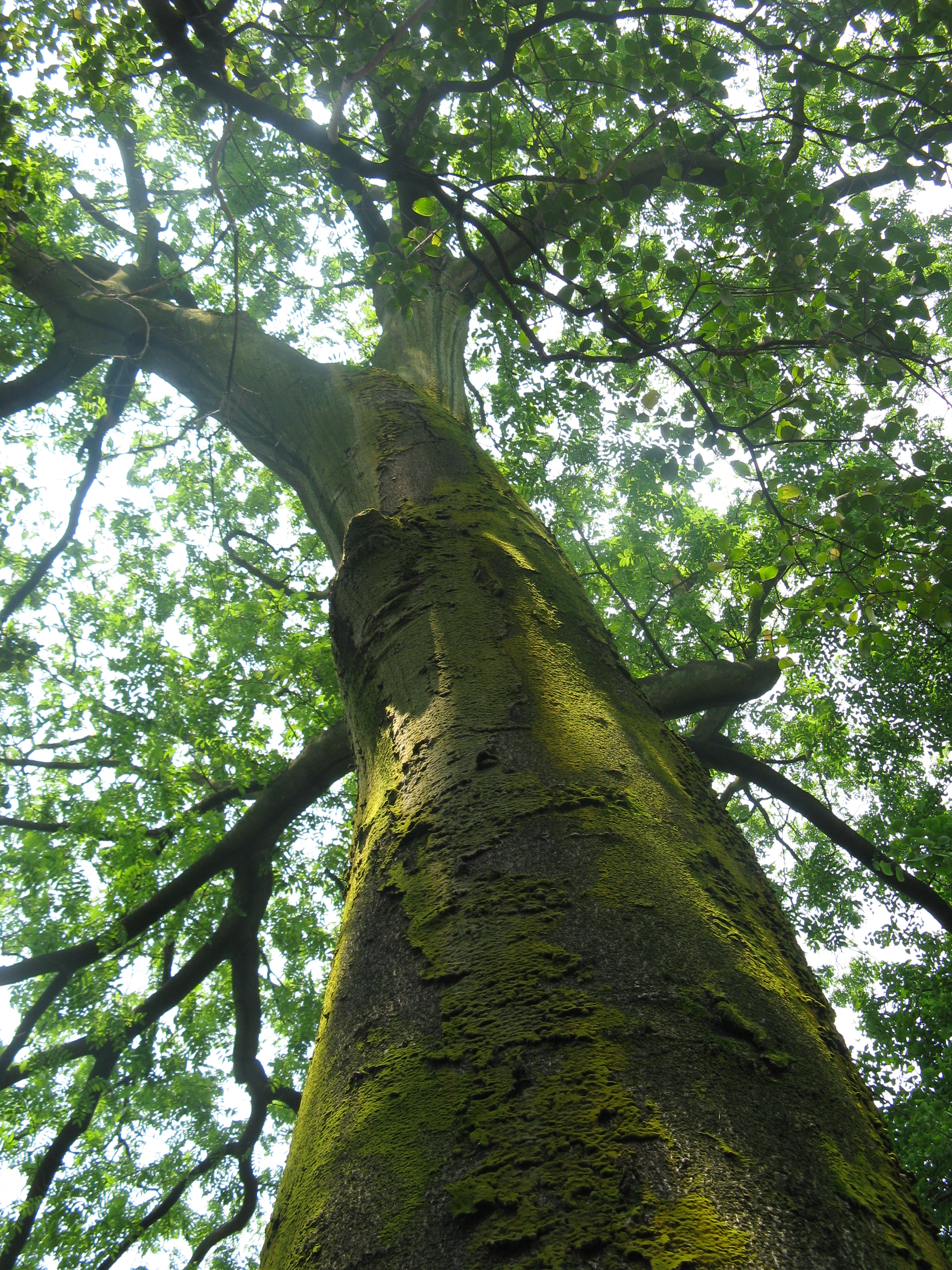
A 60-year-old Toona ciliata var. pubescens in Hunan, China

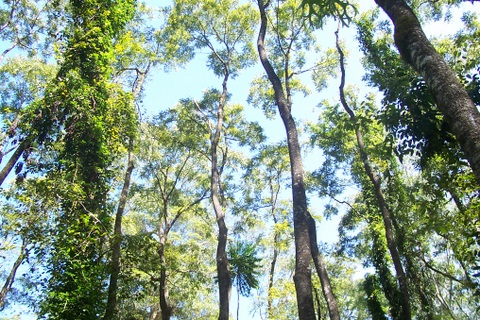
A stand of Toona ciliata near Kempsey, New South Wales

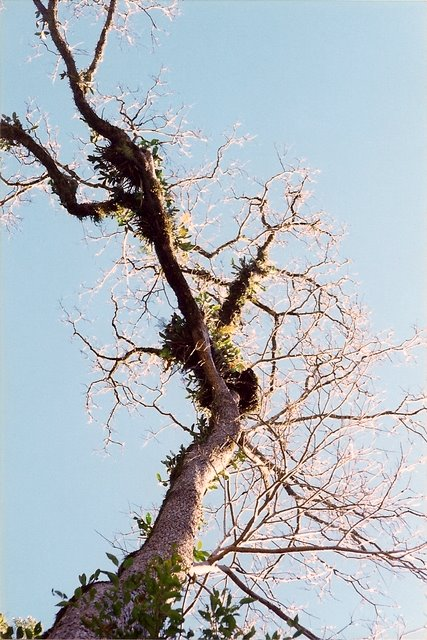
40-metre Toona ciliata, leafless in August, with epiphytic Dendrobium orchids at Barrington Tops, Australia

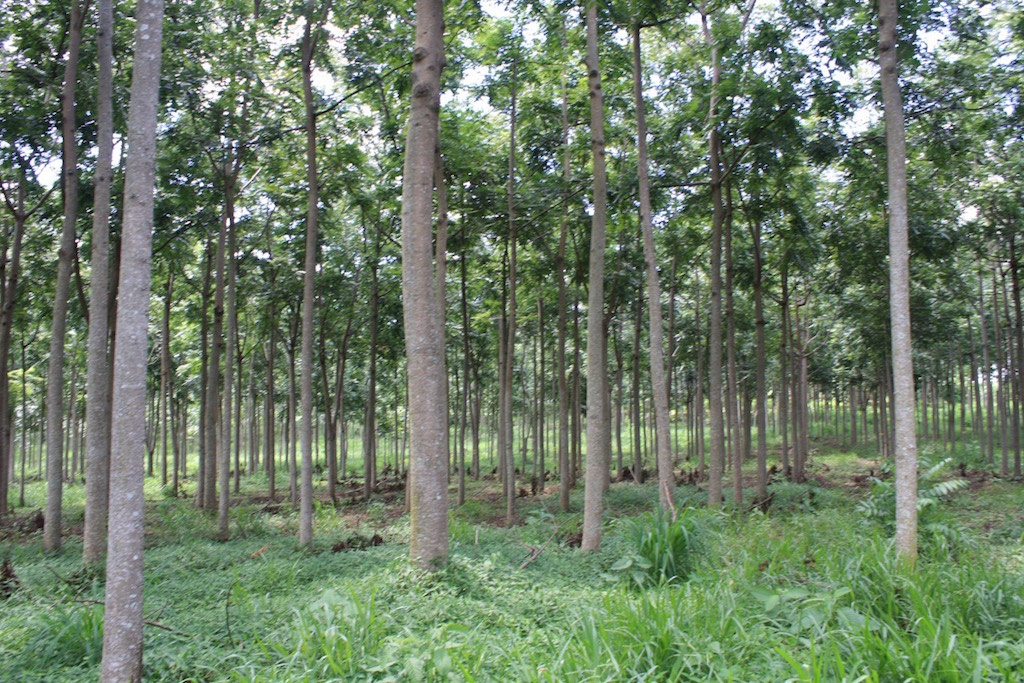
Eight-year-old seedling-planted Toona ciliata, Campo Belo, southeast Brazil

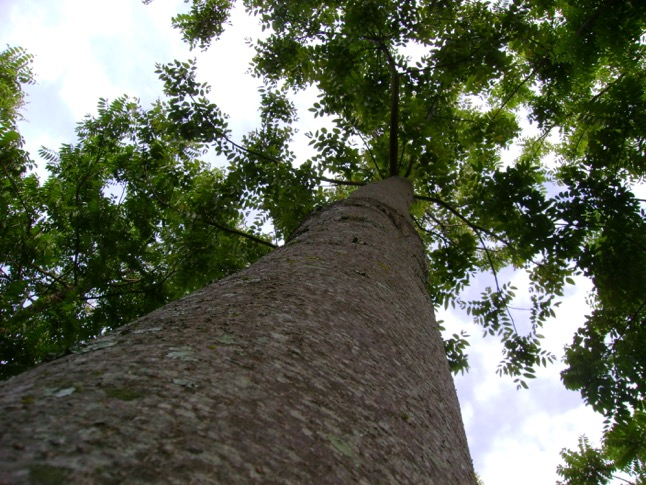
Four-year-old - 17 meter cloned Toona ciliata, Campo Belo, southeast Brazil

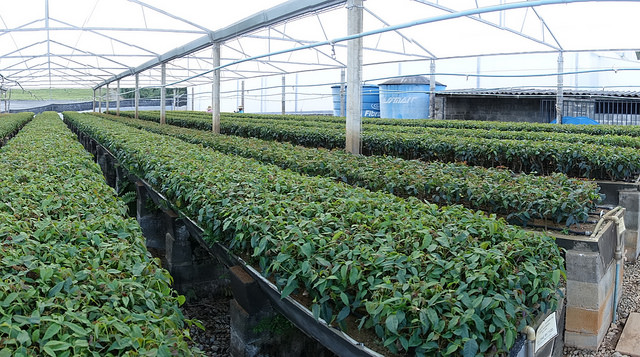
Clones production Toona ciliata, Campo Belo, southeast Brazil

== See also ==
- Cedar wood
- Macleay River
- Toona sureni
