= Simani-ye Sofla =

Simani-ye Sofla سيماني سفلي
- Village
- Location within Iran
- Coordinates: 34°17′18″N 46°28′47″E
- Country: Iran
- Province: Kermanshah
- County: Eslamabad-e Gharb
- Bakhsh: Central
- Rural District: Howmeh-ye Shomali

Population (2006)
  - Total: 73
- Time zone: UTC+3:30 (IRST)
  - Summer (DST): UTC+4:30 (IRDT)

Simani-ye Sofla (Persian: سيماني سفلي, also Romanized as Sīmānī-ye Soflá; also known as Sīmāni, Sīmānī-ye Kūchak, and Sīmānī-ye Pā’īn) is a village in Howmeh-ye Shomali Rural District, in the Central District of Eslamabad-e Gharb County, Kermanshah Province, Iran. At the 2006 census, its population was 73, in 17 families.
