= Toona fargesii =

Scientific classification
- Kingdom: Plantae
- Clade: Tracheophytes
- Clade: Angiosperms
- Clade: Eudicots
- Clade: Rosids
- Order: Sapindales
- Family: Meliaceae
- Genus: Toona
- Species: T. fargesii

Binomial name
- Toona fargesii A.Chev.

Synonyms
- Cedrela febrifuga var. assamensis C.DC. Cedrela febrifuga var. verrucosa C.DC. Cedrela microcarpa Rehder & E.H.Wilson; Cedrela rehderiana H.L.Li; Toona microcarpa var. sahnii Bahadur; Toona rubriflora C.J.Tseng

Species of tree

Toona fargesii, or the Chinese common name hong hua xiang chun is a medium-sized deciduous tree native to southern China that grows to a height of 25 to 30 m (82 to 98 ft) tall.
