= Choqazard-e Chupankareh =

Village in Kermanshah province, Iran

Choqazard-e Chupankareh Persian: چقازرد چوپانكاره
- Village
- Location within Iran
- Coordinates: 34°10′22″N 46°27′13″E
- Country: Iran
- Province: Kermanshah
- County: Eslamabad-e Gharb
- District: Central
- Rural District: Howmeh-ye Shomali

Population (2016)
  - Total: 844
- Time zone: UTC+3:30 (IRST)

Choqazard-e Chupankareh (Persian: چقازرد چوپانكاره) (Note: Also romanized as Choqāzard-e Chūpānkareh; also known as Choqāzard) is a village in Howmeh-ye Shomali Rural District of the Central District of Eslamabad-e Gharb County, Kermanshah province, Iran.

== Demographics ==
=== Population ===
At the time of the 2006 National Census, the village's population was 882 in 188 households. The following census in 2011 counted 929 people in 223 households. The 2016 census measured the population of the village as 844 people in 234 households. It was the most populous village in its rural district.
