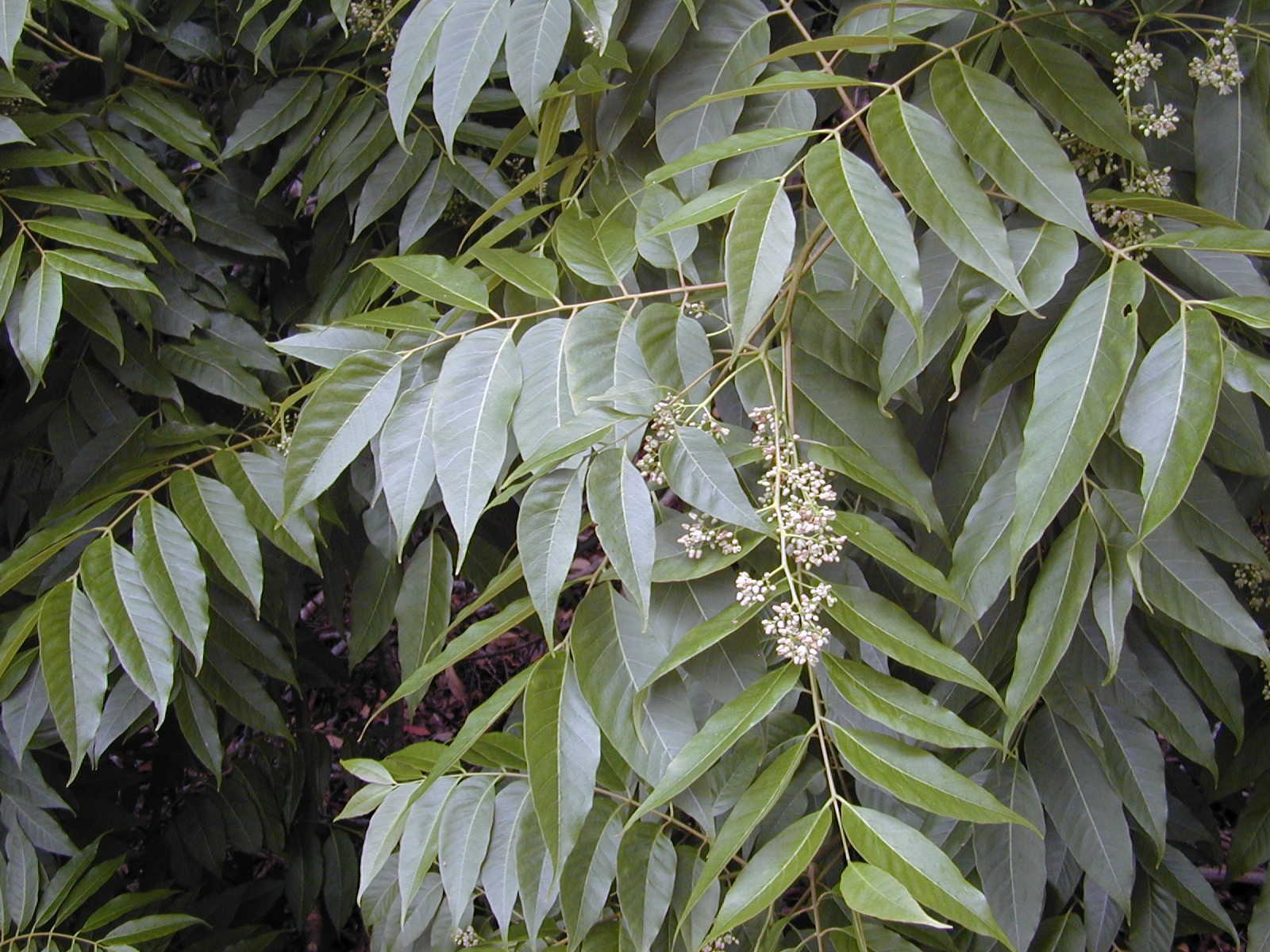
- Toona ciliata (Type species)

Scientific classification
- Kingdom: Plantae
- Clade: Tracheophytes
- Clade: Angiosperms
- Clade: Eudicots
- Clade: Rosids
- Order: Sapindales
- Family: Meliaceae
- Subfamily: Cedreloideae
- Genus: Toona (Endl.) M.Roem.

Species
- See text

Synonyms
- Fabrenia Noronha; Surenus Rumph. ex Kuntze

= Toona =

Genus of plants

Toona, commonly known as red cedar, toon (also spelled tun) or toona, tooni (in Nepal and India) is a genus in the mahogany family, Meliaceae, native from Afghanistan south to India, and east to North Korea, Papua New Guinea and eastern Australia. In older texts, the genus was often incorporated within a wider circumscription of the related genus Cedrela, but that genus is now restricted to species from the Americas.

== Uses ==
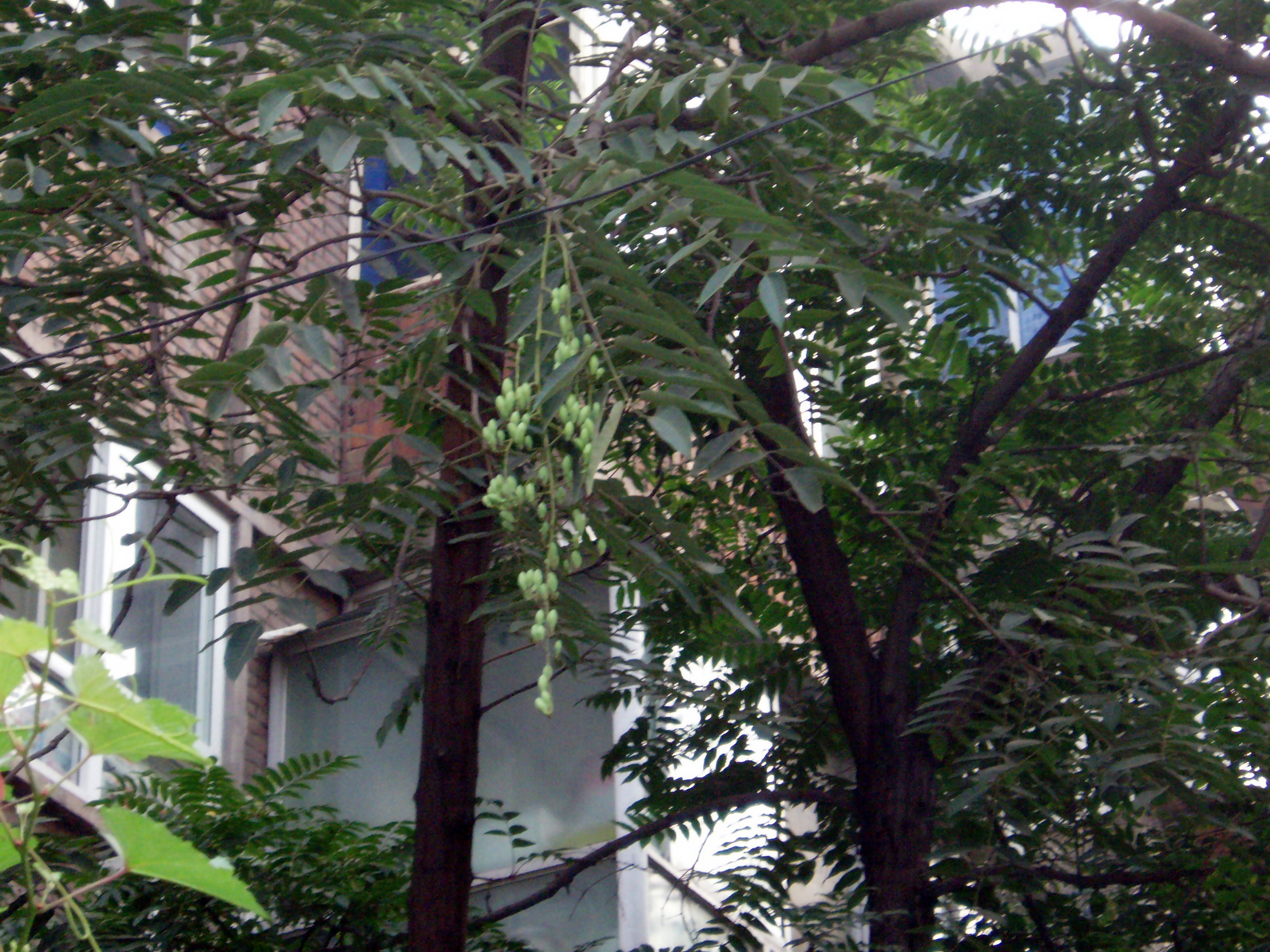
Chinese Toon tree (Toona sinensis)

=== Ornamental use ===
Toona sinensis is of interest as by far the most cold-tolerant species in the Meliaceae, native in China as far north as 40°N in the Beijing area, where its tender shoots, called xiangchun (Chinese: 香椿; pinyin: xiāngchūn), are a traditional local leaf vegetable. It is the only member of the family that can be cultivated successfully in northern Europe, where it is sometimes planted as an ornamental tree in parks and avenues. Until recently, it had no widespread English common name, though Chinese Mahogany (reflecting its botanical relationship) is now used (e.g. Rushforth 1999).

=== Wood source ===
Toona ciliata is an important timber tree. It provides a valuable hardwood used for furniture, ornamental panelling, shipbuilding, and musical instruments like the sitar, rudra veena, and drums. Due to the restrictions in recent years on the use of natively-grown American mahogany, it has become one of the common mahogany replacements in electric guitar manufacturing.

=== Medicinal and culinary uses ===
Toona sinensis is used in Chinese traditional medicine and eaten as a vegetable or sauce in China (leaves and shoots).

== Species ==
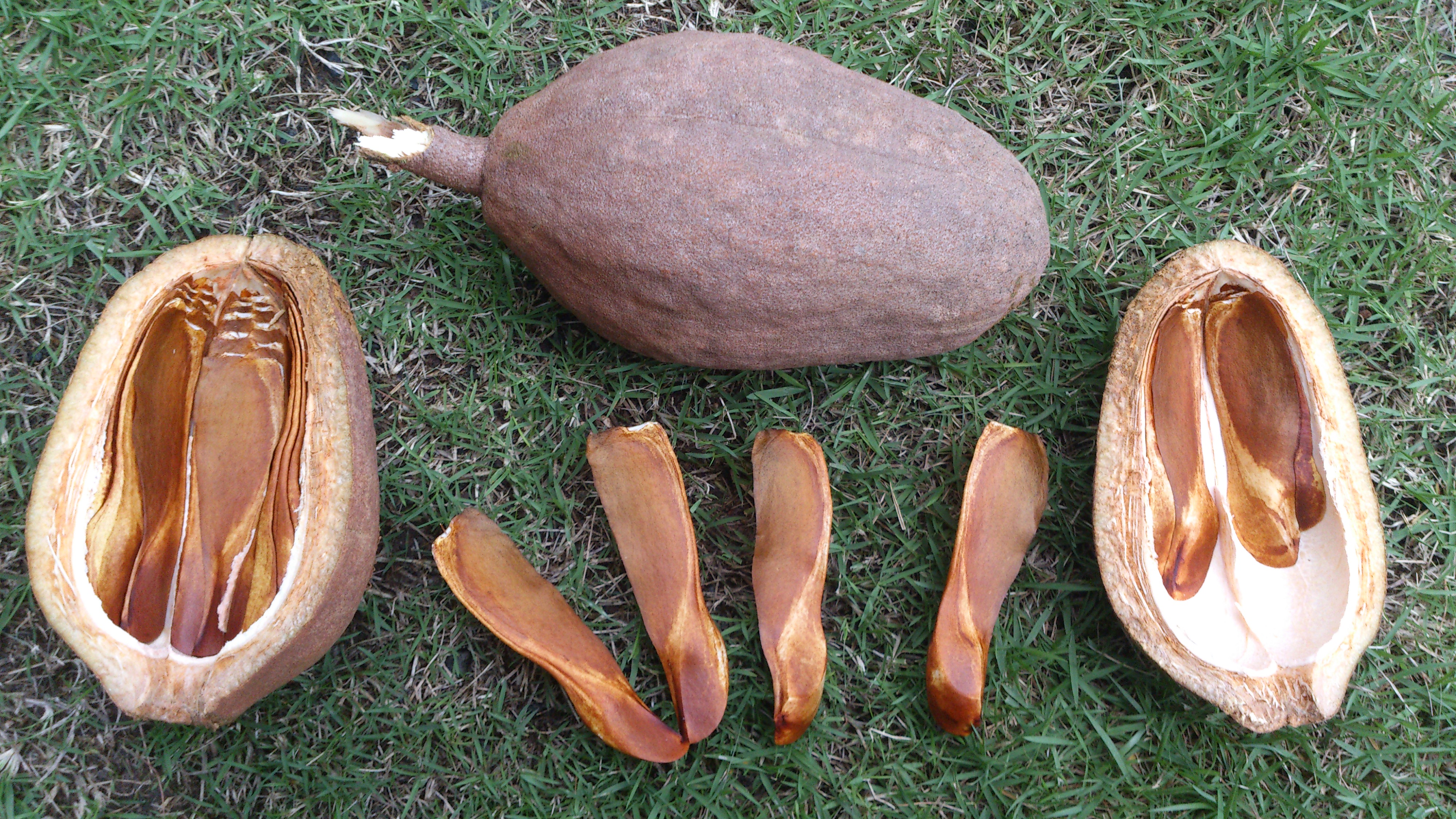
Philippine mahogany (Toona calantas) fruit and seeds

As of 11 April 2024, six species are recognised by Plants of the World Online, as follows:

- Toona calantas Merr. & Rolfe - Malesia, New Guinea, Bismarck Archipelago.
- Toona calcicola Rueangr., Tagane & Suddee - Thailand.
- Toona ciliata M.Roem. - Pakistan to southern China, SE Asia and Australia.
- Toona fargesii A.Chev. - Eastern Himalayas to southern China.
- Toona sinensis (A.Juss.) M.Roem. - Pakistan to China and Malesia.
- Toona sureni (Blume) Merr. - Southern China, Malesia and Papuasia.
