= Chongor-e Jalilvand =

Chongor-e Jalilvand چنگرجليلوند
- Village
- Location within Iran
- Coordinates: 34°12′45″N 46°28′52″E
- Country: Iran
- Province: Kermanshah
- County: Eslamabad-e Gharb
- Bakhsh: Central
- Rural District: Howmeh-ye Shomali

Population (2006)
  - Total: 823
- Time zone: UTC+3:30 (IRST)
  - Summer (DST): UTC+4:30 (IRDT)

Chongor-e Jalilvand (Persian: چنگرجليلوند, also Romanized as Chongor-e Jalīlvand; also known as Changar, Changezeh, Chengoreh, Chongoreh-ye Jalīlvand, Chongoreh-ye Sīmīvand, Chownger, and Chowngor) is a village in Howmeh-ye Shomali Rural District, in the Central District of Eslamabad-e Gharb County, Kermanshah Province, Iran. At the 2006 census, its population was 823, in 164 families.
