= Suran-e Sofla =

Suran-e Sofla سوران سفلي
- Village
- Location within Iran
- Coordinates: 34°12′55″N 46°34′24″E
- Country: Iran
- Province: Kermanshah
- County: Eslamabad-e Gharb
- Bakhsh: Central
- Rural District: Howmeh-ye Shomali

Population (2006)
  - Total: 133
- Time zone: UTC+3:30 (IRST)
  - Summer (DST): UTC+4:30 (IRDT)

Suran-e Sofla (Persian: سوران سفلي, also Romanized as Sūrān-e Soflá; also known as Shīd‘alī, Sūrān, and Sūrān-e Pā’īn) is a village in Howmeh-ye Shomali Rural District, in the Central District of Eslamabad-e Gharb County, Kermanshah Province, Iran. At the 2006 census, its population was 133, in 29 families.
