= Simani-ye Olya =

Simani-ye Olya سيماني عليا
- Village
- Location within Iran
- Coordinates: 34°16′23″N 46°28′47″E
- Country: Iran
- Province: Kermanshah
- County: Eslamabad-e Gharb
- Bakhsh: Central
- Rural District: Howmeh-ye Shomali

Population (2006)
  - Total: 67
- Time zone: UTC+3:30 (IRST)
  - Summer (DST): UTC+4:30 (IRDT)

Simani-ye Olya (Persian: سيماني عليا, also Romanized as Sīmānī-ye ‘Olyā; also known as Sīmān-e Bālā, Sīmānī, Sīmānī-ye Bālā, and Sīmānī-ye Bozorg) is a village in Howmeh-ye Shomali Rural District, in the Central District of Eslamabad-e Gharb County, Kermanshah Province, Iran. At the 2006 census, its population was 67, in 13 families.
