= Barzeh, Kermanshah =

Village in Kermanshah province, Iran

Barzeh Persian: برزه
- Village
- Location within Iran
- Coordinates: 34°15′49″N 46°31′49″E
- Country: Iran
- Province: Kermanshah
- County: Eslamabad-e Gharb
- District: Central
- Rural District: Howmeh-ye Shomali

Population (2016)
  - Total: 252
- Time zone: UTC+3:30 (IRST)

Barzeh (Persian: برزه) is a village in, and the capital of, Howmeh-ye Shomali Rural District of the Central District of Eslamabad-e Gharb County, Kermanshah province, Iran.

== Demographics ==
=== Population ===
At the time of the 2006 National Census, the village's population was 303 in 63 households. The following census in 2011 counted 265 people in 59 households. The 2016 census measured the population of the village as 252 people in 66 households.
