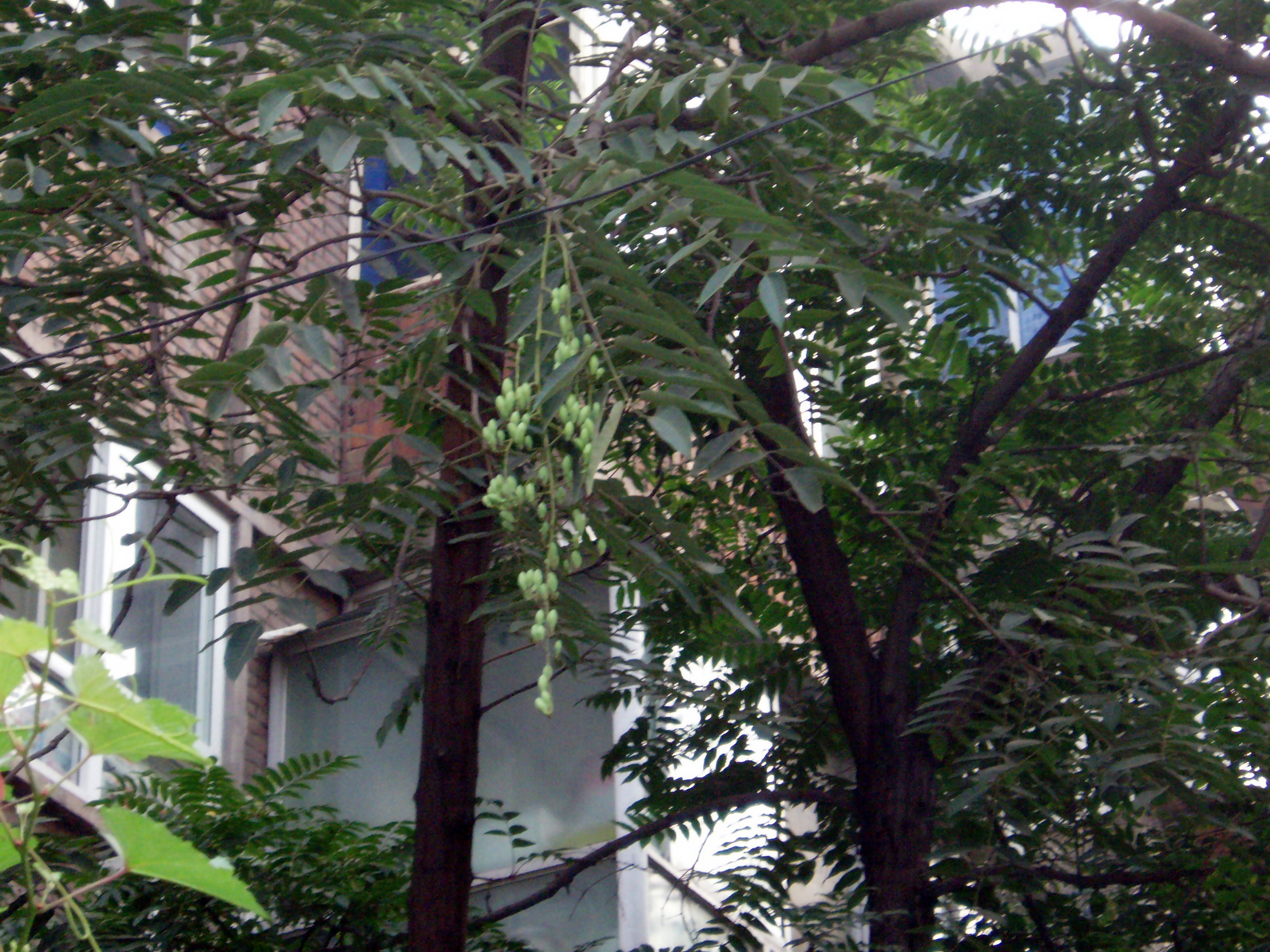
- Foliage and seed capsules

Scientific classification
- Kingdom: Plantae
- Clade: Tracheophytes
- Clade: Angiosperms
- Clade: Eudicots
- Clade: Rosids
- Order: Sapindales
- Family: Meliaceae
- Genus: Toona
- Species: T. sinensis

Binomial name
- Toona sinensis (A.Juss.) M.Roem.

Synonyms
- Synonyms list: Ailanthus flavescens Carrière; Ailanthus mairei Gagnep.; Cedrela longiflora var. kumaona C. DC.; Cedrela serrata var. puberula C. DC.; Cedrela sinensis Juss.; Cedrela sinensis var. lanceolata H.L. Li; Cedrela sinensis var. schensiana C. DC.; Mioptrila odorata Raf.; Surenus glabra (C. DC.) Kuntze; Surenus serrata (Royle) Kuntze; Surenus serrulata (Miq.) Kuntze; Surenus sinensis (Juss.) Kuntze; Toona glabra (C. DC.) Harms; Toona microcarpa var. denticulata A. Chev.; Toona microcarpa var. grandifolia A. Chev.; Toona serrata (Royle) M. Roem.; Toona serrulata (Miq.) Harms; Toona sinensis var. hupehana (C. DC.) A. Chev.; Toona sinensis var. incarvillei A. Chev.; Toona sinensis var. schensiana (C. DC.) H. Li ex X.M. Chen

= Toona sinensis =

Species of tree

Toona sinensis, commonly called Chinese mahogany, Chinese cedar, Chinese toon, beef and onion plant, or red toon (Chinese: 香椿; pinyin: xiāngchūn; Korean: 참죽, romanized: chamjuk; Hindi: डारलू, romanized: ḍāralū; Malay: suren; Vietnamese: hương xuân) is a species of Toona native to eastern and southeastern Asia, ranging from northern Korean peninsula through most of eastern, central, and southwestern China, in Nepal, northeastern India, Burma (Myanmar), Thailand, and even present in Malaysia and western Indonesia.

== Characteristics ==
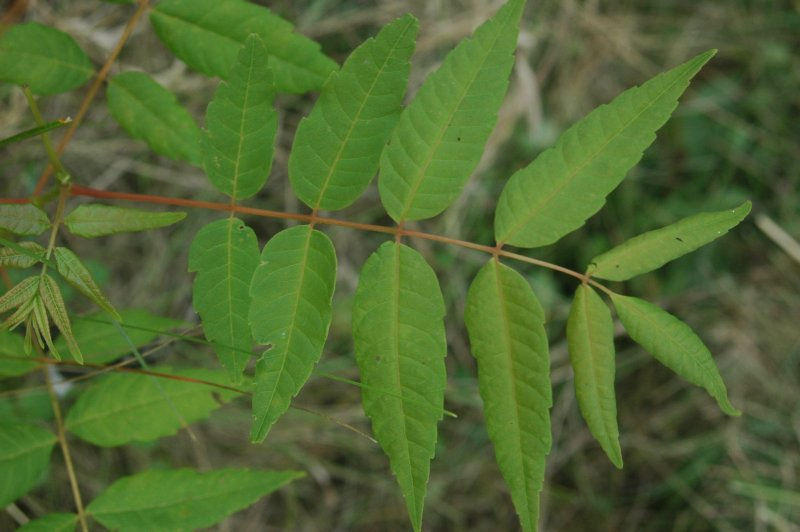
Leaf (unusual specimen with terminal leaflet)

It is a deciduous tree growing to 25 metres (82 ft) tall with a trunk up to 70 cm diameter. The bark is brown, smooth on young trees, becoming scaly to shaggy on old trees. The leaves are pinnate, 50–70 cm long and 30–40 cm broad, with 10–40 leaflets, the terminal leaflet usually absent (paripinnate) but sometimes present (imparipennate); the individual leaflets 9–15 cm long and 2.5–4 cm broad, with an entire or weakly serrated margin. The young leaves are reddish-brown or purple, and have a smell. The flowers are produced in summer in panicles 30–50 cm long at the end of a branch; each flower is small, 4–5 mm diameter, with five white or pale pink petals. The fruit is a golden capsule 2–3.5 cm long, containing several winged seeds.

It is similar to Ailanthus altissima in appearance, but their leaves smell differently. Toona has rough bark, while A. altissima has smooth bark.

== Cultivation ==
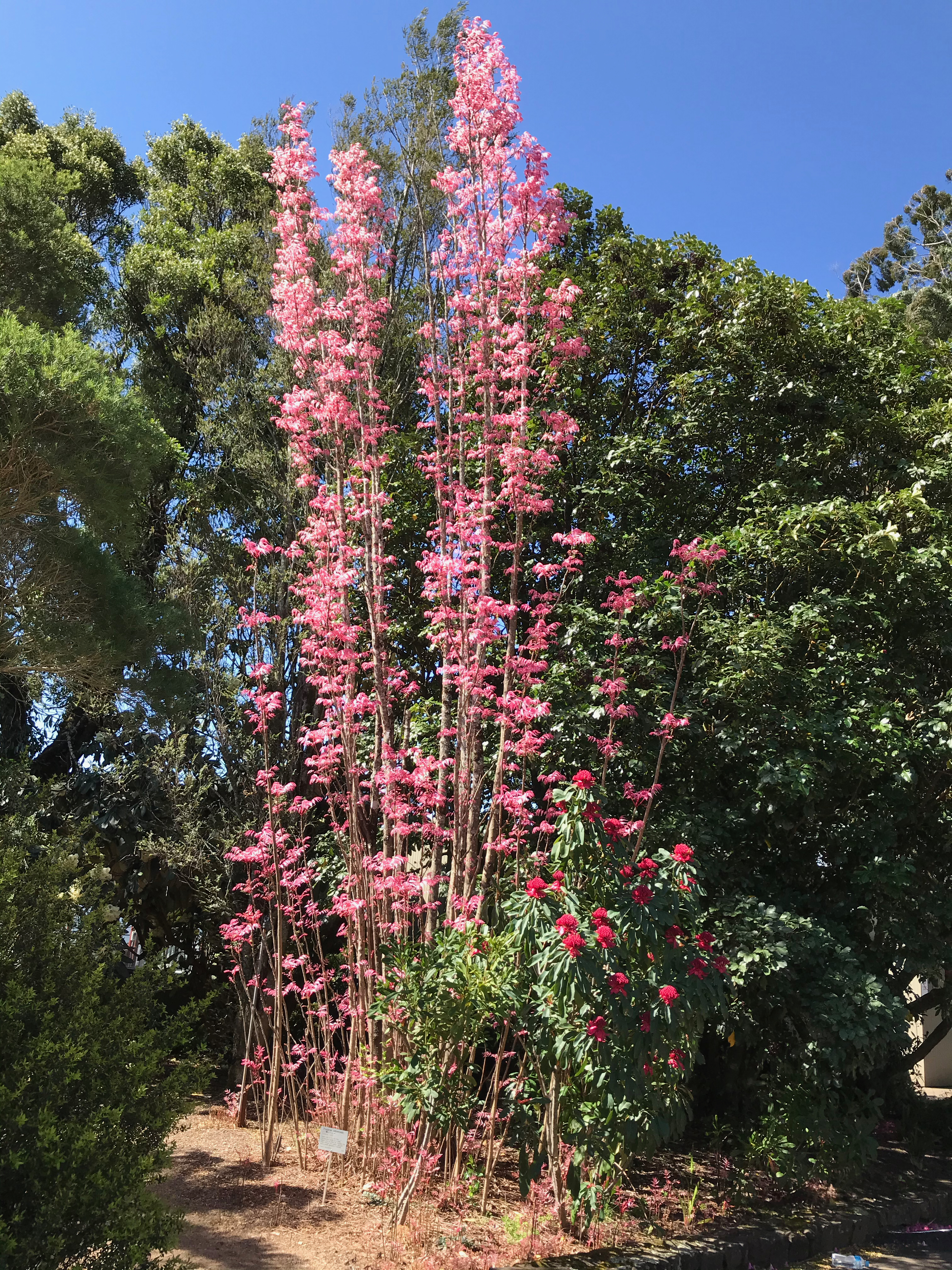
Ornamental cultivar 'Flamingo'

Toona sinensis can reproduce both sexually and asexually, including seed propagation, cutting propagation and tissue culture.

Seed propagation can provide large quantity of seedlings, which is suitable for the need of mass cultivation. Seeds soaked in warm water for a moderate amount of time before sowing are more likely to germinate. Normally, seeds of T. sinensis are sowed between the late March and early April in East Asia, and the time may vary depending on the actual planting area. Saplings grown from seeds in spring can be transplanted with leaves in fall.

Cutting propagation uses a piece of stem or root of mature plant to grow a new plant in media like moist soil. This method has a higher survival rate in saplings than other methods. Usually semi-lignified stems are used in planting because those that have undergone full lignification process are hard to take root or root slowly and stems that have not lignified are easy to decay after planting. NAA or Vitamin D solutions can help with the rooting of cut stems. Normally, T. sinensis stems are cut from mature plant and cultivated between late June and early July in East Asia, and time may differ depending on the actual planting area.

Tissue culture of T. sinensis started from the late 1980s in China. Successful cases include the culture of T. sinensis seedlings on MS medium together with IAA and BA hormones. Since the 1980s, researchers have collected stems of mature T. sinensis trees from different regions and built a set of methods specifically for the tissue culture of rare varieties of Toona sinensis.

== Uses ==
=== Food and Nutrition ===
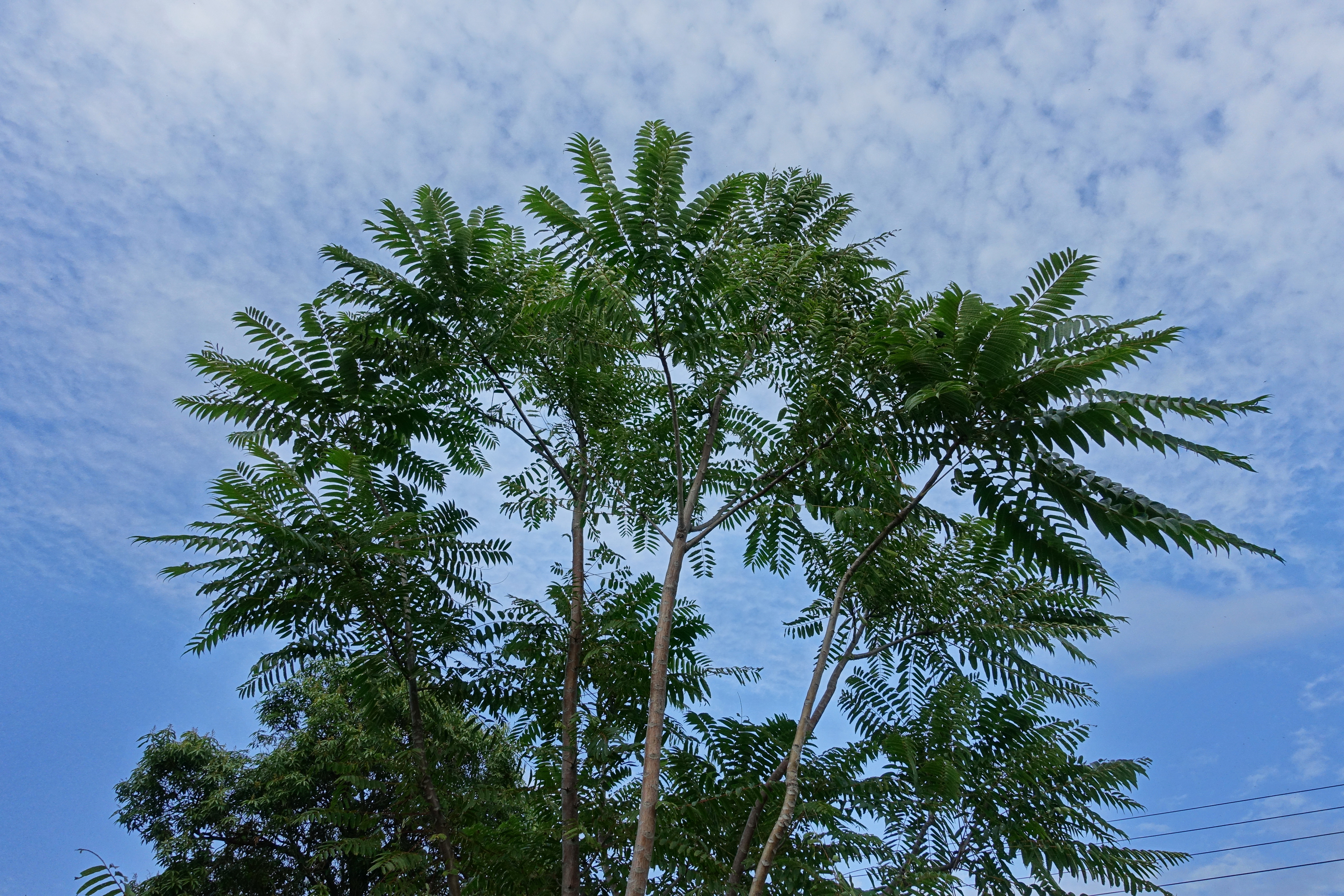
A Toona sinensis tree

The young leaves of T. sinensis are extensively used as a vegetable in Chinese cuisine; they have a floral, yet onion-like flavor, attributed to volatile organosulfur compounds. Plants with red young leaves are considered of better flavour than those where the young leaves are green.

In China and Southeast Asian countries such as Malaysia, the young leaves of Toona sinensis or commonly known as Chinese Mahogany is used to make Toona paste, which is used as a condiment to serve with plain rice porridge as breakfast and simple meals, or to enhance the flavour of a dish or soup. Common dishes made with Toona paste are Chinese Mahogany fried rice, Chinese Mahogany beancurd, and Chinese Mahogany mushroom soup.

The leaves contain Vitamin E, and high amounts of iron, calcium and chlorophyll.

=== Lumber and landscape use ===
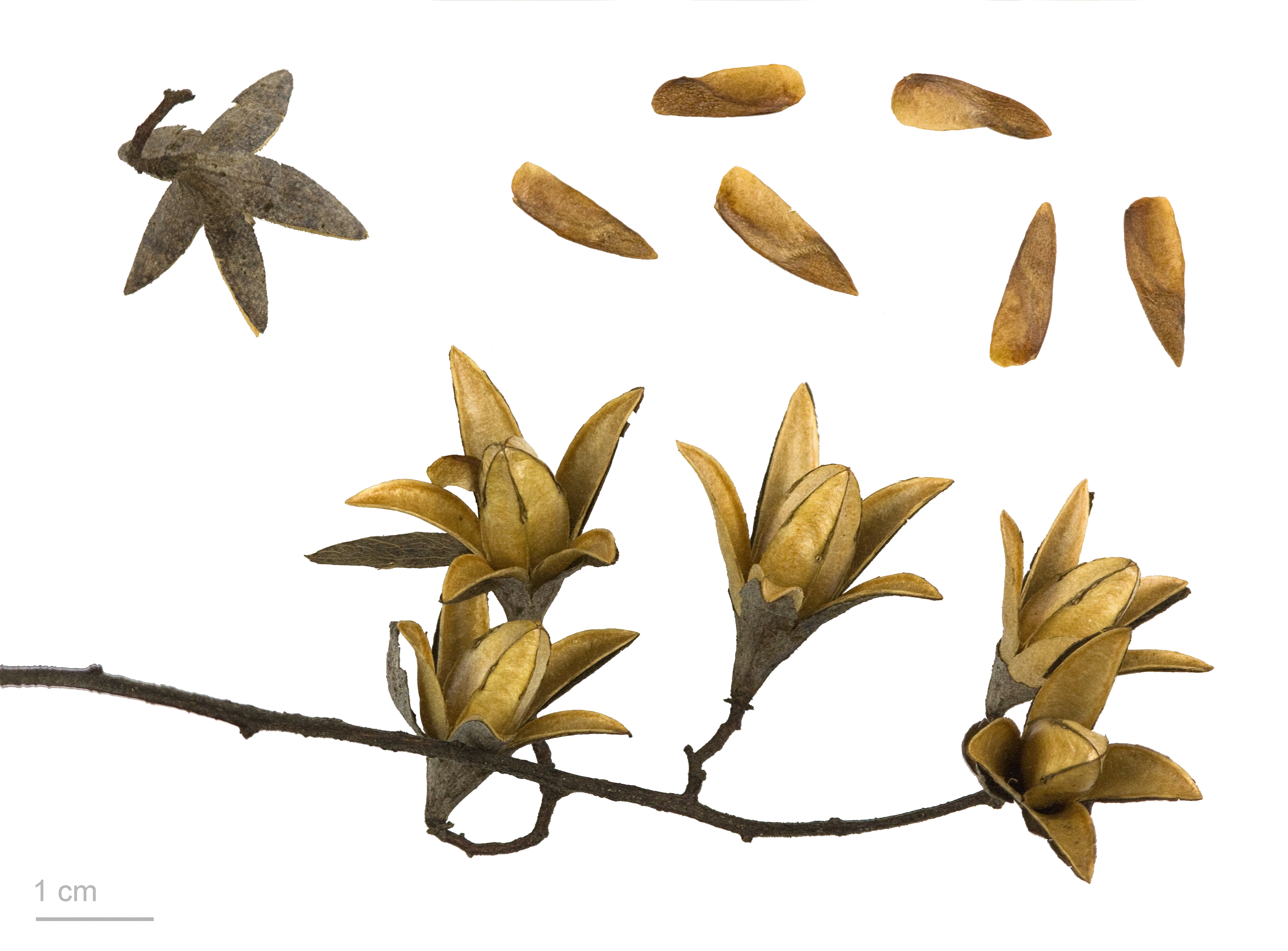
Toona sinensis - MHNT

The timber is hard and reddish; it is valuable, used for furniture, musical instruments such as guitars, and in woodcarving. This is a common (and substantially cheaper) replacement for Swietenia or "true mahogany", which is now commercially restricted from being sourced natively.

Outside Asia, T. sinensis is valued more as a large ornamental tree for its haggard aspect. It is by far the most cold-tolerant species in the Meliaceae and the only member of the family that can be cultivated successfully in northern Europe.

=== Medicine ===
According to Traditional Chinese Medicine (TCM), the leaves of T. sinensis are beneficial for digestion and cough problems, and can help to stop bleeding.

Recent researches find out that polysaccharides contained in T. sinensis leaves can protect liver cells in high-fat or high-carbohydrate diets. Quercetin extracted from leaves is found a natural antioxidant, and can act as a cancer preventive.

== Chemical constituents ==
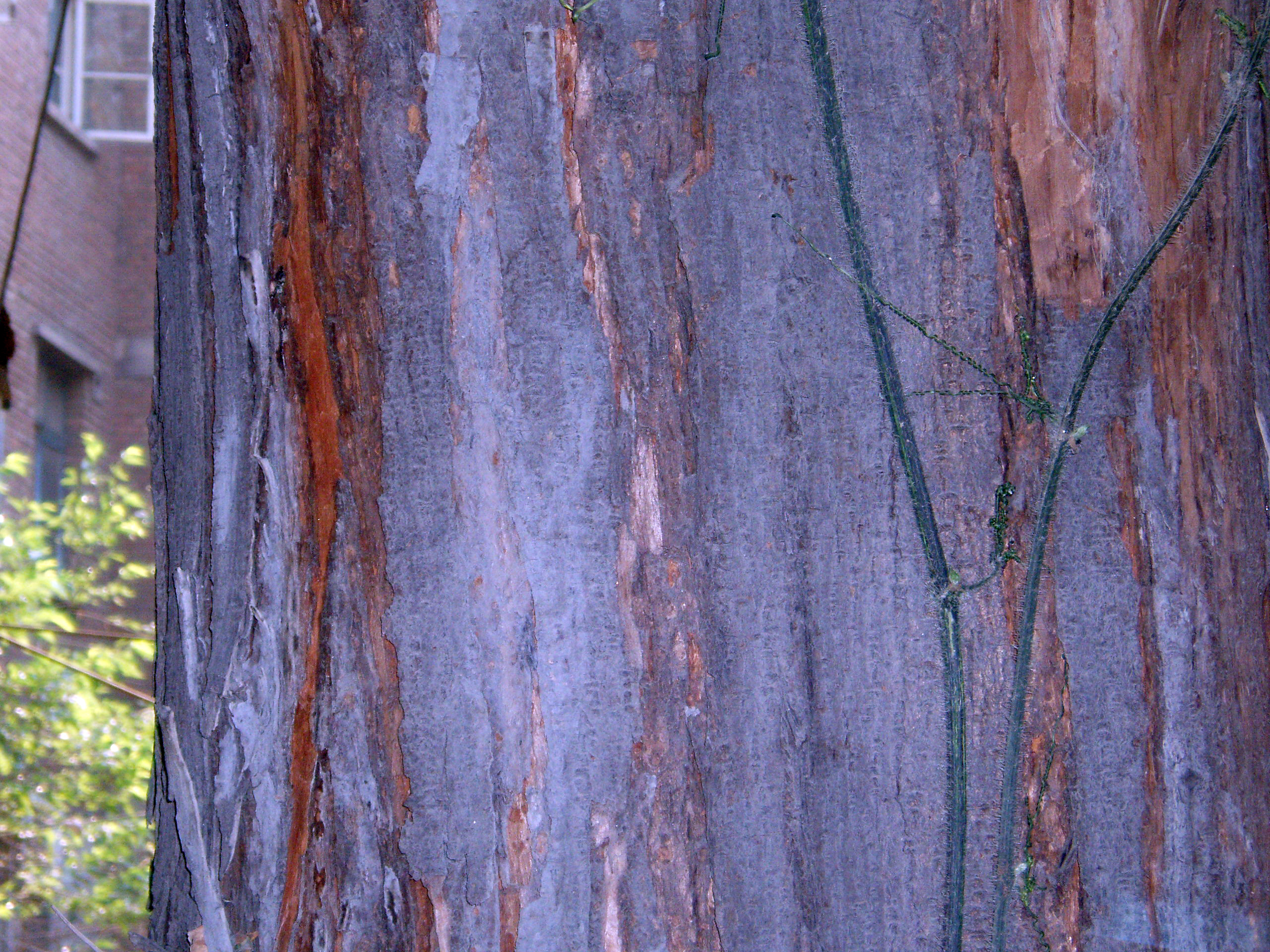
The bark of Chinese Toon tree

The leaves of T. sinensis has a relative high content of nitrite, which is about 157 to 160 mg/kg. However, after boiling with water, the amount of nitrite left is only about 7 mg/kg, which is safe to eat. Because the content of nitrite will increase as time passes, T. sinensis leaves are not suitable for long time storage.

The quercetin contained in T. sinensis leaves can induce cell cycle arrest and lead to apoptosis of cells.

== Culture ==
In Chinese literature, Toona sinensis is often used symbolically, with a mature tree representing a father. This manifests itself occasionally when expressing best wishes to a friend's father and mother in a letter, where one can write "wishing your Toona sinensis and daylily are strong and happy" (simplified Chinese: 椿萱并茂; traditional Chinese: 椿萱並茂; pinyin: chūnxuānbìngmào), with Toona sinensis metaphorically referring to the father and daylily to the mother.
