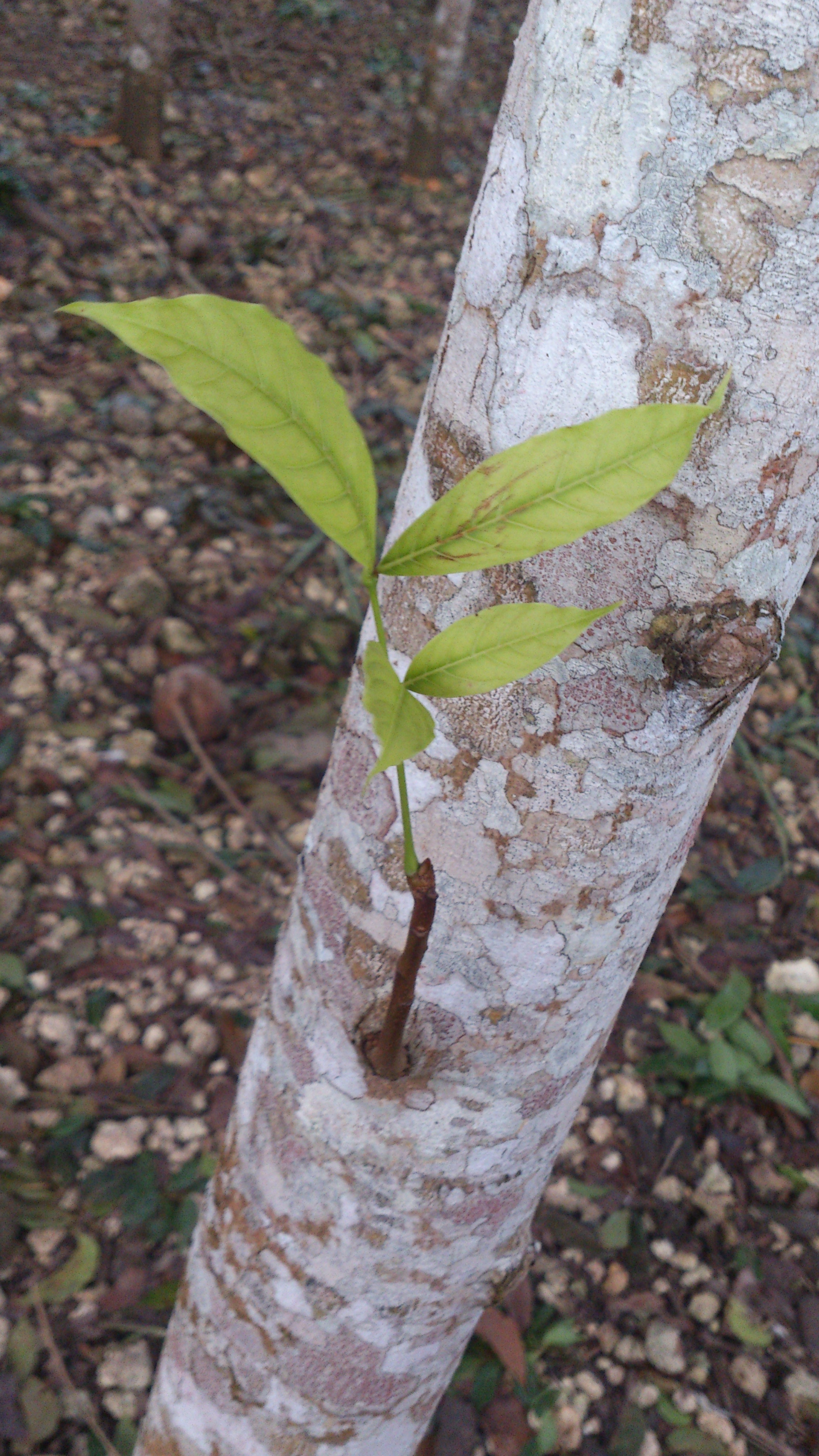
- Toona calantas leaf and bark

Conservation status
- Data Deficient (IUCN 3.1)

Scientific classification
- Kingdom: Plantae
- Clade: Tracheophytes
- Clade: Angiosperms
- Clade: Eudicots
- Clade: Rosids
- Order: Sapindales
- Family: Meliaceae
- Genus: Toona
- Species: T. calantas

Binomial name
- Toona calantas Merr. & Rolfe

= Toona calantas =

Species of tree

Toona calantas is a species of tree in the mahogany family. It is found in Indonesia, the Philippines, and Thailand. It is threatened by habitat loss. It is commonly known as kalantas (also spelled calantas), lanipga (in Visayan and Bikol), ample (in Batanes), bantinan (in Cagayan and Mountain Province), danupra (in Zambales and Ilocos Norte), Philippine cedar, or Philippine mahogany (although the latter is also applied to members of the unrelated genus Shorea).

== Description and phenology ==
The kalantas tree can grow up to 25 metres (82 ft) and can measure up to 25 centimetres (9.8 in) in diameter. The color of the bark ranges from yellowish to dark brown and the inner bark is light brown while trunk is straight and terete. The leaves can be described as compound, alternate oblong or broadly lanceolate. The fruit of the kalantas tree is a capsule that can be ellipsoid or oblongoid that measures 3–4 centimetres (1.2–1.6 in) long.

Flowering occurs from June to August while fruiting occurs from September to November. In Mount Makiling, Laguna, Philippines, seed gathering takes place from February to March.

== Distribution, importance and conservation status ==
Generally scattered all over the Philippines particularly in the Balabac group of islands, the kalantas tree can be found in the hills of a forest situated in low to medium altitudes. The wood of the tree is used for making boxes, furniture or plywood. Kalantas has been categorized by the International Union for Conservation of Nature (IUCN) as Data Deficient but it was reported that kalantas is exhausted due to logging and kaingin (a Tagalog term for slash-and-burn). Reforestation efforts have been done in the Philippines and the kalantas tree is included in these efforts. One of the efforts were done by the Philippine Department of Environment and Natural Resources during the term of then President Gloria Macapagal-Arroyo where the president herself planted a seedling of a kalantas tree, which is the favored tree promoted by the president.
