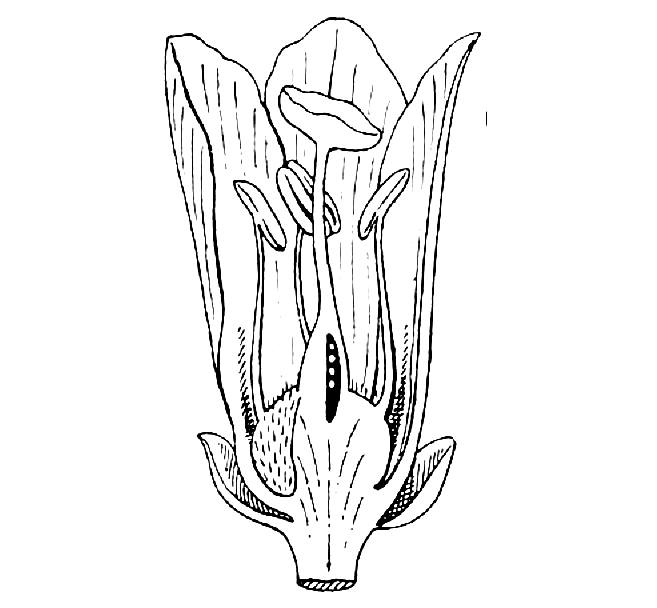
- 1907 illustration of a Toona sureni flower

Conservation status
- Least Concern (IUCN 3.1)

Scientific classification
- Kingdom: Plantae
- Clade: Tracheophytes
- Clade: Angiosperms
- Clade: Eudicots
- Clade: Rosids
- Order: Sapindales
- Family: Meliaceae
- Genus: Toona
- Species: T. sureni

Binomial name
- Toona sureni (Blume) Merr.

Synonyms
- Cedrela febrifuga Blume; Cedrela sureni (Blume) Burkill; Swietenia sureni Blume; Toona febrifuga (Blume) M.J. Roemer

= Toona sureni =

Species of tree

Toona sureni is a species of tree in the mahogany family. It is native to South Asia, Indochina, Malesia, China, and Papua New Guinea. It is commonly known as the suren toon, surian, limpaga, iron redwood or the red cedar (a name also shared with various other trees). It is also known as the Indonesian mahogany or the Vietnamese mahogany. The species is a valuable timber tree.

== Taxonomy ==
Toona sureni belongs to the toon genus Toona of the mahogany family Meliaceae. It was first described by the German-Dutch botanist Carl Ludwig Blume in 1823 as Swietenia sureni. It was transferred to the genus Toona in 1917 by the American botanist Elmer Drew Merrill.

== Description ==
Toona sureni is a medium-sized to large tree, reaching a maximum height of around 40 to 60 m (130 to 200 ft) and a diameter of 100 to 300 cm (39 to 118 in). The bole possesses buttress roots up to a height of 2 m (6.6 ft) and remains unbranched and straight up to a height of 20 to 30 m (66 to 98 ft). The bark is fibrous and flaky in texture with numerous vertical fissures. It is pale brown to whitish or grayish brown in color. When cut, the bark and sapwood produce a pleasant odor reminiscent of cinnamon. The sap is colorless and does not change in color after being exposed to air. The sapwood of Toona sureni is white to pinkish or light red in color, while the heartwood is light red or brown.

The leaves are pinnate and large, with a length of about 29 to 84 cm (11 to 33 in). They are arranged spirally, usually clustered at the ends of twigs. The leaflets are lanceolate to ovate-lanceolate in shape. They are arranged somewhat opposite each other, usually in pairs of 6 to 9, with a maximum of 12 pairs. The upper and lower surfaces of the leaflet midribs are characteristically hairy (pilose).

The inflorescence are terminal, occurring at the tips of branchlets. They are paniculate and pendant, reaching a length of around 40 cm (16 in). The individual flowers are small (around 4 to 5 mm (0.16 to 0.20 in) in length), and are sweetly fragrant. Flowers are individually unisexual, though both male and female flowers occur in the same plant.

The fruits are leathery capsules, around 25 mm (0.98 in) long and brown in color. Each contains more than 100 seeds. The seeds are narrow and usually 11 to 20 mm (0.43 to 0.79 in) in length, with a maximum length of 22 mm (0.87 in); and 1 to 10 mm (0.039 to 0.394 in) in diameter. They are winged at both ends (subequal).

== Ecology ==
Toona sureni is deciduous, shedding their leaves during the dry season (usually February to March or September to October). They produce flowers and fruits twice each year (usually during December to February and April to September).

== Distribution and habitat ==
Toona sureni is native to South Asia (India, Bhutan, and Nepal); Indochina (Myanmar, Laos, Cambodia, Thailand, and Vietnam); China (Guizhou, Hainan, Sichuan, and Yunnan); Malesia (Malaysia, Indonesia, and the Philippines); and Papua New Guinea. They are usually found in primary forests on open hillsides, slopes, ravines, and riverbanks at an altitude of 1,200 to 2,700 m (3,900 to 8,900 ft) asl. They may sometimes also be found in secondary semi-evergreen forests.

== Names ==
The tree is commonly known in English as the "suren toon" (or "suren toona"), "surian", "limpaga", "iron redwood" or the "red cedar". It is also sometimes known as the "Indonesian mahogany" or the "Vietnamese mahogany", though it is not "genuine" mahogany (genus Swietenia). Local names include suren in Indonesia, ye tama in Burma, danupra in the Philippines, surian (สุเหรียน) in Thailand, surian wangi in Malaysia, and zi chun (紫椿) in China.

== Uses ==
Toona sureni, like other members of the mahogany family, are valuable timber trees. They are a source of high quality commercial hardwoods used for high-end furniture work, interior finishing, decorative paneling, musical instruments such as Djembe, and other wood crafts.

The bark extract is also used in traditional medicine as an astringent, purgative, antirheumatic, and for treating gastrointestinal ailments like diarrhea and dysentery. The leaf extracts are used as antibacterial poultices.

They are also planted as ornamentals and shade trees, as well as being used for intercropping.
