= Howmeh-ye Shomali Rural District =

Rural district in Kermanshah province, Iran

Howmeh-ye Shomali Rural District Persian: دهستان حومه شمالي
- Rural District
- Location within Iran
- Coordinates: 34°14′06″N 46°31′27″E
- Country: Iran
- Province: Kermanshah
- County: Shahabad-e Gharb
- District: Central
- Capital: Barzeh

Population (2016)
  - Total: 5,129
- Time zone: UTC+3:30 (IRST)

Howmeh-ye Shomali Rural District (Persian: دهستان حومه شمالي) is in the Central District of Eslamabad-e Gharb County, Kermanshah province, Iran. Its capital is the village of Barzeh.

== Demographics ==
=== Population ===
At the time of the 2006 National Census, the rural district's population was 8,206 in 1,805 households. There were 5,801 inhabitants in 1,390 households at the following census of 2011. The 2016 census measured the population of the rural district as 5,129 in 1,361 households. The most populous of its 26 villages was Choqazard-e Chupankareh, with 844 people.
