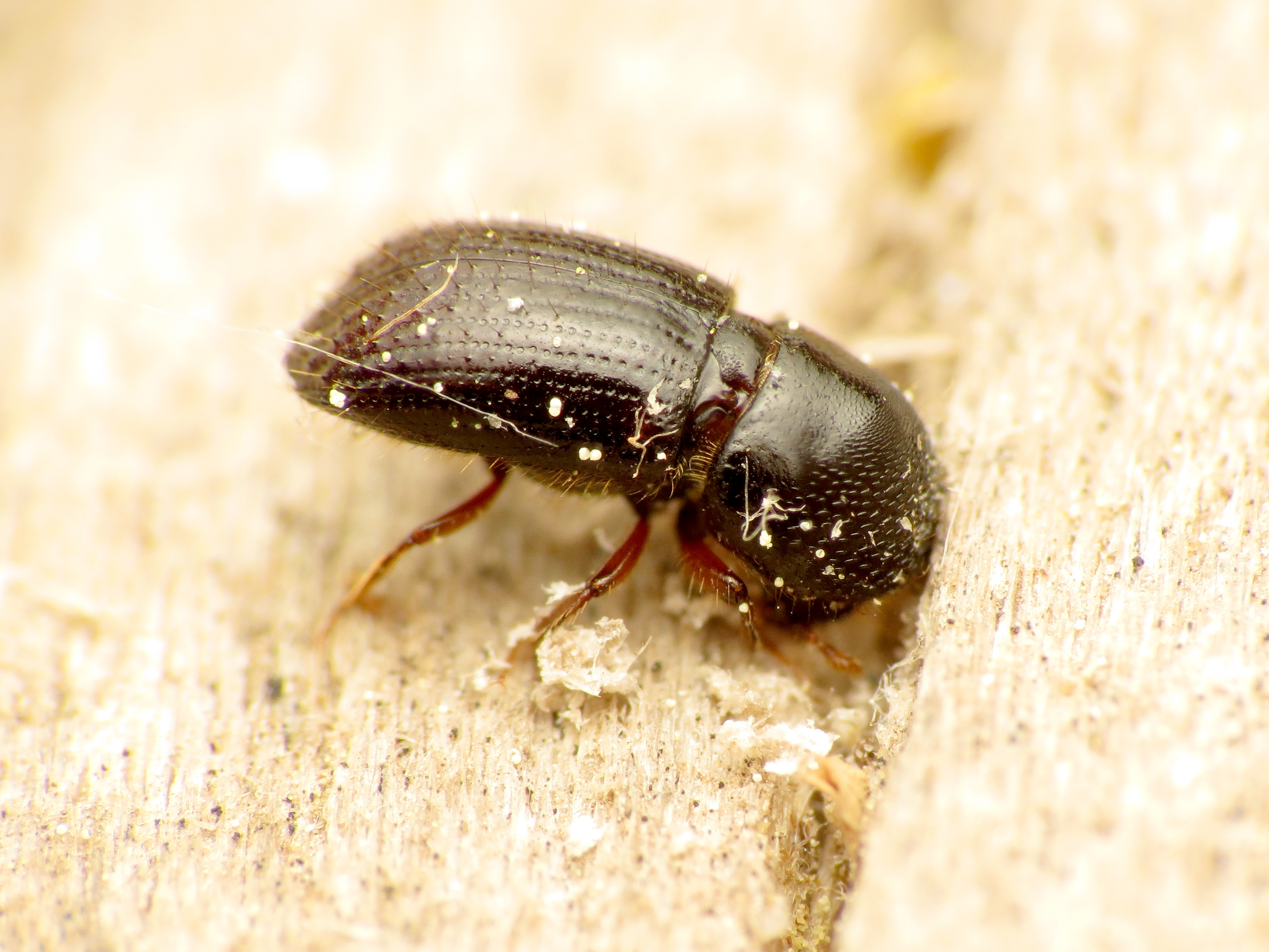

Scientific classification
- Kingdom: Animalia
- Phylum: Arthropoda
- Clade: Pancrustacea
- Class: Insecta
- Order: Coleoptera
- Suborder: Polyphaga
- Infraorder: Cucujiformia
- Superfamily: Curculionoidea
- Family: Curculionidae
- Subfamily: Scolytinae
- Genus: Euwallacea
- Species: E. validus

Binomial name
- Euwallacea validus (Eichhoff, 1875)

= Euwallacea validus =

Species of beetle

Euwallacea validus is a species of Euwallacea beetle native to Asia. The beetle species was discovered in Long Island, New York in 1975. Like other Euwallacea species beetles, E. validus is known for its mutualistic symbiotic relationship with fungi, acting as a vector for Fusarium oligoseptatum and Raffaelea subfusca, often using Tree of Heaven (Ailanthus altissima) as a preferred host. Out of the five confirmed species of Euwallacea spp. in the United States, E. validus is the most widespread and longest established, yet much about their second fungal partner, Raffaelea subfusca, is not known.

== Taxonomy ==
Euwallacea interjectus, the sister species of E. validus, are often identified as E. validus (and vice versa), given their almost identical appearance. E. interjectus and E. validus were introduced to the United States around the same time in the late 1900s. Both species have overlapping habitats in the United States, mostly in Georgia and South Carolina, leading to frequent misidentification. The discovery of E. interjectus in Florida (2011) and Texas (2011), prompted investigation into E. validus. E. interjectus infestation on their variety of plant hosts has a global impact because the plant hosts are critical to the lumber and the production of board products.

Both species are morphologically similar, varying in slight manners. Morphologically, E. interjectus and E. validus can be differentiated by slight differences in the shape of declivity, punctures, and placement of tubercles on the body of the species. The two also vary by fungal association and host species. With the help of DNA sequencing, proper identification between the two species has become easier.

== Description ==
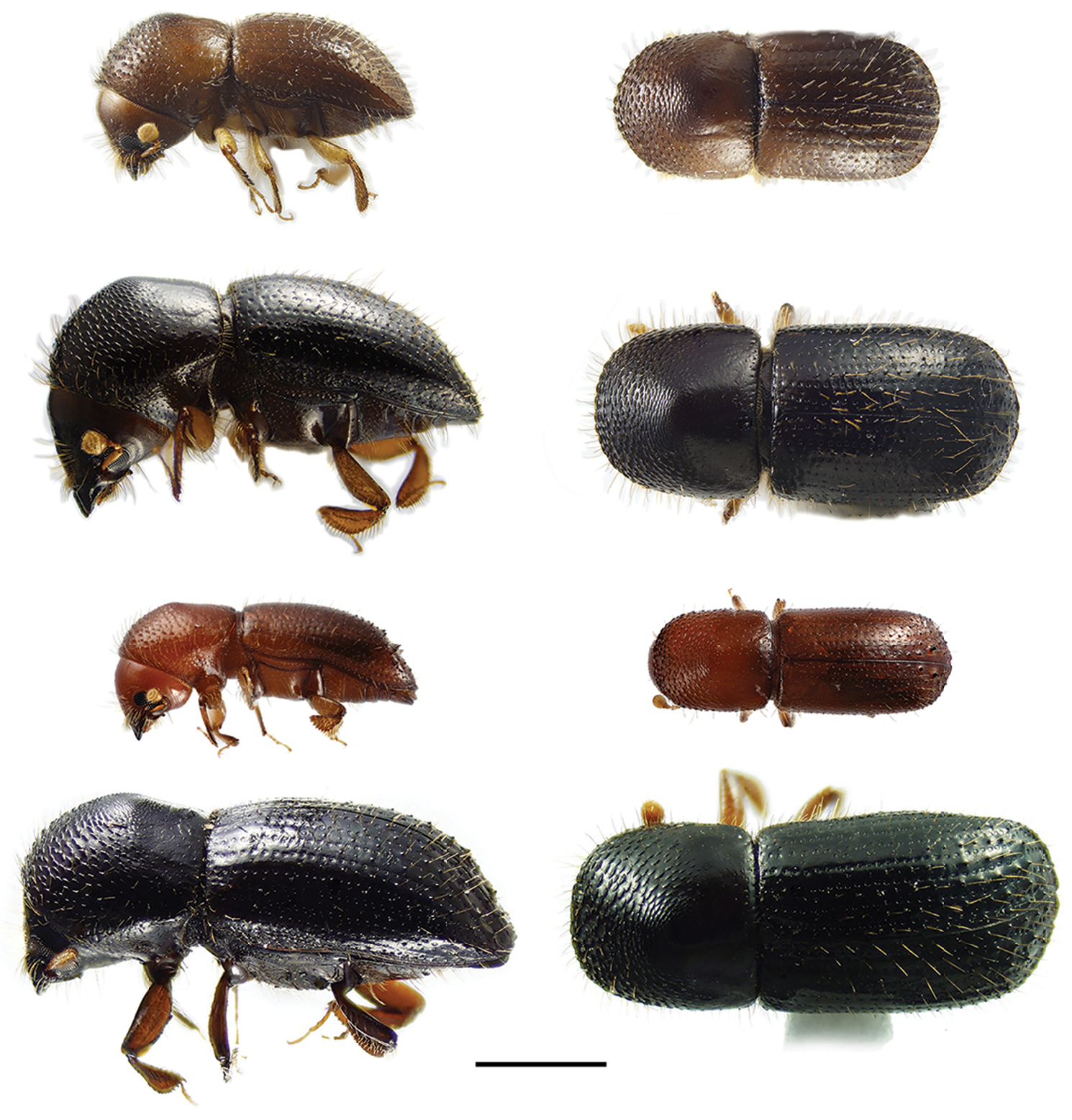
Lateral and dorsal views of Euwallacea species. From top left, Euwallacea fornicatus, E. interjectus, E. similis and E. validus. Scale bar: 1.0 mm.

An adult E. validus can range from 3.9 to 4.1 mm in length, with an average of 4.0 mm. The species ranges in width from 2.5 to 2.73 mm. Similar to E. interjectus, the beetles range from dark brown to black. E. validus and the Euwallacea species are known for their pronotum, a plate-like structure that acts protection near the thorax, and spindles that cover a beetle's body. Moreover, given that sexual dimorphism is present, males are significantly smaller than females. Females play a major role in the distribution of fungi, and males are reduced in size. Females distribute the fungi in mycangia, a structure that enables the beetle to store fungi, which are present in females and rarely in males.

Compared to E. interjectus, downward angle of the slope from base to apex of the beetle differs in E. validus.

Fungus is carried in the mycangia and the head, and adult females harbor the fungus paired with pre-oral mycangia. Mycangia, and other specialized organs, have been developed in E. valdius as an evolution of symbiosis with fungi. It was discovered that the organization of the mycangia is positioned between the eye and esophagus, rather than paired in front of the head.

== Distribution and habitat ==
Euwallacea validus originated from Asia, as a descendant of other Asian Ambrosia beetles. The species can be primarily found in Asia. They are present in China, Malaysia, Myanmar, Vietnam, the Philippines, Japan, and Korea. Moreover, the species expanded from Asia and was first observed in the United States in 1975. Since then, the North American presence has been amplified. The species has expanded to Canada and all over the United States.

=== Presence in the United States of America ===
Euwallacea validus was first discovered in Nassau County, New York in 1975 and is assumed to have spread throughout the eastern United States, as the beetles were collected repeatedly from widely separated localities. It is also believed that the species entered the United States from wooden packing crates from Japan at various ports. Eventually these beetles moved south, being seen in Pennsylvania in 1980 and Louisiana in 1984. The discovery of E. interjectus in Florida and Texas in 2011 was the catalyst for research in E. validus to understand the distribution of E. interjectus and E. validus properly.

As of 2014, the distribution of this species includes Delaware, Maryland, New Jersey (1996), Pennsylvania, Virginia, and West Virginia (1991), North Carolina (2011), Kentucky (2012), Michigan (2006), Georgia (2012) and Tennessee (2010). However, past habitat distribution in the South may not be accurate, given E. interjectus habit distribution, and additional research is needed to confirm E. validus distribution in the United States.

== Life cycle ==
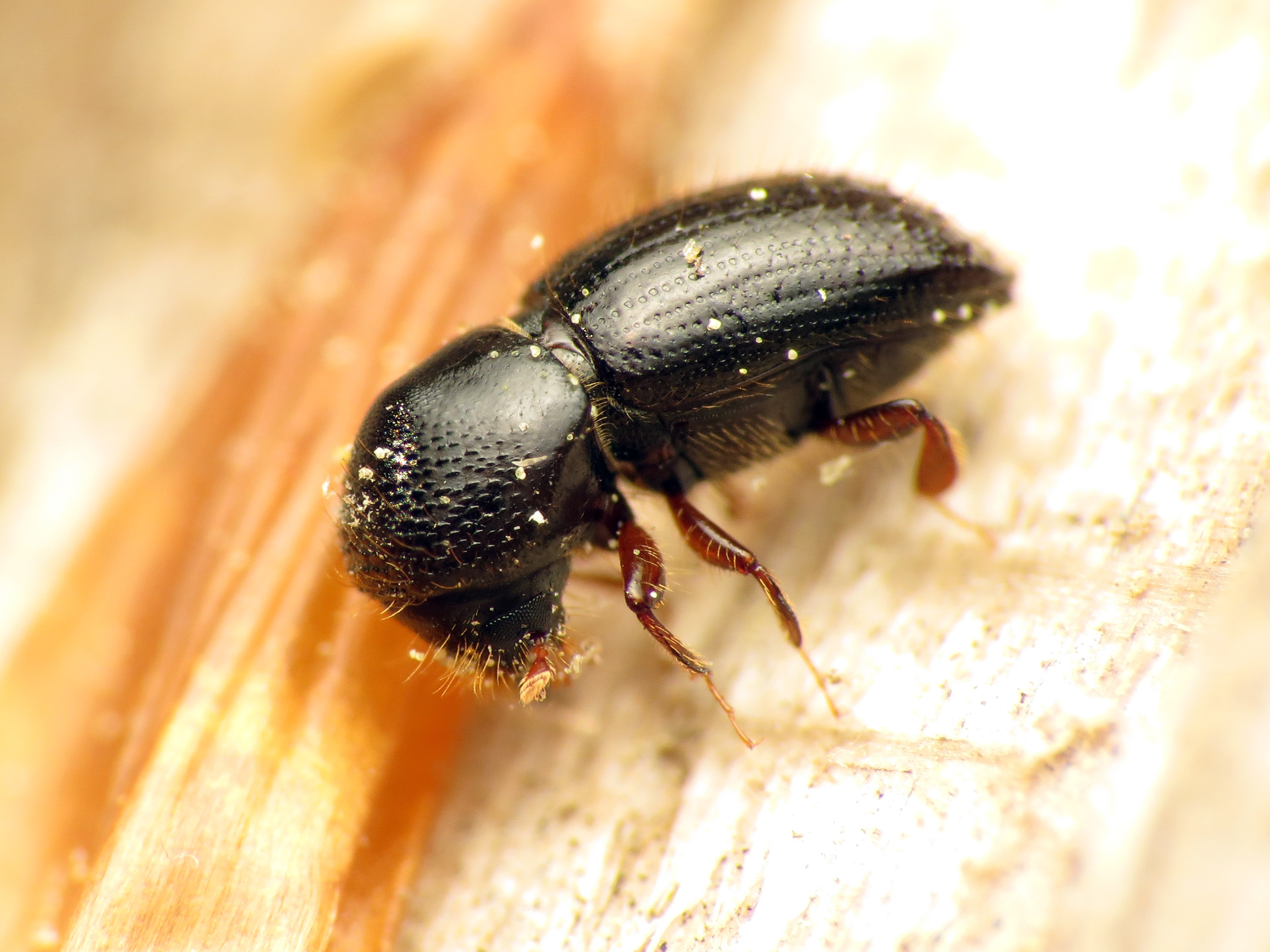

The Euwallacea validus life cycle has not been extensively studied, however, some research has provided insight into the life cycle and development process of the species. Euwallacea species reproduce via haplodiploid sibling mating. In this type of mating, diploid fertilized eggs develop into female offspring. The unfertilized haploid eggs develop into the males of the colonies, after development, the males mate with siblings in the same gallery.

Euwallacea validus females are critical in the symbiosis with F. oligoseptaum and Raffaelea subfusca by dispersing the fungi between host trees. Given the role that females play as a vector, the species exhibits sexual dimorphism. Males are reduced in size, having smaller wings, mandibles, and are flightless. Given their reduced musculature, suggesting a similar reduction in chewing strength, their role in the gallery is reproduction and potential fungal maintenance.

Like other Euwallacea species, E. validus develops from a larva to the early pupa and then to the late pupa. Sexual dimorphism can be seen in the early stages of pupa development. Research has shown the development of both superior mycangia and inferior structures in the late pupal stages of females.

== Diet ==
Ambrosia beetles typically use dead trees but occasionally use healthy trees as hosts to cultivate ambrosia fungi. Female Euwallacea beetles transfer their fungal associates in their mandibular mycangia, from their natal gallery to hosts. There they cultivate galleries as a food source, thus exemplifying a mutualistic symbiotic relationship.

== Relationship with fungi ==
Euwallacea validus has a mutualistic symbiotic relationship with fungi of the Ambrosia Fusarium clade (AFC). As of 2018, only 3 of the 16 species within the Ambrosia Fusarium clade had been described formally. Phylogenetic analysis of the Ambrosia Fusarium Clade and Euwallacea species found evidence of repeat host shifts rather than stretches of coevolution or mutualism.

=== Similarities to Euwallacea fornicatus ===
Euwallacea species and their fungal associates are known to cause canker incidence and overall damage to their plant hosts. E. interjectus host plants are crucial to the lumber industry, and E. Fornicatus elicits disease on avocado trees in California and Israel.

Euwallacea validus cultivates two fungal symbionts in the U.S., an unnamed Fusarium species (AF-4) and Raffaelea subfusca. E. Fornicatus fungal symbiont is similar to a fungus carried by E. fornicatus. Because of the impact of E. fornicatus, more information on Fusarium sp. AF-4 and E. validus serves as valuable insight on the impact of Euwallacea beetles on the environment.

=== Fusarium species (AF-4) and Raffaelea subfusca ===
Research has revealed that neither Fusarium species AF-4 nor Raffealea symbionts caused significant disease on any host tested and do not appear to pose serious risks to the known hosts within the invaded range of this beetle.

Euwallacea validus and its respective fungi associations show a unique relationship. Compared to other Euwallacea species fidelity was observed in E. validus and Fusarium sp. AF-4 in South Korea and the United states with no indication that other members of AFC members that compete within the mycangial communities. Other Euwallacea species beetles do not exhibit this obvious fidelity between native and invaded ranges. Studies show that there is not an exclusive relationship with particular fungi. Other known AFC lineages that are present in the US were uncovered from the mycangia of other Euwallacea species within the geographic origin of beetles in East Asia.

Moreover, other FSSC isolates can be found in galleries of Euwalllacea species, indicating frequent interactions between symbiotic and asymbiotic FSSC members. This relationship of widespread fungal infidelity among closely related Euwallacea beetles allows for novel beetle fungus combinations that can incite diseases amongst many orchard, landscapes, and forest trees.

R. subfusca, E. validus's second symbiont, is unique to the species, and the fungus is found in equal proportion to Fusarium sp. AF-4 in the mycangia. Other similar fungi have caused Japanese and Korean oak wilt, and laurel wilt.

=== Hosts ===
Like most ambrosia beetles, the Euwallacea species, are not particularly selective when choosing a plant host.

Tree of Heaven (Ailanthus altissima) was found to be a preferred host and large-scale infestations have been observed in stands of Ailanthus infected with Verticillium wilt. Of the seventeen confirmed native hosts, E. validus attacks were found to be more geographically widespread on several hosts including striped maple, red maple, tulip-poplar, and American beech.

Some trees identified as hosts of E. validus, but not confirmed reproductive hosts. Instead, they are perhaps overwintering spots for the adult female beetles as evidenced by the short non-branching hibernation. When the spring season begins, beetles may emerge and find a suitable host to establish natal galleries. E. validus does so by creating bores into a tree. The living tissues of a tree are then exposed to fungal symbionts. It is possible for subsequent infection by another species, even if the tree species is not suitable as a host for reproduction. Studies have shown that none of the fungi that E. valdius affiliates with are virulent pathogens, but the beetle can transmit pathogens from one tree to another.
