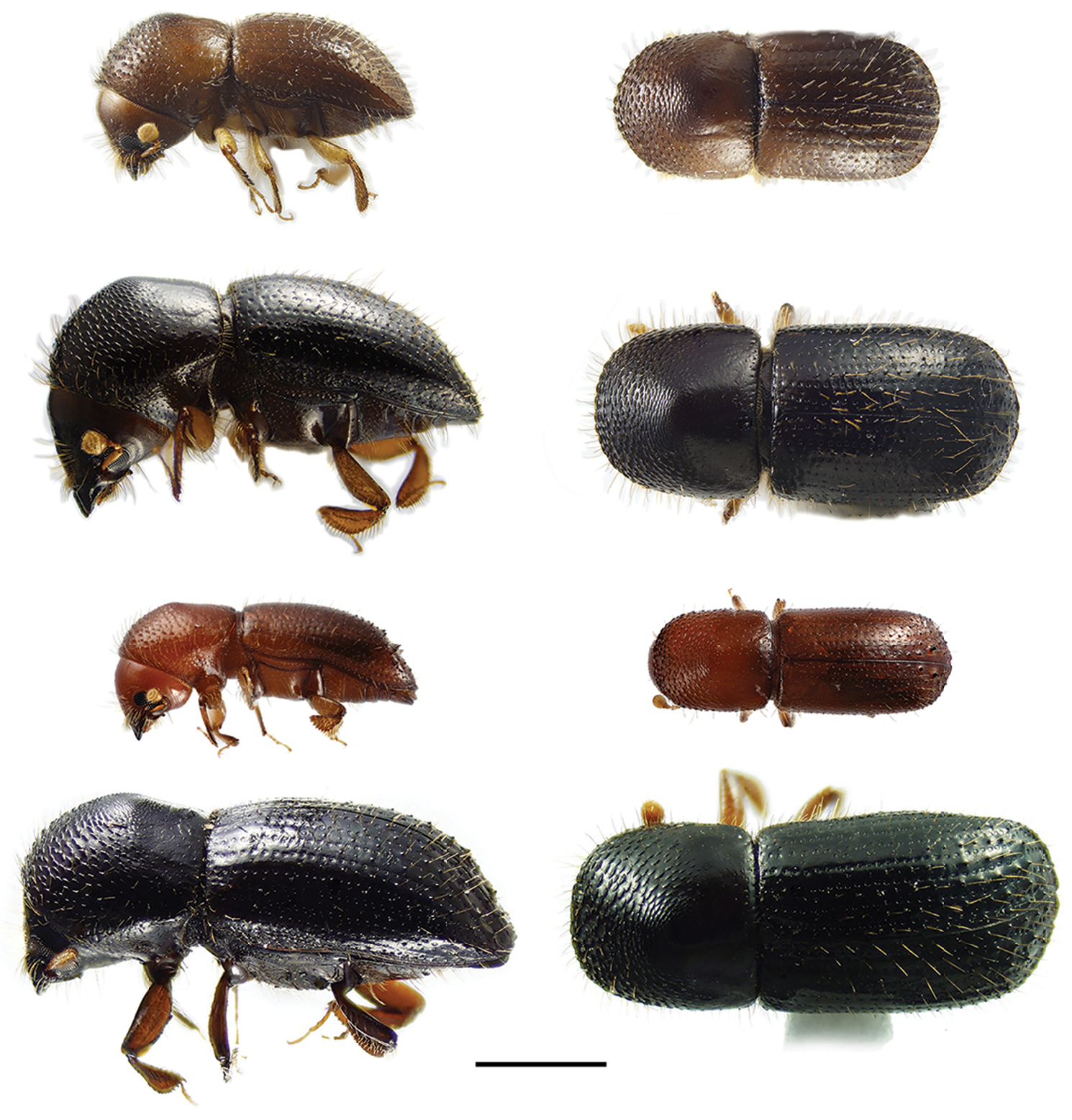
- Lateral and dorsal views of Euwallacea species. From top left, Euwallacea fornicatus, E. interjectus, E. similis and E. validus

Scientific classification
- Kingdom: Animalia
- Phylum: Arthropoda
- Class: Insecta
- Order: Coleoptera
- Suborder: Polyphaga
- Infraorder: Cucujiformia
- Family: Curculionidae
- Subfamily: Scolytinae
- Tribe: Xyleborini
- Genus: Euwallacea; A.D. Hopkins, 1915

Synonyms
- Wallacellus

= Euwallacea =

Genus of beetles

Euwallacea is a genus of typical bark beetles in the family Curculionidae. They are commonly known as Ambrosia beetles, as all species are symbiotic with Ambrosia fungi. Originally from Asia or Wallacea, they are now found worldwide. Many species are pests, causing damage to, or the death of, tree species valued for their fruit or timber.

== Species ==
The following species are recognized in this genus:

- Euwallacea alastos Smith, Beaver & Cognato, 2022
- Euwallacea andamanensis (Blandford, 1989)
- Euwallacea aplanatus (Whichman, 1992)
- Euwallacea artelaevis (Schedl, 1942)
- Euwallacea barbatulus (Schedl, 1934)
- Euwallacea barbatus (Hagedorn, 1910)
- Euwallacea benguetensis (Schedl, 1951)
- Euwallacea bicolor Wood & Bright, 1992
- Euwallacea caraibicus (Eggers, 1941)
- Euwallacea comptus Wood & Bright, 1992
- Euwallacea destruens (Blandford, 1896)
- Euwallacea dilatatiformis (Schedl, 1971)
- Euwallacea filiformis (Schedl, 1975)
- Euwallacea fornicatus (Eichhoff, 1868)
- Euwallacea fulvus (Murayama, 1936)
- Euwallacea funereus Hulcr & Cognato, 2010
- Euwallacea galeatus (Blandford, 1984)
- Euwallacea geminus Smith, Beaver & Cognato, 2020
- Euwallacea goloanus Browne, 1974
- Euwallacea granosus (Schedl, 1957)
- Euwallacea illustrius Schedl, 1939
- Euwallacea imitans Eggers, 1927
- Euwallacea insolitus Smith & Beaver, 2022
- Euwallacea interjectus (Blandford, 1894)
- Euwallacea kersianus Bright & Skidmore, 1997
- Euwallacea khayae (Schedl, 1957)
- Euwallacea koroensis Wood & Bright, 1992
- Euwallacea kuroshio Gomez & Hulcr, 2018
- Euwallacea laevis Wood & Bright, 1992
- Euwallacea limatus Wood & Bright, 1992
- Euwallacea loricatus Wood & Bright, 1992
- Euwallacea luctuosus Wood & Bright, 1992
- Euwallacea lugubris Wood & Bright, 1992
- Euwallacea malloti Wood & Bright, 1992
- Euwallacea metanepotulus Wood & Bright, 1992
- Euwallacea minutus (Blandford, 1894)
- Euwallacea murudensis Bright & Skidmore, 1997
- Euwallacea neptis Smith, Beaver & Cognato, 2020
- Euwallacea nigrosetosus Wood & Bright, 1992
- Euwallacea oparunus Wood & Bright, 1992
- Euwallacea pandae Wood & Bright, 1992
- Euwallacea perbrevis (Schedl, 1951)
- Euwallacea piceus (Motschulsky, 1863)
- Euwallacea procerrimus Wood & Bright, 1992
- Euwallacea procerrissimus Wood & Bright, 1992
- Euwallacea quadraticollis Wood & Bright, 1992
- Euwallacea rufoniger Wood & Bright, 1992
- Euwallacea russulus Wood & Bright, 1992
- Euwallacea samoensis Beeson, 1929
- Euwallacea semiermis (Schedl, 1934)
- Euwallacea semirudis (Blandford, 1896)
- Euwallacea sibsagaricus Wood & Bright, 1992
- Euwallacea similis (Schedl, 1953)
- Euwallacea solomonicus Wood & Bright, 1992
- Euwallacea streblicola Hopkins, 1915
- Euwallacea striatulus (Browne, 1980)
- Euwallacea strombiformis Wood & Bright, 1992
- Euwallacea subalpinus Smith, Beaver & Cognato, 2020
- Euwallacea subcoriaceus Eggers, 1927
- Euwallacea subemarginatus Bright & Skidmore, 2002
- Euwallacea subparallelus Wood & Bright, 1992
- Euwallacea talumalai Wood & Bright, 1992
- Euwallacea testudinatus Smith, Beaver & Cognato, 2020
- Euwallacea tonkinensis Wood & Bright, 1992
- Euwallacea trapezicollis Wood & Bright, 1992
- Euwallacea tristis Wood & Bright, 1992
- Euwallacea tumidus Wood & Bright, 1992
- Euwallacea validus (Eichhoff, 1875)
- Euwallacea velatus Wood & Bright, 1992
- Euwallacea viruensis Bright & Skidmore, 1997
- Euwallacea voarotrae Wood & Bright, 1992
- Euwallacea wallacei Hopkins, 1915
- Euwallacea whitfordiodendrus (Schedl, 1942)
- Euwallacea xanthopus Wood & Bright, 1992
- Euwallacea zicsii Wood & Bright, 1992
