= Sueus =

Scientific classification
- Kingdom: Animalia
- Phylum: Arthropoda
- Clade: Pancrustacea
- Class: Insecta
- Order: Coleoptera
- Suborder: Polyphaga
- Infraorder: Cucujiformia
- Superfamily: Curculionoidea
- Family: Curculionidae
- Subfamily: Scolytinae
- Genus: Sueus; Murayama, 1951

Type species
- Sueus sphaerotrypoides Murayama, 1951

Synonyms
- Neohyorrhynchus Schedl, 1962; Parasphaerotrypes Murayama, 1958

Genus of beetles

Sueus is a genus of ambrosia beetles in the weevil subfamily Scolytinae. It is primarily distributed in South, Southeast, and East Asia as well as Oceania; long-distance dispersal is facilitated by its reproductive system and there is a record from Martinique.

== Description ==
Sueus females measure 1.6–3.0 mm (0.063–0.118 in) in body length. Males are haploid and smaller than females that are diploid. The body is black and about twice as long as it is wide.

== Ecology ==
Based on Sueus niisimai, all species are assumed to create brood galleries in various tree species and cultivate and consume symbiotic ambrosia fungi. Although no species is known to have caused declines in host trees, they are potential pests.

Reproduction involves inbreeding and haplo-diploid sex determination; males are rare.

== Species ==
There are eight recognized species:

- Sueus borneensis Bright, 1994
- Sueus chatterjeei Smith & Cognato, 2024
- Sueus granulatus (Eggers, 1936)
- Sueus insulanus Schiffer, Smith & Cognato, 2024
- Sueus niisimai (Eggers, 1926)
- Sueus obesus (Browne, 1977)
- Sueus pilosus (Eggers, 1936)
- Sueus striatulus (Schedl, 1954)
