= Treptoplatypus solidus =

Scientific classification
- Kingdom: Animalia
- Phylum: Arthropoda
- Class: Insecta
- Order: Coleoptera
- Suborder: Polyphaga
- Infraorder: Cucujiformia
- Family: Curculionidae
- Subfamily: Platypodinae
- Tribe: Platypodini
- Genus: Treptoplatypus
- Species: T. solidus

Binomial name
- Treptoplatypus solidus (Walker, 1859)

Synonyms
- Platypus cordatus von Motschulsky, 1863; Platypus pilifrons Chapuis, 1865; Platypus solidus Walker, 1859; Platypus solidus exilis Chapuis, 1865; Platypus solidus obtusus Chapuis, 1865; Platypus solidus rudis Chapuis, 1865

Species of beetle

Treptoplatypus solidus, is a species of weevil found in Asia and Australia.

== Description ==
Body length is about 0.20 mm. The females have a pitted area that is almost V-shaped in outline. There are about 50 pits that have a slender and small inner process. The males do not have any integumentary pits in pronotum. Forecoxal and mesocoxal cavities are mycetangium-shaped.
