= Genyocerus albipennis =

Scientific classification
- Kingdom: Animalia
- Phylum: Arthropoda
- Class: Insecta
- Order: Coleoptera
- Suborder: Polyphaga
- Infraorder: Cucujiformia
- Family: Curculionidae
- Subfamily: Platypodinae
- Tribe: Tesserocerini
- Genus: Genyocerus
- Species: G. albipennis

Binomial name
- Genyocerus albipennis Motschulsky, 1858

Synonyms
- Diacavus irregularis Browne, 1970

Species of beetle

Genyocerus albipennis is a species of weevil endemic to Sri Lanka.

== Description ==
In 1958, Victor Motschulsky formed the genus Genyocerus by citing G. albipennis as the type species.

The beetle is only identified from the tree Dipterocarpus zeylanicus.
