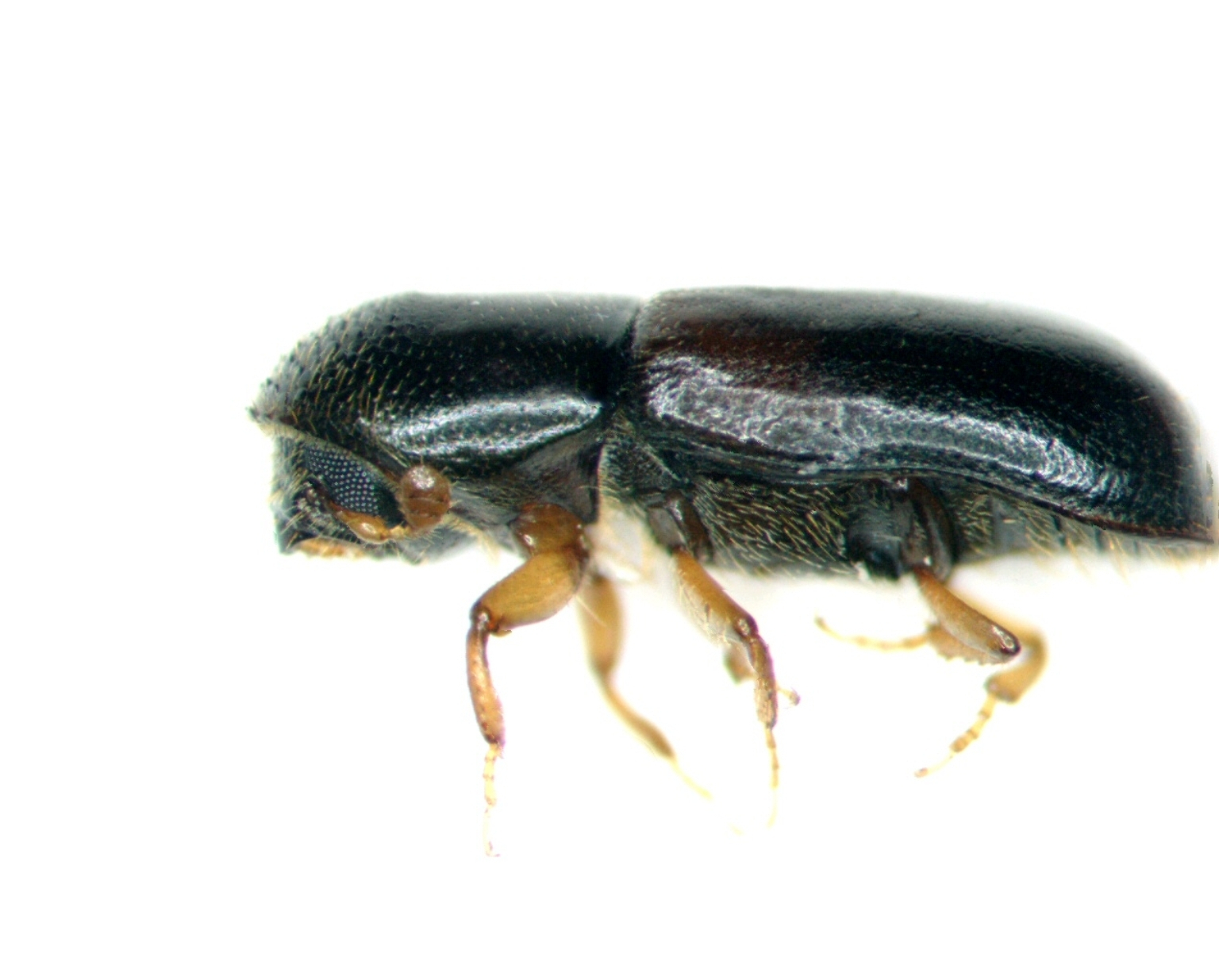
- An adult Gnathotrichus materiarius

Scientific classification
- Kingdom: Animalia
- Phylum: Arthropoda
- Clade: Pancrustacea
- Class: Insecta
- Order: Coleoptera
- Suborder: Polyphaga
- Infraorder: Cucujiformia
- Superfamily: Curculionoidea
- Family: Curculionidae
- Subfamily: Scolytinae
- Subtribe: Corthylina
- Genus: Gnathotrichus; Eichhoff, 1869

= Gnathotrichus =

Genus of beetles

Gnathotrichus is a genus of ambrosia beetles in the family Curculionidae. The genus is naturally distributed in the North and Central America, but Gnathotrichus materiarius has been introduced to Europe where it is now widespread.

Gnathotrichus measure 2.0–3.7 mm (0.079–0.146 in) in length and are about 2.9–3.3 times as long as wide. They are light brown to almost black in color.

== Species ==
These 41 species belong to the genus Gnathotrichus:

- Gnathotrichus aciculatus Blackman, 1931b^{c}
- Gnathotrichus alni Blackman, 1931b^{c}
- Gnathotrichus alniphagus Wood, 1984e^{c}
- Gnathotrichus barbifer Schedl, 1967d^{c}
- Gnathotrichus bituberculatus Blandford, 1904^{c}
- Gnathotrichus castaneus Schedl, 1972d^{c}
- Gnathotrichus consentaneus Blandford, 1904^{c}
- Gnathotrichus consobrinus Eichhoff, 1878b^{c}
- Gnathotrichus corthyliformis Schedl, 1964m^{c}
- Gnathotrichus corthyloides Schedl, 1951d^{c}
- Gnathotrichus deleoni Blackman, 1942a^{c}
- Gnathotrichus dentatus Wood, 1967d^{c}
- Gnathotrichus denticulatus Blackman, 1931^{i c b}
- Gnathotrichus fimbriatus Schedl, 1955e^{c}
- Gnathotrichus fossor Bright & Poinar, 1994^{c}
- Gnathotrichus frontalis Schedl, 1972d^{c}
- Gnathotrichus herbertfranzi Schedl, 1972d^{c}
- Gnathotrichus imitans Wood, 1967^{i c}
- Gnathotrichus impressus Schedl, 1977e^{c}
- Gnathotrichus longicollis Schedl, 1951m^{c}
- Gnathotrichus longipennis Eichhoff, 1878b^{c}
- Gnathotrichus longiusculus Schedl, 1951m^{c}
- Gnathotrichus materiarius (Fitch, 1858)^{i c b} (American utilizable wood bark beetle)
- Gnathotrichus nanulus Schedl, 1972d^{c}
- Gnathotrichus nanus Eichhoff, 1878b^{c}
- Gnathotrichus nimifrons Wood, 1967^{i c}
- Gnathotrichus nitidifrons Hopkins, 1905b^{c}
- Gnathotrichus obnixus Schedl, 1939h^{c}
- Gnathotrichus obscurus Wood, 1974a^{c}
- Gnathotrichus occidentalis Blackman (Hopkins in), 1931b^{c}
- Gnathotrichus omissus Wood, 1974a^{c}
- Gnathotrichus perniciosus Wood, 1967d^{c}
- Gnathotrichus pilosus (LeConte, 1868)^{i c b}
- Gnathotrichus primus Wood & Bright, 1992^{c}
- Gnathotrichus quadrituberculatus Schedl, 1951m^{c}
- Gnathotrichus retusus (LeConte, 1868)^{i c b} (western pinewood stainer)
- Gnathotrichus saltoni Blackman, 1938a^{c}
- Gnathotrichus sericeus Bright & Skidmore, 1997^{c}
- Gnathotrichus sextuberculatus Schedl, 1951m^{c}
- Gnathotrichus sulcatus (LeConte, 1868)^{i c b} (western hemlock wood stainer)
- Gnathotrichus vafer Schedl, 1975d^{c}

Data sources: i = ITIS, c = Catalogue of Life, b = Bugguide.net
