= Euplatypus parallelus =

Scientific classification
- Domain: Eukaryota
- Kingdom: Animalia
- Phylum: Arthropoda
- Class: Insecta
- Order: Coleoptera
- Suborder: Polyphaga
- Infraorder: Cucujiformia
- Family: Curculionidae
- Genus: Euplatypus
- Species: E. parallelus

Binomial name
- Euplatypus parallelus (Fabricius, 1801)

Synonyms
- Platypus parallelus (Fabricius, 1801)

Species of beetle

Euplatypus parallelus, previously known as Platypus parallelus, is a species of ambrosia beetle in the weevil family Curculionidae. The adults and larvae form galleries in various species of tree and logs. It is native to Central and South America but has spread globally, is present in Africa and is well established in tropical Asia.

== Description ==
Adult beetles are between 3.8 and 4.5 mm (0.15 and 0.18 in) in length and are a yellowish-brown to brown colour, the elytra having darker brown tips. The holes excavated by the adults and larvae are about 1 mm (0.04 in) in diameter.

== Distribution and habitat ==
Euplatypus parallelus is native to Central and South America, but has spread invasively to Africa, tropical southern Asia, Wallacea and New Guinea, probably via timber imports. It arrived in Africa in the late 1800s and was first recorded in Asia after World War II, became widespread in Sri Lanka in the 1970s and was present in Malaysia, Thailand and Indonesia by the 1980s. It soon became the most significant ambrosia beetle in Thailand, attacking both living trees, typically stressed or diseased specimens, and recently fallen or cut timber. It has been reported in over 80 species of tree from 25 families, including live rubber trees in Brazil and Indian rosewood in Bangladesh. The first recordings from China were made on Hainan Island in 2016.

== Ecology ==
The male beetle excavates a short tunnel in the bark of the host tree or log and then releases a pheromone on the surface which attracts a female. After mating, the female enters the tunnel and creates an extensive series of galleries in which the eggs are laid. Like other ambrosia beetles, the adults carry with them a fungal culture with which they inoculate the walls of the galleries; the female and developing larvae feed exclusively on the mycelia of this cultivated fungal garden. The wood beside the galleries is blackened by the fungus and frass is pushed out of the entrance hole in long strings. After pupation, the new adults emerge into the open through the original entrance hole. The beetles sometimes introduce pathogenic fungi into the tree and have been implicated in transmitting Fusarium, the cause of a wilt disease, in southern Asia.
