= Gnathotrichus denticulatus =

Scientific classification
- Domain: Eukaryota
- Kingdom: Animalia
- Phylum: Arthropoda
- Class: Insecta
- Order: Coleoptera
- Suborder: Polyphaga
- Infraorder: Cucujiformia
- Family: Curculionidae
- Genus: Gnathotrichus
- Species: G. denticulatus

Binomial name
- Gnathotrichus denticulatus Blackman, 1931

Species of beetle

Gnathotrichus denticulatus is a species of ambrosia beetle in the family Curculionidae. It is found in North America.
