= Gnathotrichus sulcatus =

Scientific classification
- Kingdom: Animalia
- Phylum: Arthropoda
- Class: Insecta
- Order: Coleoptera
- Suborder: Polyphaga
- Infraorder: Cucujiformia
- Family: Curculionidae
- Genus: Gnathotrichus
- Species: G. sulcatus

Binomial name
- Gnathotrichus sulcatus (LeConte, 1868)

Species of beetle

Gnathotrichus sulcatus, the western hemlock wood stainer, is a species of ambrosia beetle in the family Curculionidae. It is found in North America.
