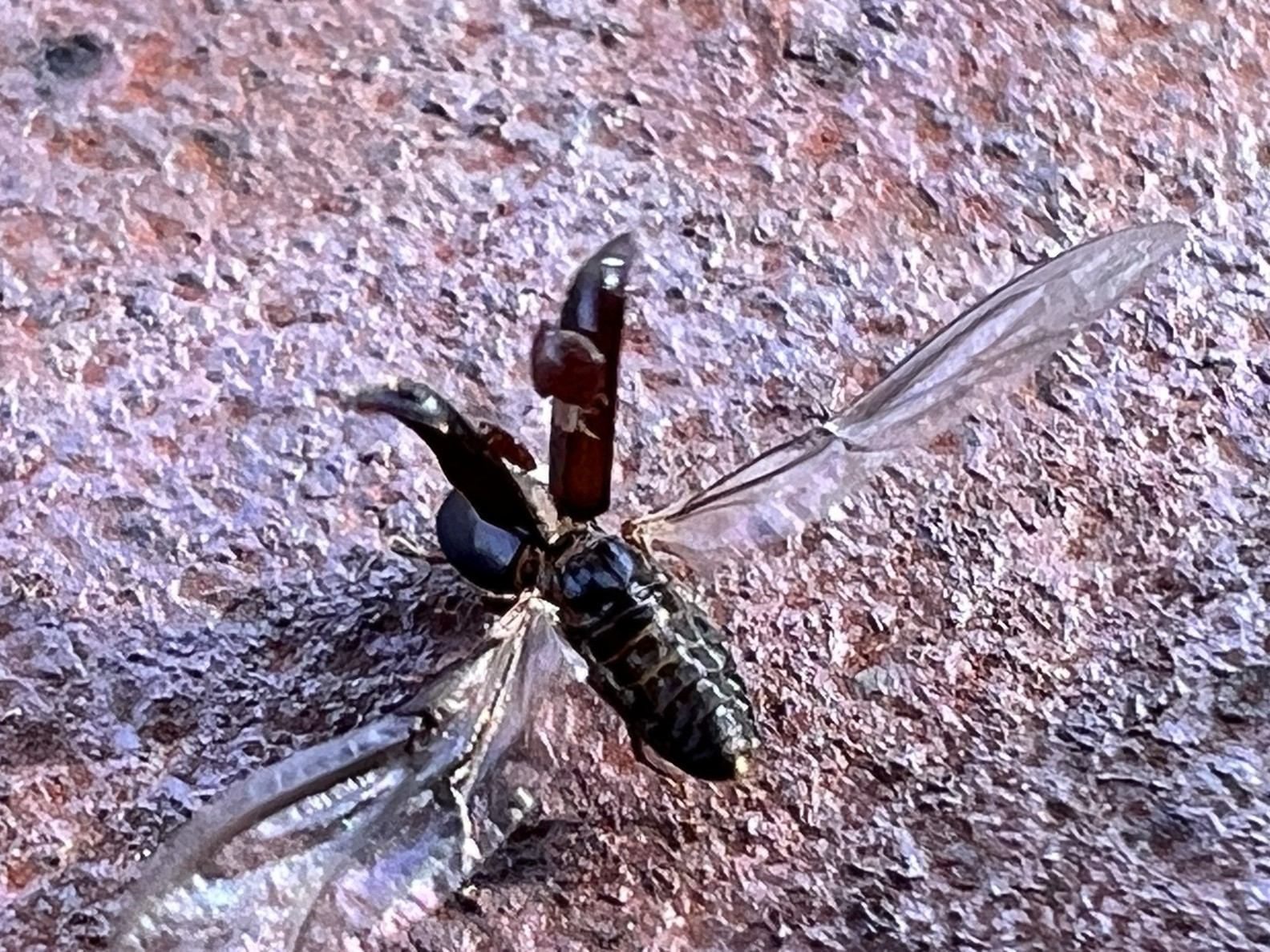

Scientific classification
- Domain: Eukaryota
- Kingdom: Animalia
- Phylum: Arthropoda
- Class: Insecta
- Order: Coleoptera
- Suborder: Polyphaga
- Infraorder: Cucujiformia
- Family: Curculionidae
- Genus: Gnathotrichus
- Species: G. retusus

Binomial name
- Gnathotrichus retusus (LeConte, 1868)

= Gnathotrichus retusus =

Species of beetle

Gnathotrichus retusus, the western pinewood stainer, is a species of ambrosia beetle in the family Curculionidae. It is found in North America.
