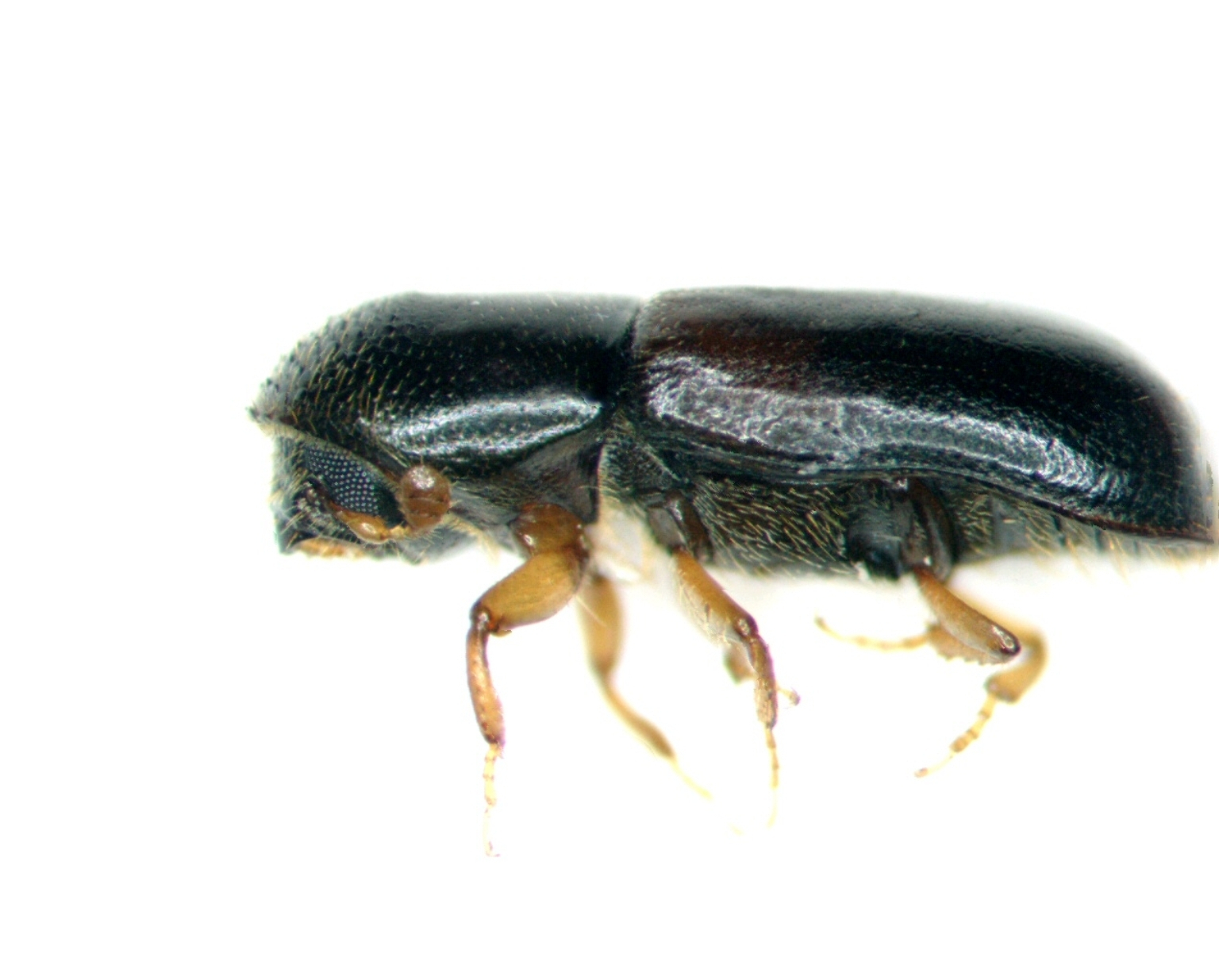
- An adult Gnathotrichus materiarius

Scientific classification
- Kingdom: Animalia
- Phylum: Arthropoda
- Class: Insecta
- Order: Coleoptera
- Suborder: Polyphaga
- Infraorder: Cucujiformia
- Family: Curculionidae
- Genus: Gnathotrichus
- Species: G. materiarius

Binomial name
- Gnathotrichus materiarius (Fitch, 1858)

Synonyms
- Xyleborus duprezi Hoffmann, 1936 Paraxyleborus duprezi Hoffmann, 1942 Gnathotrichus duprezi Hoffmann, 1947

= Gnathotrichus materiarius =

Species of beetle

Gnathotrichus materiarius, the American utilizable wood bark beetle, is an ambrosia beetle in the family Curculionidae. It is native to North America, but has been introduced to several European countries. It lives in symbiosis with the fungus Endomycopsis fasciculata, which adult beetles inoculate into the wood of host trees - the fungus then acts as the primary food source of the larvae and adults.
