= Genyocerus =

Scientific classification
- Domain: Eukaryota
- Kingdom: Animalia
- Phylum: Arthropoda
- Class: Insecta
- Order: Coleoptera
- Suborder: Polyphaga
- Infraorder: Cucujiformia
- Family: Curculionidae
- Subfamily: Platypodinae
- Tribe: Tesserocerini
- Genus: Genyocerus; Motschulsky, V. de, 1858

Type species
- Genyocerus albipennis Motschulsky, 1858

Synonyms
- Goniocerus Motschoulsky, 1868

Genus of beetles

Genyocerus is a genus of pinhole borers in the beetle family Curculionidae. There are more than 30 described species in Genyocerus.

== Species ==
These 33 species belong to the genus Genyocerus:

- Genyocerus abdominalis Wood & Bright, 1992
- Genyocerus adustipennis Motschulsky, 1858?
- Genyocerus albipennis Motschulsky, 1858
- Genyocerus atkinsoni Beeson, 1941
- Genyocerus biporus Wood & Bright, 1992
- Genyocerus borneensis Bright & Skidmore, 2002
- Genyocerus compactus Wood, 1969
- Genyocerus decemspinatus Wood, 1969
- Genyocerus diaphanus Wood, 1969
- Genyocerus dipterocarpi Beeson, 1941
- Genyocerus exilis Wood & Bright, 1992
- Genyocerus fergussonus Roberts, 1993
- Genyocerus frontalis Wood, 1969
- Genyocerus intermedius Wood, 1969
- Genyocerus laticollis Wood, 1969
- Genyocerus mirus Wood, 1969
- Genyocerus multiporus Wood, 1969
- Genyocerus papuanus Roberts, 1993
- Genyocerus pendleburyi Bright & Skidmore, 2002
- Genyocerus philippinensis Wood, 1969
- Genyocerus plumatus Wood & Bright, 1992
- Genyocerus puer Roberts, 1993
- Genyocerus quadrifoveolatus Wood & Bright, 1992
- Genyocerus quadriporus Wood, 1969
- Genyocerus serratus Wood, 1969
- Genyocerus sexporus Wood, 1969
- Genyocerus shoreae Browne, 1981
- Genyocerus spinatus Bright & Skidmore, 2002
- Genyocerus strohmeyeri Wood, 1992
- Genyocerus talurae Wood & Bright, 1992
- Genyocerus tenellus Wood & Bright, 1992
- Genyocerus trispinatus Roberts, 1993
- Genyocerus zeylanicus Beeson, 1961
