= Gnathotrichus pilosus =

Scientific classification
- Domain: Eukaryota
- Kingdom: Animalia
- Phylum: Arthropoda
- Class: Insecta
- Order: Coleoptera
- Suborder: Polyphaga
- Infraorder: Cucujiformia
- Family: Curculionidae
- Genus: Gnathotrichus
- Species: G. pilosus

Binomial name
- Gnathotrichus pilosus (LeConte, 1868)

Species of beetle

Gnathotrichus pilosus is a species of ambrosia beetle in the family Curculionidae. It is found in North America.
