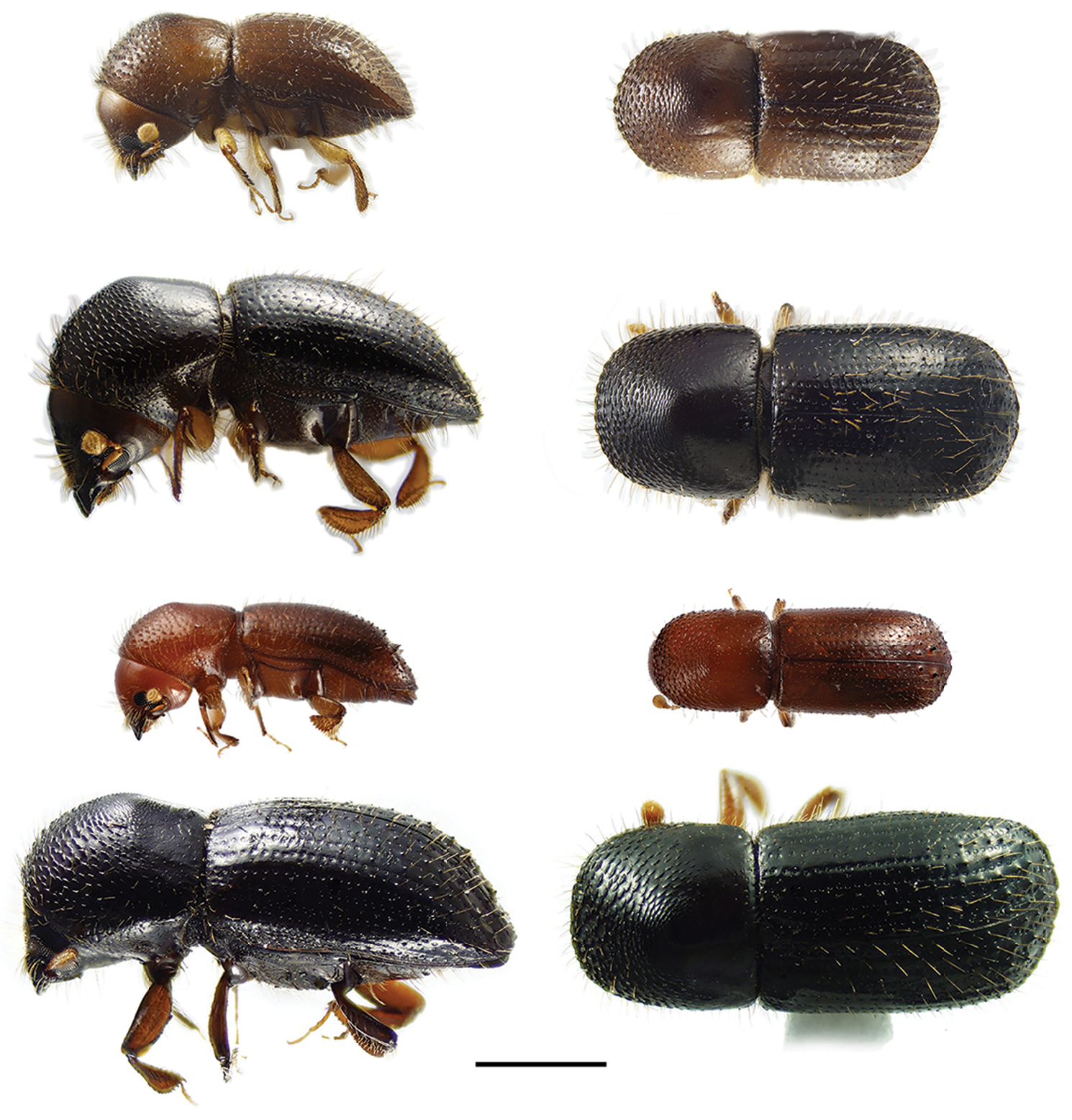
- Lateral and dorsal views of Euwallacea species. From top left, Euwallacea fornicatus, E. interjectus, E. similis and E. validus. Scale bar: 1.0 mm.

Scientific classification
- Kingdom: Animalia
- Phylum: Arthropoda
- Clade: Pancrustacea
- Class: Insecta
- Order: Coleoptera
- Suborder: Polyphaga
- Infraorder: Cucujiformia
- Superfamily: Curculionoidea
- Family: Curculionidae
- Genus: Euwallacea
- Species: E. similis

Binomial name
- Euwallacea similis (Schedl, 1953)

Synonyms
- Xyleborus similis Ferrari, 1867; Tomicus perforans Wollaston, 1857; Bostrichus testaceus Walker, 1859; Xyleborus duponti Montrouzier, 1861; Wallacellus similis (Ferrari): Hulcr and Cognato, 2010; Bostrichus ferrugineus Bohemann, 1859; Xyleborus parvulus Eichhoff, 1868; Xyleborus dilatatus Eichhoff, 1878; Xyleborus submarginatus Blandford, 1896; Xyleborus bucco Schaufuss, 1897; Xyleborus capito Schaufuss, 1897; Xyleborus novaguineanuus Schedl, 1936; Xyleborus dilatatulus Schedl, 1953

= Euwallacea similis =

Species of beetle

Euwallacea similis, is a species of weevil native in the Oriental region through to Australia but shows a cosmopolitan distribution due to introduction to many parts of the world.

== Distribution ==
The native range of the species include: Bangladesh, Bhutan, Cambodia, China, India, Andaman and Nicobar Islands, Indonesia (Java, Maluku Islands, Sulawesi, Sumatra), Laos, Malaysia, Myanmar, Nepal, Pakistan, Philippines, Singapore, Sri Lanka, Taiwan, Thailand, Vietnam, Australia, Papua New Guinea and Solomon Islands.

It is introduced to many African, European and American countries particularly through timber and wood commodities. This exotic range includes: Cameroon, Egypt, Kenya, Mauritania, Mauritius, Seychelles, South Africa, Tanzania, Cocos Islands, Bonin Islands, Jordan, United States, Christmas Island, Micronesia, Fiji, French Polynesia, Guam, Kiribati, Marshall Islands, New Caledonia, Northern Mariana Islands, Palau and Samoa.

== Description ==
Body length of the female ranges from 2.2 to 2.7 mm. Frons convex, and entire surface is minutely reticulate with faint, shallow punctures. Pronotum sides are nearly straight whereas the anterior margin is broadly rounded, and without serrations. Elytral apex is narrowly rounded and the elytral declivity is sloping, and convex. There is a large, distinct tubercle located on lower third in interspace 1. Elytral interspace 7 is acutely elevated, and very weakly crenulate.

== Biology & control ==
A highly polyphagous species, it is known from diverse array of host plants. Due to being a secondary borer, it is considered as a high-risk quarantine pest. They show inbreeding, where the males usually mating with their sisters within the parental gallery system before dispersal. Adults are known to attack small branches and seedlings to large logs as well as stressed, dying, dead or felled trees. It is particularly common in disturbed areas and flies mainly around dusk, and can be attracted to light in large numbers easily. The gallery system consists of branching tunnels in one transverse plane. Brood chambers are not found at the cambial level or within the wood. Eggs are laid, and the larvae develop and pupate within the same gallery system. Both parent female and the larvae feed on the ambrosia fungus such as Ambrosiella which are growing on the walls of the galleries. The fungus is transmitted by the female in a mycangium.

Adults can be controlled by natural predators such as lizards, clerid beetles and ants as they attempt to bore into the host tree. Immature stages are susceptible for both predators and parasitoids.

=== Host plants ===
- Acacia crassicarpa
- Agathis
- Artocarpus integer
- Boswellia serrata
- Bruguiera parviflora
- Camellia sinensis
- Cocos nucifera
- Dipterocarpus baudii
- Dryobalanops aromatica
- Durio zibethinus
- Erythrina subumbrans
- Falcataria moluccana
- Ficus religiosa
- Hevea brasiliensis
- Intsia palembanica
- Mangifera indica
- Manihot glaziovii
- Pometia pinnata
- Pterocarpus indicus
- Rhizophora mucronata
- Rubroshorea leprosula
- Styrax benzoin
- Syzygium cumini
- Tectona grandis
- Terminalia bellirica
- Theobroma cacao
