= Non-human agriculture =

Agriculture among animals besides humans

Agriculture has been developed by animals other than humans; non-human agriculture has most notably evolved within ants, who are known to farm not just plants and fungi, but also animals, both for their resultant products and for their meat directly. Other insects also practice agriculture, such as ambrosia beetles and Macrotermitinae, which both cultivate their own colonies of fungi. Other than insects, longfin damselfish farm opossum shrimp, and it has been proposed that southeastern pocket gophers' burrows, which promote the growth of roots upon which they feed, constitute farms.

Agriculture has developed independently over several groups of insects. Ants are the largest group of agricultural insects and have domesticated plants, animals, and fungi, all of which they tend to as a colony. Termites and beetles both farm fungus, but in different ways. Termites farm fungus as the core function of their large colonies, wherein a permanent fungus garden is kept and tended to (similarly to the fungus growing ants), whereas beetles maintain their own small fungus gardens which they inherit from their parents and pass on to their children with the assistance of symbiotic mites.

== Insects ==
=== Ants ===
==== Plant growing (Philidris nagasau) ants ====
The Fijian ant species Philidris nagasau has been shown to participate in agriculture, collecting the seeds of certain plants and replanting them in specific places. The plants the ants farm are of the Epiphytic genus Squamellaria, meaning they live within other trees without the need for soil. These plants have developed symbiotically with the ants to form domatia, hollow structures in which the ants may reside, and in return the ants cultivate the plants and assist in their survival.

==== Fungus growing (Attine) ants ====
Ants of the tribe Attini, also known as fungus-growing ants, are named as such for the fungus gardens they keep in their colonies. These ants cut and collect plant matter to feed to the fungus, which is in turn fed upon by the ants.

==== Dairying (Camponotus, Myrmica, Weaver) ants ====
Ants of genera Camponotus and Myrmica, as well as Weaver ants have been shown to farm aphids on other plants. Aphids congregate on plant stalks, where they extract and consume plant matter, but some of what they consume they do not absorb, and so they excrete this as honeydew, a sweet substance. The honeydew is desirable to ants, who consume it from the aphids, and provide protection to their "flock" against other insects who would attempt to predate upon the aphids. Beyond providing protection however, some ants will bite off aphid's wings so as to stop them from moving to other plants, as well as releasing certain chemicals to slow down the aphids, limiting their movement. Ants have also been known to consume aphids when populations rise too high, or if the ants need nutrients which the aphids contain.

==== Ranching (Melissotarsus) ants ====
The ants of genus Melissotarsus of Africa are believed to be the only animals to engage in agriculture of other animals strictly for the consumption of the "livestock" as meat. The ants are adapted to create their colonies in bark of trees, going so far as to evolve to have a second pair of inverted legs so the ants can better navigate their tunnels. Their livestock are several species of scale insects, which live within the ant's colonies, and are raised to be consumed.

=== Termites ===
In a similar situation to the fungus growing ants, termites of the subfamily Macrotermitinae farm their own fungi, of the genus Termitomyces. Just as ants do, termites will gather organic matter from outside the nest, then bring it into the mound to be fed to the fungus, which prospers as a result of the warm and humid atmosphere within the termite's mound. One notable difference however, is that while ants eat the fungus directly, the termites eat "Mycotetes", small nutrient rich structures created by the fungus.

=== Beetles ===
Certain weevils of subfamilies Scolytinae and Platypodinae, known as Ambrosia beetles, have developed fungus-based agriculture of their own. A female of these species will burrow into trees, where it will deposit both its own eggs, as well as mites which carry specialized Ambrosia fungi. As the eggs incubate, the fungi will grow over the interior surface of the burrow, consuming the tree and turning it into usable energy and nutrients for the beetles. When the eggs hatch, the young beetles will consume the fungi for energy. Eventually, they will pupate, at which point they then emerge into the world with their own mites and fungi to spread elsewhere to be consumed by their offspring.

== Fish ==
The longfin damselfish has been shown to have developed agriculture of both algae and shrimp, farming both at the same time. It does this by maintaining "herds" of Mysida, which it allows to live on its otherwise fiercely defended patches of algae on reefs. By allowing the Mysids to live on the farms, their feces fertilizes the algae, which is in turn fed upon by the fish. By fertilizing the algae with their feces, the shrimp cause the algae to grow more than they otherwise would, thus making the farms more productive than if the shrimp were not present.

== Mammals ==
It has been proposed that the behavior of the southeastern pocket gopher qualifies as agriculture. The gophers tunnel through soil which occasionally contains some of the plant roots upon which they feed. However, instead of immediately consuming the roots, they use their feces to fertilize the plants, allowing the roots to grow larger before they are consumed by the gophers. By doing this, they are able to increase the yield, meaning that it is possible up to 60% of the gopher's food is collected from within the tunnels, drastically reducing the risk of predation during feeding which would otherwise be faced by leaving the tunnels to forage.

== See also ==
- Agriculture
- Agriculture in ants
- Ant–fungus mutualism
- Aphid#Ant mutualism
- Domestication
- Fungus-growing ants
- Myrmecophyte
