= Sueus niisimai =

Scientific classification
- Kingdom: Animalia
- Phylum: Arthropoda
- Class: Insecta
- Order: Coleoptera
- Suborder: Polyphaga
- Infraorder: Cucujiformia
- Family: Curculionidae
- Genus: Sueus
- Species: S. niisimai

Binomial name
- Sueus niisimai (Eggers, 1926)

Synonyms
- Hyorrhynchus niisimai Eggers, 1926; Hyorrhynchus pilosus Eggers, 1936; Sphaerotrypes controversae Murayama, 1950; Sueus sphaerotrypoides Murayama, 1951

Species of beetle

Sueus niisimai is a species of weevil in the subfamily Scolytinae.

== Distribution ==
Sueus niisimai is widely distributed in South, Southerast, and East Asia. It is also found in Australia and Fiji, presumably introduced. However, a recent study suggests that the southern records represent Sueus pilosus and that Sueus niisimai is more northerly species found from northern Vietnam and China east to Taiwan, Japan, and Korea.

== Description ==
Body length excluding head is about 1.6 to 2.0 mm. Body elongate is oval and slightly flattened. Body reddish brown. Antennae and tarsi yellowish brown. Compound eyes divided into two parts where the upper ones are located almost on frons and lower ones are located behind scrobe ventrally. Pronotum wider than long, shiny with minute shallow punctures. Pronotum clothed with whitish hairy pubescence. Scutellum shiny, small and triangular. Elytra long, parallel-sided, and slightly flattened.

== Biology ==
A polyphagous weevil, the host plants of the adults are mainly broaden leaves trees such as orange, Commersonia bartramia, Cryptocarya constricta and Macaranga. Females generally constructs galleries in old dry twigs. This gallery system consists of a radial gallery, and usually two longitudinal branches running up and down the stem. Eggs are laid in separate niches, where the larvae develop by feeding on the ambrosia fungus growing in the parental gallery. Usually, only one or two males are produced in each gallery with majority of females. Males are smaller than the females, where they mate with their sisters in the parental gallery.

The Canker disease fungus Diatrypella japonica is identified as a symbiote associated with the adult weevils.
