= Euwallacea piceus =

Scientific classification
- Kingdom: Animalia
- Phylum: Arthropoda
- Class: Insecta
- Order: Coleoptera
- Suborder: Polyphaga
- Infraorder: Cucujiformia
- Family: Curculionidae
- Genus: Euwallacea
- Species: E. piceus

Binomial name
- Euwallacea piceus (Motschulsky, 1863)

Synonyms
- Wallacellus piceus (Motschulsky, 1863); Anodius piceus Motschulsky, 1863; Xyleborus indicus Eichhoff, 1878; Xyleborus imitans Eggers, 1927; Xyleborus indicus subcoriaceus Eggers, 1927; Xyleborus samoensis Beeson, 1929

Species of beetle

Euwallacea piceus, is a species of weevil native to Oriental Asia but introduced to African and other Westerns Pacific parts of the world. It is a serious pest in tropical and subtropical parts of the Americas.

== Distribution ==
The native range of the species is Bangladesh, India, Indonesia, Japan, Malaysia, Philippines, Sri Lanka, Taiwan, Vietnam, Australia, Papua New Guinea, and Solomon Islands. The introduced range of the beetle is in African countries: Angola, Cameroon, Democratic Republic of the Congo, Côte d'Ivoire, Equatorial Guinea, Ghana, Guinea, Kenya, Madagascar, Nigeria, Seychelles, South Africa, Tanzania, Uganda, American Samoa, Micronesia, Fiji, New Caledonia, Samoa and Vanuatu.

== Description ==
Adult female has described as follows: average length is about 2.1 to 2.3 mm. Frons convex, shiny and finely reticulate. Frons with large, scattered, deep punctures and scattered, long, erect setae. Pronotal sides are weakly arcuate, and serrations are absent. Elytra longer than pronotum. Elytral apex broadly rounded with unimpressed striae. There are small, shallow punctures on elytra. Elytral interstriae are slightly wider than striae. Elytral declivity is sloping, and weakly convex.

== Biology ==
It is considered as a high-risk quarantine pest. They show inbreeding, with the males generally mating with their sisters within the parental gallery system before dispersal. Attacked plants show signs of wilting, and branch die-back during initial stages, and later resulting shoot breakage, chronic debilitation, and sometimes sun-scorch.

A polyphagous species, it is observed from wide range of host plants. They attack any woody material with abundant moisture content.

=== Host plants ===
- Artocarpus altilis
- Artocarpus heterophyllus
- Castilla elastica
- Celtis mildbraedii
- Diospyros pyrrhocarpa
- Dipterocarpus
- Endospermum diadenum
- Erythrina subumbrans
- Ficus
- Gmelina arborea
- Khaya ivorensis
- Koompassia malaccensis
- Milicia excelsa
- Podocarpus
- Pometia pinnata
- Pterygota alata
- Tectona grandis
- Terminalia ivorensis
- Triplochiton scleroxylon
