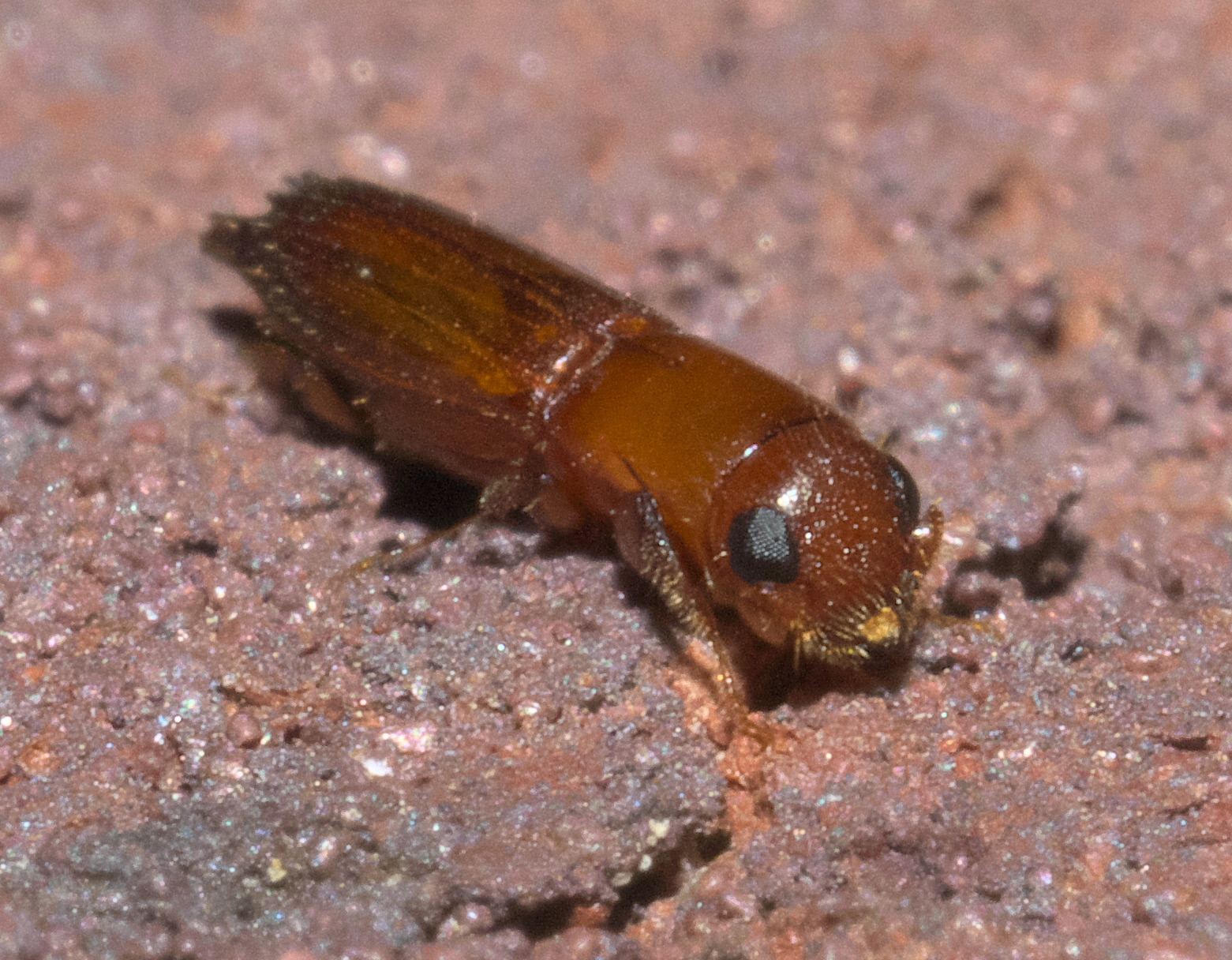
- Euplatypus compositus

Scientific classification
- Kingdom: Animalia
- Phylum: Arthropoda
- Class: Insecta
- Order: Coleoptera
- Suborder: Polyphaga
- Infraorder: Cucujiformia
- Family: Curculionidae
- Subfamily: Platypodinae
- Genus: Euplatypus; Wood, 1993

= Euplatypus =

Genus of beetles

Euplatypus is a genus of pinhole borers in the subfamily Platypodinae of weevils Curculionidae. There are at least 50 described species in Euplatypus.

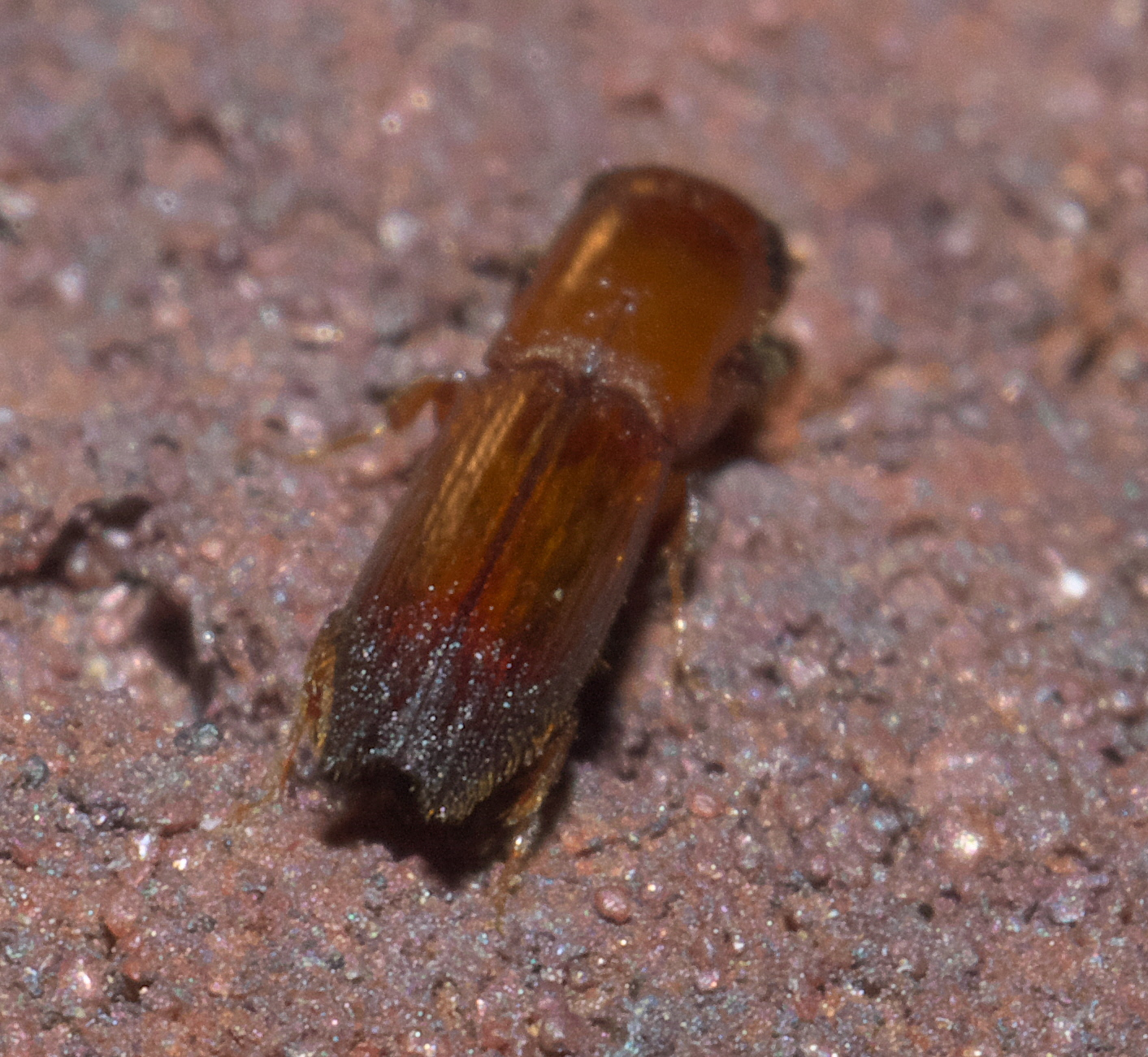
Euplatypus compositus

== Species ==
These 55 species belong to the genus Euplatypus:

- Euplatypus aequalicinctus (Schedl, 1948)^{c}
- Euplatypus alienus (Schedl, 1963)^{c}
- Euplatypus alternans (Chapuis, 1865)^{c}
- Euplatypus angustatulus (Wood, 1966)^{c}
- Euplatypus angustatus (Chapuis, 1865)^{c}
- Euplatypus angustioris (Schedl, 1948)^{c}
- Euplatypus araucariae (Schedl, 1966)^{c}
- Euplatypus areolatus (Chapuis, 1865)^{c}
- Euplatypus bellus (Schedl, 1933)^{c}
- Euplatypus bilobatus (Strohmeyer, 1911)^{c}
- Euplatypus compositus (Say, 1824)^{c b}
- Euplatypus contextus (Schedl, 1963)^{c}
- Euplatypus coronatus (Schedl, 1933)^{c}
- Euplatypus costaricensis (Schedl, 1936)^{c}
- Euplatypus cribricollis (Brandford, 1896)^{c}
- Euplatypus cuspidatus ((Schedl, 1963)^{c}
- Euplatypus decorus (Schedl, 1936)^{c}
- Euplatypus dignatus (Schedl, 1936)^{c}
- Euplatypus dimidiatus (Chapuis, 1865)^{c}
- Euplatypus dissimilis (Chapuis, 1865)^{c}
- Euplatypus dissipabilis (Schedl, 1934)^{c}
- Euplatypus efferatus (Schedl, 1935)^{c}
- Euplatypus haagi (Chapuis, 1865)^{c}
- Euplatypus hians (Chapuis, 1865)^{c}
- Euplatypus hintzi (Schaufuss, 1897)^{c}
- Euplatypus immunis (Schedl, 1959)^{c}
- Euplatypus laminatus (Schedl, 1964)^{c}
- Euplatypus longior (Wood, 1966)^{c}
- Euplatypus longius (Wood, 1966)^{c}
- Euplatypus longulus (Chapuis, 1865)^{c}
- Euplatypus madagascariensis (Chapuis, 1865)^{c}
- Euplatypus minusculus (Schedl, 1936)^{c}
- Euplatypus mulsanti (Chapuis, 1865)^{c}
- Euplatypus otiosus (Schedl, 1936)^{c}
- Euplatypus parallelus (Fabricius, 1801}^{c b}
- Euplatypus patulus (Chapuis, 1865)^{c}
- Euplatypus permimicus (Schedl, 1936)^{c}
- Euplatypus pertusus (Chapuis, 1865)^{c}
- Euplatypus pini (Hopkins, 1905)^{c b}
- Euplatypus porosus (Blandford, 1896)^{c}
- Euplatypus pseudolongulus (Schedl, 1936)^{c}
- Euplatypus pulicaris (Chapuis, 1865)^{c}
- Euplatypus roberti (Chapuis, 1865)^{c}
- Euplatypus rugosifrons (Schedl, 1963)^{c}
- Euplatypus santacruzensis (Mutchler, 1925)^{c}
- Euplatypus segnis (Chapuis, 1865)^{c}
- Euplatypus sinuosus (Chapuis, 1865)^{c}
- Euplatypus solutus (Schedl, 1933)^{c}
- Euplatypus striatus (Chapuis, 1865)^{c}
- Euplatypus tragus (Schedl, 1939)^{c}
- Euplatypus tricuspidatus (Schedl, 1954)^{c}
- Euplatypus trispinatulus (Schedl, 1970)^{c}
- Euplatypus trispinatus (Schedl, 1952)^{c}
- Euplatypus truncatus (Chapuis, 1865)^{c}
- Euplatypus vicinus (Blandford, 1896)^{c}

Data sources: i = ITIS, c = Catalogue of Life, g = GBIF, b = Bugguide.net

Note: Authors of names listed here are as reported in. The "authors" listed in ITIS, GBIF, etc. (cited as "references") are the names of the authors of a recent catalog, not the authors of the taxa.
