= Euwallacea perbrevis =

Scientific classification
- Kingdom: Animalia
- Phylum: Arthropoda
- Clade: Pancrustacea
- Class: Insecta
- Order: Coleoptera
- Suborder: Polyphaga
- Infraorder: Cucujiformia
- Family: Curculionidae
- Genus: Euwallacea
- Species: E. perbrevis

Binomial name
- Euwallacea perbrevis (Schedl, 1951)

Synonyms
- Xyleborus perbrevis Schedl, 1951; Xyleborus fornicatus Eichhoff, 1868; Euwallacea whitfordiodendrus (Schedl, 1942); Xyleborus whitfordiodendrus Schedl, 1942; Xyleborus tapatapaoensis Schedl, 1951

Species of beetle

Euwallacea perbrevis, commonly known as tea shot-hole borer, is a species of weevil native to South and South-East Asia through to Australia, but introduced to Western countries.

== Distribution ==
It is native to American Samoa, Australia, Brunei, China, India, Fiji, Indonesia (Java), Papua New Guinea, Sri Lanka, Japan, Malaysia, Palau, Philippines, Réunion, Singapore, Taiwan, Timor, Vietnam and Thailand. It is also introduced into the United States, Hawaii, Costa Rica, and Panama.

== Description ==
Body length is about 2.3 to 2.5 mm. Elytral length is 1.42 to 1.68 mm. Pronotum length is 1.04 to 1.16 mm. Pronotum with 7 to 10 socketed denticles on the edge of the protibia.

== Biology ==
A polyphagous species, they are recorded from 16 genera in 13 families. It generally inhabits under bark from dead tree, sapwood, tea stems, and large tree fall trunk. The primary branches formed after pruning are more susceptible to attack. Adult females disperse during the day attacking hosts in a range 30–35 m. Females bore a bifurcated or simple tunnel in the twigs or branches. In small plants, one or two branch tunnels are constructed. Egg-laying starts after completing the entrance tunnel. Then the matured female lays eggs singly or in small clusters. This egg production vary with climate and country, where the broods include about 15 to 20 individuals or sometimes 34 individuals.

Number of males in the brood is very low, but they develop more rapidly than females. Males cannot fly and do not normally leave the parental gallery. However, males have observed to emerge and crawl on the surface of the bark. Sometimes, males enter to a gallery and mate with the females in that gallery system. Larvae usually live in the parental galleries. Female larvae pass through three instars. After final instar stage, the larvae pupate together in the tunnels. After emergence, the young females also remain in the galleries for several days. During this period, they undergo inbreeding where they are fertilized by their brothers. Mated females emerge through the original entrance tunnel and fly to new hosts.

New generation emerge about 5 to 6 weeks after the host is infested. The egg, larval and pupal stages of the species lasted about 8 to 10, 21 to 26 and 10 to 12 days, respectively. It feeds on a symbiotic fungus that is cultivated in the xylem of woody plants. Adults generally stored and carry spores of the ambrosia fungus in mycangia. Ambrosia fungus includes: Fusarium bugnicourtii, Fusarium tumidum, Fusarium rekanum, Ceratocystis fimbriata and Graphium.

=== Host plants ===
- Acacia mangium
- Albizia
- Aleurites
- Annona
- Artocarpus altilis
- Avicennia alba
- Brosimum
- Bursera simarouba
- Camellia sinensis
- Casearia disticha
- Cedrela
- Citrus
- Cyathocalyx
- Erythrina
- Falcataria moluccana
- Gmelina arborea
- Litchi sinensis
- Lysiloma
- Mangifera indica
- Myristica castaneifolia
- Protium
- Ricinus communis
- Terminalia myriocarpa
- Theobroma cacao
- Trichospermum
- Xylopia pacifica
