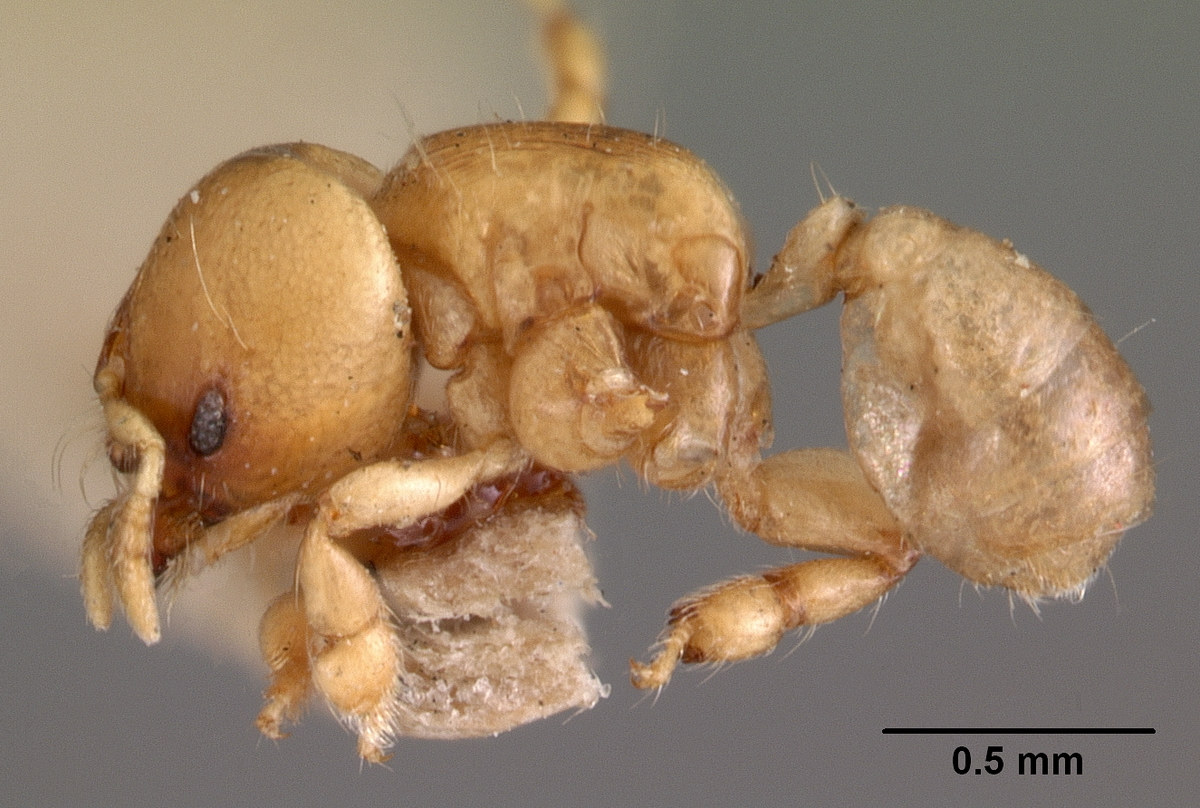
- Melissotarsus beccarii worker

Scientific classification
- Kingdom: Animalia
- Phylum: Arthropoda
- Clade: Pancrustacea
- Class: Insecta
- Order: Hymenoptera
- Family: Formicidae
- Subfamily: Myrmicinae
- Tribe: Crematogastrini
- Alliance: Carebara genus group
- Genus: Melissotarsus; Emery, 1877

Type species
- Melissotarsus beccarii Emery, 1877

Diversity
- 5 species

= Melissotarsus =

Genus of ants

Melissotarsus is a rare African genus of ants in the subfamily Myrmicinae. They are known from the Afrotropics and Malagasy regions, where their nests are located in living wood, built by tunneling through the wood under the bark. They are rarely seen outside of their nests, which may contribute to their perceived rarity. However, they are considered pest insects because of damage they can cause to trees, including economically important ones such as mangos and trees in the family Burseraceae, including Aucoumea klaineana, Dacryodes buettneri, and Dacryodes edulis.

Melissotarsus live in association with armored scale insects, family Diaspididae. A study in Cameroon estimated that a single Dacryodes edulis tree hosted about 1.5 million Melissotarsus beccarii (larvae included) and half a million Diaspis armored scale insects; the densities were about 43 and 15 thousand M. beccarii and Diaspis per square metre bark, respectively. The ants appear to consume the secretions used to manufacture armored scales because Diaspididae are completely naked when ant-attended; the ant nest itself remains completely hidden under the bark of the tree.

== Species ==
=== Extant ===
- Melissotarsus beccarii Emery, 1877
- Melissotarsus emeryi Forel, 1907
- Melissotarsus insularis Santschi, 1911
- Melissotarsus weissi Santschi, 1910

=== Extinct ===
- †Melissotarsus ethiopiensis Coty et al., 2016

== See also ==
- Non-human agriculture
