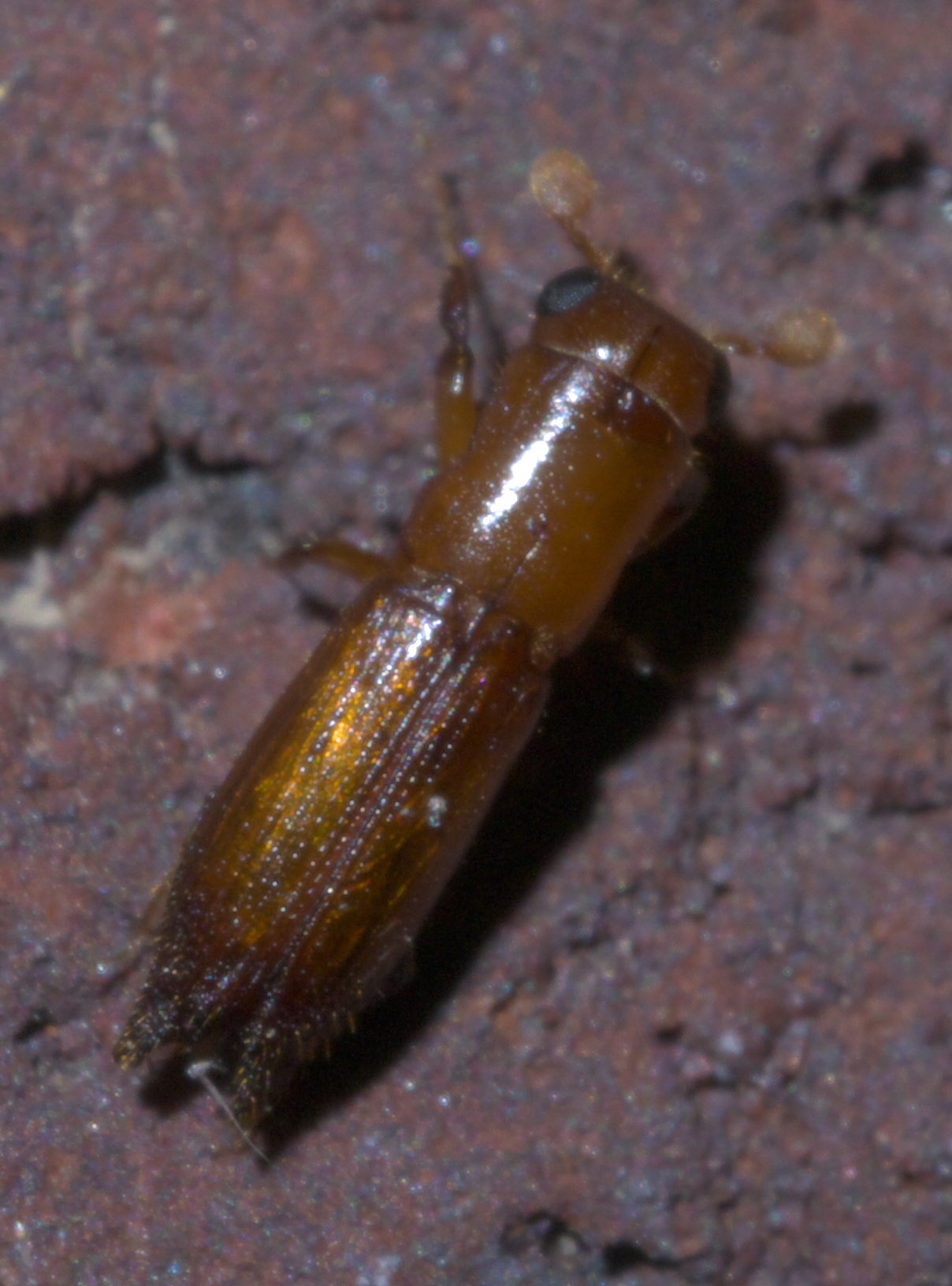

Scientific classification
- Domain: Eukaryota
- Kingdom: Animalia
- Phylum: Arthropoda
- Class: Insecta
- Order: Coleoptera
- Suborder: Polyphaga
- Infraorder: Cucujiformia
- Family: Curculionidae
- Genus: Euplatypus
- Species: E. compositus

Binomial name
- Euplatypus compositus (Say 1824)

= Euplatypus compositus =

Species of beetle

Euplatypus compositus is a species of pinhole borer in the family of beetles known as Curculionidae. It is found in the southeastern United States. The beetle is associated with at least four species of Raffaelea fungi.
