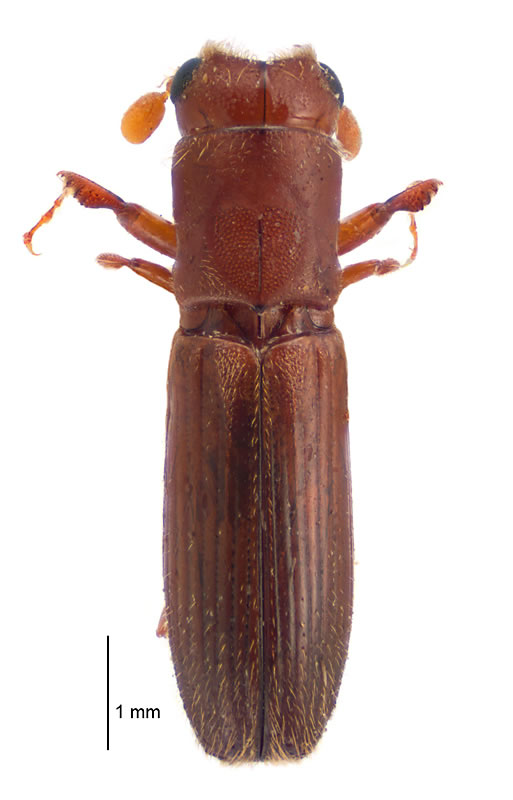
- Treptoplatypus caviceps

Scientific classification
- Kingdom: Animalia
- Phylum: Arthropoda
- Class: Insecta
- Order: Coleoptera
- Suborder: Polyphaga
- Infraorder: Cucujiformia
- Family: Curculionidae
- Subfamily: Platypodinae
- Tribe: Platypodini
- Genus: Treptoplatypus; Schedl, 1972

= Treptoplatypus =

Genus of beetles

Treptoplatypus is a genus of beetles in the beetle family Curculionidae. There are more than 20 described species in Treptoplatypus.

== Species ==
These 23 species belong to the genus Treptoplatypus:

- Treptoplatypus abietis (Wood), 1958
- Treptoplatypus artesolidus Bright & Skidmore, 2002
- Treptoplatypus australis Bright & Skidmore, 2002
- Treptoplatypus biflexuosus Bright & Skidmore, 2002
- Treptoplatypus canaliculatus Bright & Skidmore, 2002
- Treptoplatypus caviceps Bright & Skidmore, 2002
- Treptoplatypus circulicauda Browne, 1949
- Treptoplatypus fischeri Schedl, 1972
- Treptoplatypus franciai Bright & Skidmore, 2002
- Treptoplatypus fulgens Beaver & Liu, 2013
- Treptoplatypus hirtus Bright & Skidmore, 2002
- Treptoplatypus micrurus Bright & Skidmore, 2002
- Treptoplatypus multiporus Schedl, 1968
- Treptoplatypus oxyurus Bright & Skidmore, 2002
- Treptoplatypus pasohensis Bright & Skidmore, 2002
- Treptoplatypus quadriporus Schedl, 1971
- Treptoplatypus sandakanensis Bright & Skidmore, 2002
- Treptoplatypus solidulus Bright & Skidmore, 2002
- Treptoplatypus solidus Bright & Skidmore, 2002
- Treptoplatypus subaplanatus Wood & Bright, 1992
- Treptoplatypus taxicornis Schedl, 1972
- Treptoplatypus trepanatus Schedl, 1939
- Treptoplatypus wilsoni (Swaine), 1916
