= Mycangium =

Body structures adapted for the transport of symbiotic fungi

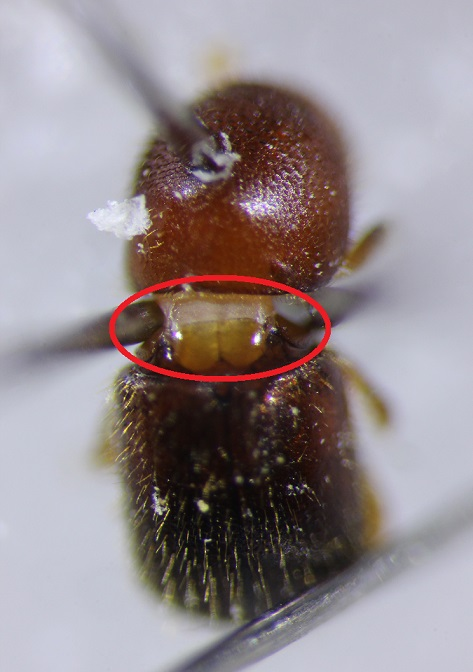
Pronotal mycangia of ambrosia beetle Xylosandrus crassiusculus

The term mycangium (pl., mycangia) is used in biology for special structures on the body of an animal that are adapted for the transport of symbiotic fungi (usually in spore form). This is seen in many xylophagous insects (e.g. horntails and bark beetles), which apparently derive much of their nutrition from the digestion of various fungi that are growing amidst the wood fibers. In some cases, as in ambrosia beetles (Coleoptera: Curculionidae: Scolytinae and Platypodinae), the fungi are the sole food, and the excavations in the wood are simply to make a suitable microenvironment for the fungus to grow. In other cases (e.g., the southern pine beetle, Dendroctonus frontalis), wood tissue is the main food, and fungi weaken the defense response from the host plant.

Some species of phoretic mites that ride on the beetles, have their own type of mycangium, but for historical reasons, mite taxonomists use the term acarinarium. Apart from riding on the beetles, the mites live together with them in their burrows in the wood.

== Origin ==
These structures were first systematically described by Helene Francke-Grosmann at 1956. Then Lekh R. Batra coined the word mycangia: modern Latin, from Greek myco 'fungus' + angeion 'vessel'.

== Function ==
The most common function of mycangia is preserving and releasing symbiotic inoculum. Usually, the symbiotic inoculum in mycangia will benefit their vectors (typically insect or mites), helping them to adapt to the new environment or provide nutrients of the vectors themselves and their descendants.

For example, the ambrosia beetle (Euwallacea fornicatus) carries the symbiotic fungus Fusarium. When the beetle bores a host plant, it releases the symbiotic fungus from its mycangium. The symbiotic fungus becomes a plant pathogen, acting to weaken the resistance of host plant. In the meantime, the fungus grows quickly in the galleries as the main food of beetle. After reproduction, maturing beetles will fill their mycangia with symbiont before hunting for a new host plant.

Therefore, mycangia play an important role in protecting the inoculum from degradation and contamination. The structures of mycangia always resemble a pouch or a container, with caps or a small opening that reduce the possibility of contaminants from outside. How mycangia release their inoculum is still unknown.

== Mycangia and symbiotic inoculum ==
Most of the inoculum in mycangia are fungi. The symbiotic inoculum of most bark and ambrosia beetles are fungi belonging to Ophiostomatales (Ascomycota: Sordariomycetidae) and Microascales (Ascomycota: Hypocreomycetidae). Symbiotic fungi in mycangia of woodwasps are Amylostereaceae (Basidiomycota: Russulales). Symbiotic fungi in mycangia of lizard beetles are yeast (Ascomycota: Saccharomycetales). Symbiotic fungi in mycangia of ship-timber beetles are Endomyces (Ascomycota: Dipodascaceae). Symbiotic fungi in mycangia of leaf-rolling weevils are Penicillium fungi (Ascomycota: Trichocomaceae). In addition to the above primary symbiotic fungi, secondary fungi and some bacteria have been isolated from mycangia.

== Mycangia in insects ==
=== In bark and ambrosia beetles ===
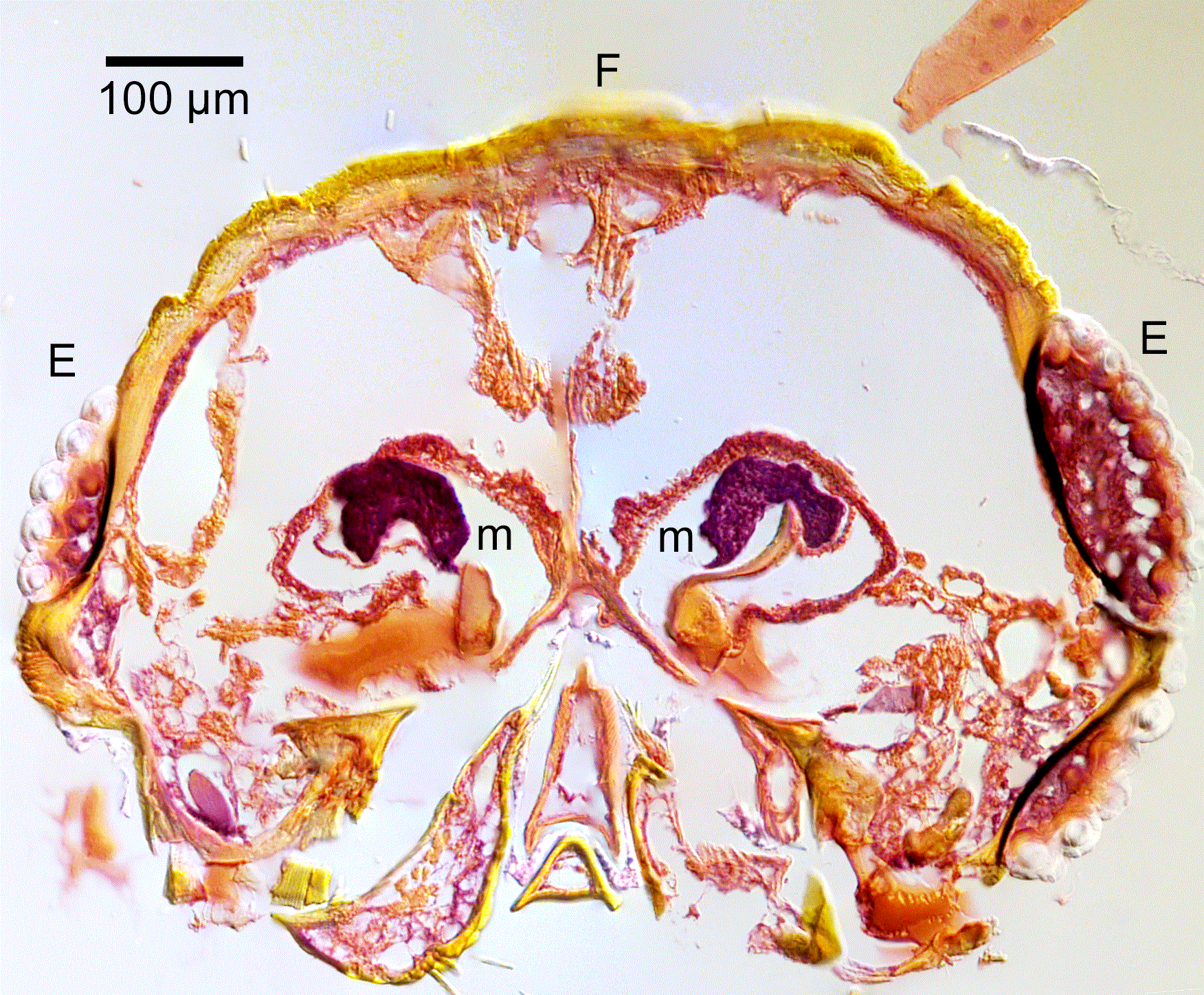
Oral mycangia in ambrosia beetle Ambrosiodmus

Mycangia of bark and ambrosia beetles (Curculionidae: Scolytinae and Platypodinae) are often complex cuticular invaginations for transport of symbiotic fungi. Phloem-feeding bark beetles (Curculionidae: Scolytinae) have usually numerous small pits on the surface of their body, while ambrosia beetles (many Scolytinae and all Platypodinae), which are completely dependent on their fungal symbiont, have deep and complicated pouches. These mycangia are often equipped with glands secreting substances to support fungal spores and perhaps to nourish mycelium during transport. In many cases, the entrance to a mycangium is surrounded by tufts of setae, aiding in scraping mycelium and spores from walls of the tunnels and directing the spores into the mycangium. The mycangia of ambrosia beetle are highly diverse. Different genera or tribes with different kinds of mycangia. Some are oral mycangia in the head, such as genus Ambrosiodmus and Euwallacea. Some are pronotal mycangia, such genus Xylosandrus and Cnestus.

=== In woodwasps (horntails) ===
Mycangia of the woodwasps (Hymenoptera: Siricidae) were first described by Buchner. Different from highly diverse types in bark and ambrosia beetles, woodwasps only have a pair of mycangia on the top of their ovipositor. Then when females deposit their eggs inside the host plant, they inject the symbiotic fungi from mycangia and phytotoxic mucus from another reservoir-like structure.

=== In lizard beetles ===
One species of lizard beetle Doubledaya bucculenta (Coleoptera: Erotylidae: Erotylidae) has mycangia on the tergum of the eighth abdominal segment. This ovipositor-associated mycangia is only present in adult females. Before Doubledaya bucculentnta deposit their eggs and inject the symbiotic microorganisms on a recently dead bamboo, they will excavate a small hole through the bamboo culm.

=== In ship-timber beetles ===
The ship-timber beetle (Coleoptera: Lymexylidae) is another family of wood-boring beetles that live with symbiotic fungi. Buchner first discovered their mycangia located on the ventral side of the long ovipositor. These mycangia form a pair of integumental pouches at either side near the tip of oviduct. When the female lays the eggs, new eggs are coated with the fungal spores.

=== In leaf-rolling weevils ===
Females of the leaf-rolling weevil in the genus Euops (Coleoptera: Attelabidae) store symbiotic fungi in the mycangia, which is between the first ventral segment of the abdomen and the thorax. Different from ovipositor-associate mycangia in woodwasps, lizard beetles, and ship-timber beetles, mycangia of leaf-rolling weevils is a pair of spore incubators at the anterior end of the abdomen. This mycangium is formed by the coxa and the metendosternite at the posterior end of the thorax.

=== In stag beetles ===
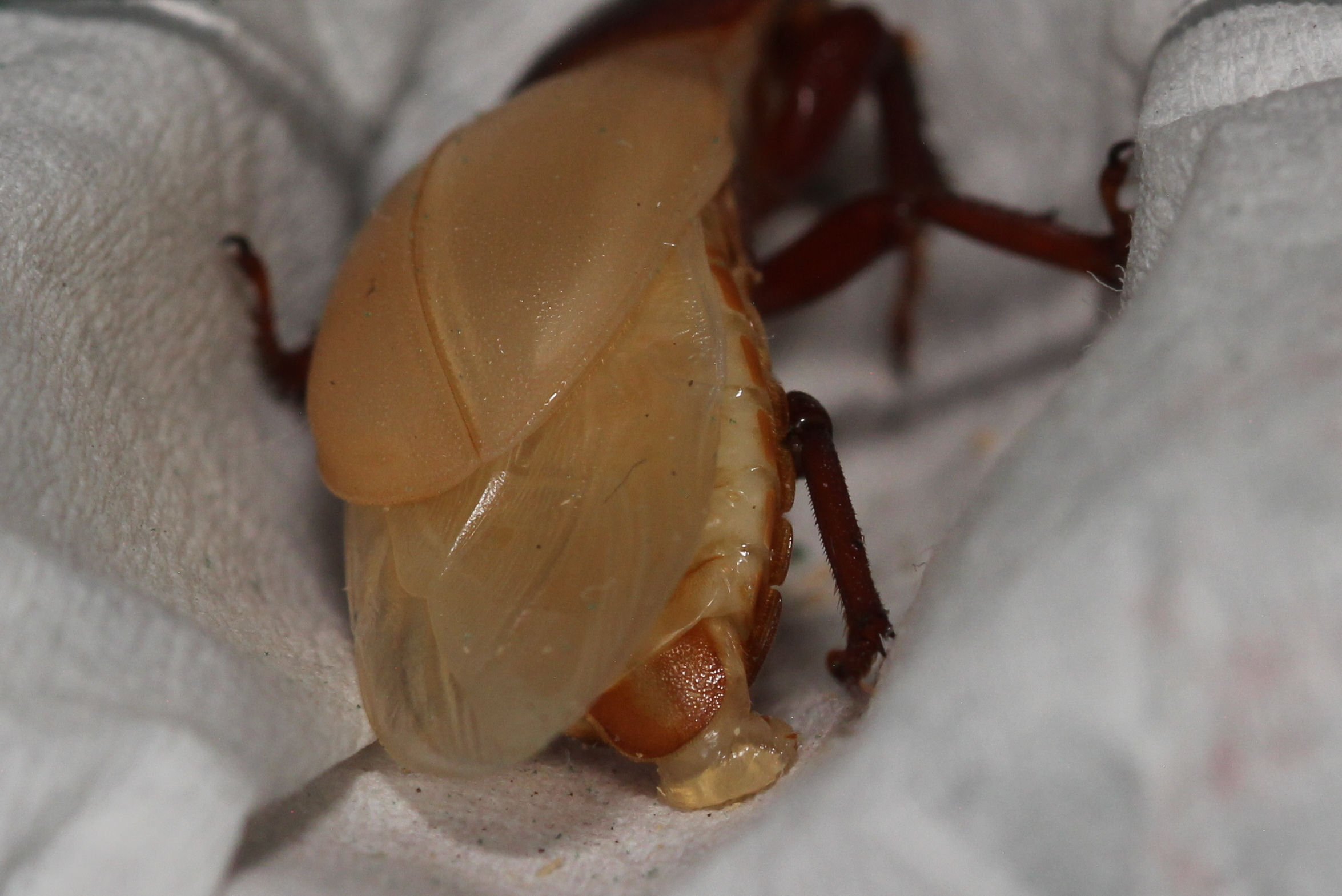
Lesser stag beetle female everting the mycangium soon after eclosion

Mycangia of the stag beetles (Coleoptera: Lucanidae) were discovered in Japan only this century. This ovipositor-associated mycangium is located in a dorsal fold of the integument between the last two tergal plates of the adult females. It has been examined in many species. A female everts the mycangium for the first time soon after eclosion; this is to retrieve the symbionts left by the larva on the pupal chamber when it emptied its gut before pupating. Later, when ovipositing, she everts it to pass on the inoculum to the next generation.

=== In stinkbugs ===
The drab stinkbug, Megymenum gracilicorne, (Hemiptera: Dinidoridae) was found in 2025 to carry Cordyceps and Simplicillium fungii in the hind leg mycangia of females. The fungus is applied to eggs as they are laid, and it serves to protect the eggs from parasitoid wasps.
