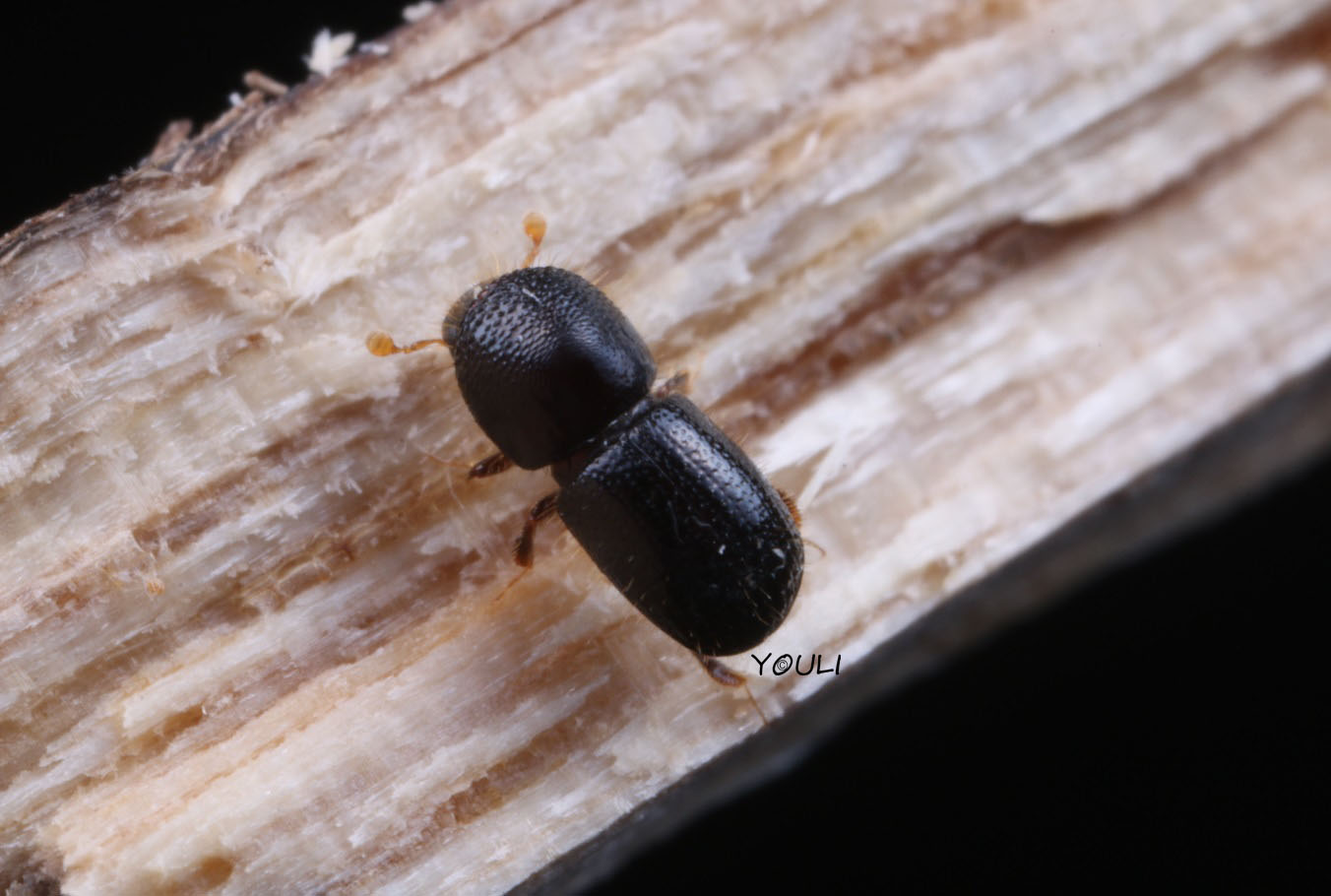
- Adult female of E. fornicatus

Scientific classification
- Kingdom: Animalia
- Phylum: Arthropoda
- Clade: Pancrustacea
- Class: Insecta
- Order: Coleoptera
- Suborder: Polyphaga
- Infraorder: Cucujiformia
- Superfamily: Curculionoidea
- Family: Curculionidae
- Genus: Euwallacea
- Species: E. fornicatus

Binomial name
- Euwallacea fornicatus (Eichhoff, 1868)

Species in the complex
- Tea shot-hole borer clade a Tea shot-hole borer clade b Polyphagous shot-hole borer Kuroshio shot-hole borer

= Euwallacea fornicatus =

Species of beetle

Euwallacea fornicatus, also known as tea shot-hole borer (TSHB) or polyphagous shot-hole borer (PSHB), is a species complex consisting of multiple cryptic species of ambrosia beetles known as an invasive species in California, Israel, South Africa, and Australia. The species has also been unintentionally introduced into exotic greenhouses in several European countries.

== Etymology ==
See Wallacea, region of Indonesian islands named after the naturalist Alfred Russel Wallace.

Common names of the species include tea shot-hole borer and polyphagous shot-hole borer (PSHB).

== History of expansion ==
The tea shot-hole borer has been known to cause devastating damage to tea (Camellia sinensis) in at least ten countries, including India and Sri Lanka where it is a major economic pest.

Since 2007, specimens of E. fornicatus have been documented in Florida on avocado trees. However, it is not considered a health threat because no disease is expressed.

In 2009, specimens matching the description for E. fornicatus were introduced into Israel, where they were documented as vectors of a new fungal plant pathogen in avocado trees. In 2012, similar fungal disease was recorded in avocado trees in California (CA).

The species has also been unintentionally introduced into exotic greenhouses in several European countries.

It was found in South Africa early in 2017.

Polyphagous shot-hole borer was detected in Perth, Western Australia, in 2021.

== Identification ==
=== Adult ===
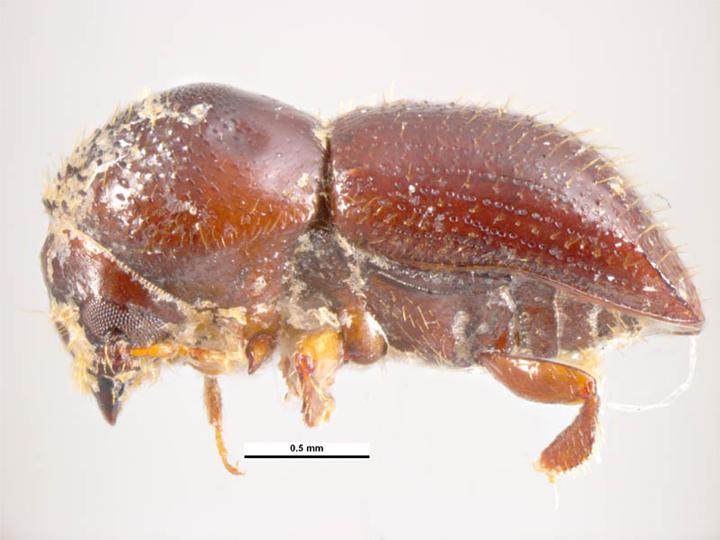
Lateral view of the adult beetle

Adult females can range between 1.9 and 2.5 mm long. They are bulky, dark brown or black and the frontal edge of the pronotum has a row of saw-like projections. Moreover, specimens have erect setae organized in rows in the elytral declivity with a costa in the posterolateral edge. Like many other ambrosia beetles, males are significantly smaller, with non-functional wings.

=== Larvae ===
Larvae are similar to all other larvae in the family Curculionidae; legless, c-shaped and a sclerotized head capsule.

== Taxonomy ==
Euwallacea fornicatus is a species complex consisting of multiple cryptic species of ambrosia beetles (Coleoptera: Curculionidae: Scolytinae: Xyleborini), known as an invasive species in California, Israel, South Africa, and Western Australia.

Even though several taxa were historically synonymized under the name E. fornicatus due to morphological similarity, some of these taxa differ in terms of economic severity and host preferences. As such, Euwallacea fornicatus is typically considered a species complex, with several clades that occur in separate regions of Southeast Asia and develop in different hosts. Early phylogenetic work using the DNA mitochondrial gene COI suggested that there were three major clades classified as E. fornicatus, supporting the idea of at least three different species with phylogeographic boundaries within the species complex. Later work (in 2018) resolved that there were actually four major lineages, one containing "true" E. fornicatus, another bearing the resurrected name Euwallacea fornicatior, another bearing the resurrected name Euwallacea whitfordiodendrus, and another that had not been named previously, and newly described as Euwallacea kuroshio.

The first two clades, both commonly called the tea shot hole borer, are E. fornicatus and E. fornicatior; these are originally from southern Southeast Asia and introduced into Hawaii and Florida. The third clade is thought to originate from a more northern range in Southeast Asia and to have since been introduced into Los Angeles, California, Israel and South Africa. This clade has been given the common name polyphagous shot hole borer in reference to the very broad host range, and contains E. whitfordiodendrus. It has been severely affecting avocado trees in association with several Fusarium species. The fourth clade, the Kuroshio shot hole borer, is believed to have originated in the Pacific Islands and has since been introduced into San Diego county, California, and contains E. kuroshio. It has impacted many trees in San Diego County, as far south as the Tijuana River Valley Regional Park.

A fundamental problem remains that the morphological variation within the species of each clade is great enough that there is no character or even combination of characters that can be uniquely used for reliable visual identification of the different taxa; however, their DNA sequences differ by 11–15%, and appear to be far more reliable for identification. Given that research until 2018 has generally assumed a single species was being studied, it is hoped that DNA analyses can now be applied to specimens from earlier studies to identify, post facto, which actual species were being examined, so as to better understand the biology of the different lineages.

== Hosts ==
These beetles are able to reproduce in a number of tree species, including box elder, avocado, castor bean, English oak, coast live oak, silk tree, sweetgum, coral tree, Tītoki, California sycamore, Blue Palo Verde and big leaf maple.

Similarly to other ambrosia beetles, E. fornicatus larvae and adults do not consume the wood itself, but instead feed on a symbiotic fungus (Fusarium euwallaceae) carried in a specific structure called mycangium. In E. fornicatus, the mycangium is located in the mandible. The combination of massive numbers of beetles with the symbiotic fungus kills trees, even though the fungus alone is a weak pathogen.

== Status and management ==
Euwallacea fornicatus breeds in various live hosts and is considered a severe pest of several economically important plants, such as: tea (Camellia sinensis), avocado (Persea americana), citrus (Citrus spp.), and cacao (Theobroma cacao). The beetle damages the tree by tunnelling deeply, and cultivating fungus which blocks the vascular system of the tree, thus depriving it of the ability to transport water and nutrients to its branches and leaves.

The most recommended management strategies include sanitation of infected hosts and avoiding the spread of infected material. Chemical control can be considered in hosts which are not part of human consumption and some attempts of biological control have been made with little success. Moreover, resistant or tolerant varieties are considered an important aspect of the integrated pest management for this pest.

After its introduction to South Africa, a 2022 Stellenbosch University study estimated that the potential economic harm of the pest to be around 18.45 billion international dollars (A$28 billion), or about 0.66% of the South Africa's GDP.

The PHSB was first detected in Perth, Australia, in 2021, in two box elder maple trees in East Fremantle. By 2024 the beetle was entrenched in metropolitan parks in Perth such as Hyde Park and, as of March 2024, scientists were working hard to eradicate it and prevent its movement to the eastern seaboard of the continent. The only way to kill an infestation of the pest is to remove and grind up the affected wood into woodchips, which in most cases requires cutting down entire mature trees. Several large Moreton Bay fig trees had to be cut down, and a 300-year-old paperbark tree was marked for removal, among others. In 2024, a quarantine zone had been declared, with plant material not allowed to be taken out of this zone. In June 2025 the Western Australian government stated that eradication was likely not possible. The TSHB is known to be present in north-eastern Australia.

== See also ==
- Ambrosia beetle
- Forest pathology
- Laurel wilt disease
- Scolytus rugulosus, aka shot-hole borer, fruit tree bark beetle, or apple tree beetle
- Xyleborus glabratus
