= Ambrosia fungi =

Ambrosia fungi are fungal symbionts of ambrosia beetles including the polyphagous and Kuroshio shot hole borers.

There are a few dozen species described ambrosia fungi, currently placed in polyphyletic genera Ambrosiella, Raffaelea and Dryadomyces (all from Ophiostomatales, Ascomycota). Probably many more species remain to be discovered. Little is known about ecology of ambrosia fungi, as well as about their specificity to ambrosia beetle species. Ambrosia fungi are thought to be dependent on transport and inoculation provided by their beetle symbionts, as they have not been found in any other habitat. All ambrosia fungi are probably asexual and clonal.

The members of the Euwallacea fornicatus species have a promiscuous mutualism with Ambrosia fungi in Taiwan. There was an investigation done on Euwallacea fornicatus which brought to light how there were symbioses with AFC- ambriosal Fusaria clade. The variety of Ambriosa fungi utilized by Euwallacea fornicatus shows how their relationship is promiscuous in native areas.

== See also ==
- Non-human agriculture
