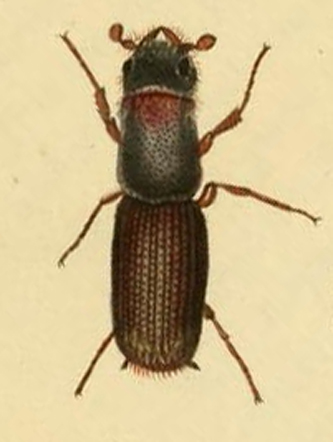
- Platypus cylindrus

Scientific classification
- Kingdom: Animalia
- Phylum: Arthropoda
- Clade: Pancrustacea
- Class: Insecta
- Order: Coleoptera
- Suborder: Polyphaga
- Infraorder: Cucujiformia
- Superfamily: Curculionoidea
- Family: Curculionidae
- Subfamily: Platypodinae; Shuckard, 1840

Tribes
- Mecopelmini; Platypodini; Schedlariini; Tesserocerini

= Platypodinae =

Subfamily of beetles

Platypodinae is a weevil subfamily in the family Curculionidae. They are important early decomposers of dead woody plant material in wet tropics; all but two species are ambrosia beetles that cultivate fungi in tunnels excavated in dead wood as the sole food for their larvae. They are sometimes known as pinhole borers.

== Genera ==
Tribus: Mecopelmini

- Mecopelmus

Tribus: Platypodini

- Austroplatypus – Baiocis – Carchesiopygus – Costaroplatus – Crossotarsus – Cylindropalpus – Dendroplatypus – Dinoplatypus – Doliopygus – Epiplatypus – Euplatypus – Megaplatypus – Mesoplatypus – Myoplatypus – Neotrachyostus – Oxoplatypus – Pereioplatypus – Peroplatypus – Platyphysus – Platypus – Teloplatypus – Trachyostus – Treptoplatypus – Triozastus

Tribus: Schedlariini

- Schedlarius

Tribus: Tesserocerini

- Diapodina - Tesserocerina

== See also ==
- Ambrosia beetle
- Non-human agriculture
