= Aurivillialepas falcata =

Scientific classification
- Kingdom: Animalia
- Phylum: Arthropoda
- Clade: Pancrustacea
- Class: Thecostraca
- Subclass: Cirripedia
- Order: Calanticomorpha
- Family: Calanticidae
- Genus: Aurivillialepas
- Species: A. falcata

Binomial name
- Aurivillialepas falcata (Aurivillius, 1898)

Synonyms
- Scalpellum falcata Scillaelepas falcata

Species of barnacle

Aurivillialepas falcata is a species of barnacle in the Calanticidae family. It was described by the Swedish biologist Carl Wilhelm Samuel Aurivillius in 1898.

A. falcata inhabits in the northeastern Atlantic Ocean near Macronesia. Its range extends from the Azores to the Canary Islands. It is found at depths ranging from 170m to 1030m below sea level. It attaches itself to solid objects including gravel and corals.

A. falcata is hemaphroditic. Complemental males (smaller, exclusively male barnacles) are often found between the rostum and subrostum of the larger hermaphroditic individuals.
