= List of Xyleborus species =

This is a list of 1496 species in Xyleborus, a genus of typical bark beetles in the family Curculionidae.

== Xyleborus species ==
=== A ===
- Xyleborus abberrans Schedl, 1959a^{c}
- Xyleborus abbreviata Schedl, 1942a^{c}
- Xyleborus abbreviatipennis Schedl, 1973e^{c}
- Xyleborus abnormis Eichhoff, 1869b^{c}
- Xyleborus abruptoides Schedl, 1955b^{c}
- Xyleborus abruptulus Schedl, 1953f^{c}
- Xyleborus abruptus Eggers, 1923a^{c}
- Xyleborus abscissus Browne, 1974b^{c}
- Xyleborus acanthodes Schedl, 1954e^{c}
- Xyleborus acanthurus Wood & Bright, 1992^{c}
- Xyleborus acanthus Schedl, 1952i^{c}
- Xyleborus accomodatus Schedl, 1966f^{c}
- Xyleborus aceris Kurenzov, 1941a^{c}
- Xyleborus aclinis Wood, 1974a^{c}
- Xyleborus acuminatus Schedl, 1970e^{c}
- Xyleborus acuticornis Schedl, 1957d^{c}
- Xyleborus acutus Schedl, 1975f^{c}
- Xyleborus adamsoni Beeson, 1935a^{c}
- Xyleborus addendus Schedl, 1964e^{c}
- Xyleborus adelographus Eichhoff, 1868a^{c}
- Xyleborus adjunctus Eggers, 1924^{c}
- Xyleborus adossuarius Schedl, 1952b^{c}
- Xyleborus adspersus Schedl, 1958k^{c}
- Xyleborus adumbratus Blandford, 1894d^{c}
- Xyleborus adunculus Schedl, 1961e^{c}
- Xyleborus aduncus Schedl, 1961e^{c}
- Xyleborus adusticollis Wood & Bright, 1992^{c}
- Xyleborus adustus Eggers, 1923a^{c}
- Xyleborus aegir Eggers, 1922b^{c}
- Xyleborus aequalis Wood & Bright, 1992^{c}
- Xyleborus aequatorensis Eggers, 1940b^{c}
- Xyleborus aesculi Ferrari, 1867a^{c}
- Xyleborus affinis Eichhoff, 1868^{i c b} (sugarcane shot-hole borer)
- Xyleborus africanus Eggers, 1927a^{c}
- Xyleborus agamus Perkins, 1900^{i c}
- Xyleborus agathis Browne, 1984b^{c}
- Xyleborus aglaiae Browne, 1984a^{c}
- Xyleborus agnaticeps Schedl, 1957d^{c}
- Xyleborus agnatus Eggers, 1923a^{c}
- Xyleborus agraphus Schedl, 1977f^{c}
- Xyleborus albizzianus Schedl, 1950d^{c}
- Xyleborus algidus Schedl, 1979b^{c}
- Xyleborus alienus Schedl, 1977c^{c}
- Xyleborus allecta Schedl, 1942d^{c}
- Xyleborus alluaudi Schaufuss, C.F.C., 1897a^{c}
- Xyleborus alni Niisima, 1909^{c}
- Xyleborus alpha Beeson, 1929^{c}
- Xyleborus alpinus Schedl, 1957d^{c}
- Xyleborus alsapanicus Schedl, 1951i^{c}
- Xyleborus alter Eggers, 1931a^{c}
- Xyleborus alternans Eichhoff, 1869a^{c}
- Xyleborus altilis Schedl, 1966f^{c}
- Xyleborus amanicus Hagedorn, 1910b^{c}
- Xyleborus amarantum Schedl, 1942a^{c}
- Xyleborus ambasinotatus Schedl, 1978c^{c}
- Xyleborus ambasipennis Schedl, 1957d^{c}
- Xyleborus ambasius Hagedorn, 1912a^{c}
- Xyleborus ambasiusculus Eggers, 1920^{c}
- Xyleborus amoenus Schedl, 1948f^{c}
- Xyleborus amorphus Eggers, 1926b^{c}
- Xyleborus amphicauda Browne, 1986c^{c}
- Xyleborus amphicranoides Hagedorn, 1908^{c}
- Xyleborus amphicranulus Eggers, 1923a^{c}
- Xyleborus amplexicauda Hagedorn, 1910b^{c}
- Xyleborus amplicollis Eichhoff, 1869a^{c}
- Xyleborus amputatus Blandford, 1894c^{c}
- Xyleborus analis Schedl, 1973e^{c}
- Xyleborus analogus Schedl, 1948f^{c}
- Xyleborus andamanensis Blandford, 1896b^{c}
- Xyleborus andrewesi Blandford, 1896b^{c}
- Xyleborus andriani Schedl, 1965c^{c}
- Xyleborus anepotulus Eggers, 1940d^{c}
- Xyleborus angolensis Schedl, 1959p^{c}
- Xyleborus angustatulus Schedl, 1942d^{c}
- Xyleborus angustatus Eichhoff, 1866^{c}
- Xyleborus angustior Eggers, 1925^{c}
- Xyleborus anisandrus Schedl, 1954b^{c}
- Xyleborus anisopterae Browne, 1983a^{c}
- Xyleborus ankius Schedl, 1975f^{c}
- Xyleborus annectens Schedl, 1957d^{c}
- Xyleborus annexus Schedl, 1973e^{c}
- Xyleborus anomalus Schedl, 1955b^{c}
- Xyleborus anoplum Schedl, 1975f^{c}
- Xyleborus antaisaka Schedl, 1953d^{c}
- Xyleborus antanala Schedl, 1953d^{c}
- Xyleborus apertus Schedl, 1939e^{c}
- Xyleborus apicalis Blandford, 1894d^{c}
- Xyleborus apicenotatus Schedl, 1971c^{c}
- Xyleborus apicipenne Schedl, 1974d^{c}
- Xyleborus apiculatus Schedl, 1942a^{c}
- Xyleborus aplanatideclivis Schedl, 1942c^{c}
- Xyleborus aplanatus Wichmann, H.E., 1914a^{c}
- Xyleborus approximatus Schedl, 1951i^{c}
- Xyleborus aquilus Blandford, 1894d^{c}
- Xyleborus araguensis Wood, 2007^{c}
- Xyleborus araujiae Brèthes, 1921b^{c}
- Xyleborus arbuti Hopkins, 1915b^{c}
- Xyleborus arcticollis Blandford, 1896b^{c}
- Xyleborus arcturus Samuelson, 1981^{i c}
- Xyleborus arduus Schedl, 1942a^{c}
- Xyleborus argentinensis Schedl, 1931c^{c}
- Xyleborus aries Schedl, 1969b^{c}
- Xyleborus armaticeps Schedl, 1942a^{c}
- Xyleborus armatus Schaufuss, C.F.C., 1891^{c}
- Xyleborus armifer Schedl, 1942c^{c}
- Xyleborus armiger Schedl, 1953e^{c}
- Xyleborus armillatus Schedl, 1933d^{c}
- Xyleborus arquatus Sampson, 1912^{c}
- Xyleborus artecomans Schedl, 1953e^{c}
- Xyleborus artecuneolus Schedl, 1939n^{c}
- Xyleborus artecylindrus Schedl, 1942a^{c}
- Xyleborus artegranulatus Schedl, 1937b^{c}
- Xyleborus artegrapha Schedl, 1942d^{c}
- Xyleborus artehybridus Schedl, 1951i^{c}
- Xyleborus artelaevis Schedl, 1942a^{c}
- Xyleborus artelineatus Beeson, 1929^{c}
- Xyleborus artelongus Schedl, 1957d^{c}
- Xyleborus artemarginatus Schedl, 1975a^{c}
- Xyleborus artespinulosus Schedl, 1935d^{c}
- Xyleborus artestriatus Eichhoff, 1878b^{c}
- Xyleborus artetenuis Schedl, 1973a^{c}
- Xyleborus artifex Schedl, 1942d^{c}
- Xyleborus ashuensis Murayama, 1954b^{c}
- Xyleborus asper Eggers, 1933b^{c}
- Xyleborus asperatus Blandford, 1895a^{c}
- Xyleborus aspericauda Eggers, 1941a^{c}
- Xyleborus asperipennis Eggers, 1934b^{c}
- Xyleborus asperipunctatus Eggers, 1933b^{c}
- Xyleborus asperrimus Schedl, 1975a^{c}
- Xyleborus aspersus Sampson, 1921^{c}
- Xyleborus asperulus Eggers, 1931a^{c}
- Xyleborus assamensis Eggers, 1930d^{c}
- Xyleborus assiduus Schedl, 1961i^{c}
- Xyleborus assimilis Eggers, 1927b^{c}
- Xyleborus associatus Schedl, 1976a^{c}
- Xyleborus astutus Schedl, 1954a^{c}
- Xyleborus atava Schedl, 1979g^{c}
- Xyleborus ater Eggers, 1923a^{c}
- Xyleborus aterrimus Eggers, 1927b^{c}
- Xyleborus atlanticus Bright & Torres, 2006^{c}
- Xyleborus atratus Eichhoff, 1875^{c}
- Xyleborus attenuatus Blandford, 1894d^{c}
- Xyleborus auratus Eggers, 1923a^{c}
- Xyleborus aurilegulus Schaufuss, C.F.C., 1897b^{c}
- Xyleborus australis Schedl, 1980b^{c}

=== B ===
- Xyleborus baculum Beeson, 1929^{c}
- Xyleborus badius Eichhoff, 1869a^{c}
- Xyleborus balanocarpi Nunberg, 1961b^{c}
- Xyleborus balbalanus Eggers, 1927c^{c}
- Xyleborus bambesanus Eggers, 1940c^{c}
- Xyleborus banjoewangi Schedl, 1939f^{c}
- Xyleborus banksiae Schedl, 1964d^{c}
- Xyleborus barbatogranosus Schedl, 1942d^{c}
- Xyleborus barbatoides Schedl, 1971c^{c}
- Xyleborus barbatulus Schedl, 1934d^{c}
- Xyleborus barbatus Hagedorn, 1910b^{c}
- Xyleborus barumbuensis Eggers, 1924^{c}
- Xyleborus basalis Schedl, 1972e^{c}
- Xyleborus batoensis Eggers, 1923a^{c}
- Xyleborus beckeri Bright, 1972d^{c}
- Xyleborus bella Sampson, 1921^{c}
- Xyleborus benguetensis Schedl, 1951i^{c}
- Xyleborus betsileo Schedl, 1965c^{c}
- Xyleborus bezanozano Schedl, 1961e^{c}
- Xyleborus bicinctulus Schedl, 1974f^{c}
- Xyleborus bicinctum Schedl, 1965c^{c}
- Xyleborus bicinctus Schedl, 1972g^{c}
- Xyleborus bicolor Blandford, 1894d^{c}
- Xyleborus biconicus Eggers, 1928c^{c}
- Xyleborus bicornatulus Wood, 1967c^{c}
- Xyleborus bicornioides Schedl, 1952b^{c}
- Xyleborus bicornis Eggers, 1923a^{c}
- Xyleborus bicornutus Wood, 1974a^{c}
- Xyleborus bicostatus Sampson, 1921^{c}
- Xyleborus bicuspis Eggers, 1940d^{c}
- Xyleborus bidentatus Wood & Bright, 1992^{c}
- Xyleborus bimaculatus Eggers, 1927c^{c}
- Xyleborus biographus LeConte, 1868^{c}
- Xyleborus birmanus Eggers, 1930d^{c}
- Xyleborus biseriatus Schedl, 1963d^{c}
- Xyleborus bismarcensis Browne, 1966^{c}
- Xyleborus bispinatus Eichhoff, 1868c^{c b}
- Xyleborus bispinosulus Schedl, 1961c^{c}
- Xyleborus bispinus Nobuchi, 1981d^{c}
- Xyleborus bituberculatum Eggers, 1923a^{c}
- Xyleborus biuncus Browne, 1984d^{c}
- Xyleborus blandus Schedl, 1954c^{c}
- Xyleborus bobiriae Schedl, 1957e^{c}
- Xyleborus bodoanus Reitter, 1913a^{c}
- Xyleborus boeni Schedl, 1953d^{c}
- Xyleborus bolivianus Eggers, 1943a^{c}
- Xyleborus borneensis Eggers, 1927c^{c}
- Xyleborus bostrichoides Schedl, 1956a^{c}
- Xyleborus brasiliensis Eggers, 1928c^{c}
- Xyleborus brevicollis Browne, 1984d^{c}
- Xyleborus brevidentatus Eggers, 1930d^{c}
- Xyleborus brevipennis Schedl, 1971c^{c}
- Xyleborus brevipilosus Eggers, 1940d^{c}
- Xyleborus brevis Eichhoff, 1877a^{c}
- Xyleborus brevius Eggers, 1923a^{c}
- Xyleborus breviusculus Schedl, 1942a^{c}
- Xyleborus brighti Schedl, 1974f^{c}
- Xyleborus brownei Schedl, 1964k^{c}
- Xyleborus brunneipes Eggers, 1940d^{c}
- Xyleborus brunneus Browne, 1981b^{c}
- Xyleborus bryanti Sampson, 1919^{c}
- Xyleborus bucco Schaufuss, C.F.C., 1897a^{c}
- Xyleborus burgdorfi Hopkins, 1915b^{c}
- Xyleborus burmanicus Beeson, 1930^{c}
- Xyleborus buscki Hopkins, 1915b^{c}
- Xyleborus butamali Beeson, 1930^{c}
- Xyleborus buxtoni Beeson, 1929^{c}

=== C ===
- Xyleborus cachani Schedl, 1958j^{c}
- Xyleborus cachoeirinhae Schedl, 1951m^{c}
- Xyleborus cacuminatus Eggers, 1928c^{c}
- Xyleborus caelator Browne, 1955^{c}
- Xyleborus caelebs Blandford, 1898b^{c}
- Xyleborus calamoides Murayama, 1934c^{c}
- Xyleborus caldensis Wood, 2007^{c}
- Xyleborus californicus Wood, 1975^{i c}
- Xyleborus calvus Schedl, 1942a^{c}
- Xyleborus camela Eggers, 1940d^{c}
- Xyleborus camerunus Hagedorn, 1910b^{c}
- Xyleborus camopinus Hagedorn, 1903b^{c}
- Xyleborus camphorae Hagedorn, 1908^{c}
- Xyleborus canadensis Swaine, J.M., 1917^{c}
- Xyleborus canarii Browne, 1984a^{c}
- Xyleborus canarivorus Browne, 1986a^{c}
- Xyleborus cancellatus Eggers, 1936e^{c}
- Xyleborus canus Niisima, 1909^{c}
- Xyleborus capensis Eggers, 1944b^{c}
- Xyleborus capito Schaufuss, C.F.C., 1897a^{c}
- Xyleborus capucinoides Eggers, 1941a^{c}
- Xyleborus capucinus Eichhoff, 1869b^{c}
- Xyleborus caraibicus Eggers, 1941a^{c}
- Xyleborus carbonarius Eggers, 1927a^{c}
- Xyleborus carinensis Eggers, 1923a^{c}
- Xyleborus carinipennis Eichhoff, 1868c^{c}
- Xyleborus carinulatus Eggers, 1920^{c}
- Xyleborus catharinensis Eggers, 1928c^{c}
- Xyleborus catulus Blandford, 1898b^{c}
- Xyleborus caudatus Schedl, 1957d^{c}
- Xyleborus cavatus Browne, 1980c^{c}
- Xyleborus cavuloides Browne, 1984c^{c}
- Xyleborus cavulus Browne, 1974b^{c}
- Xyleborus celsoides Hagedorn, 1908^{c}
- Xyleborus celsus Eichhoff, 1868^{i c b}
- Xyleborus ceramensis Schedl, 1937e^{c}
- Xyleborus cerasi Eggers, 1937b^{c}
- Xyleborus chimbui Schedl, 1973f^{c}
- Xyleborus chrysophylli Eggers, 1930d^{c}
- Xyleborus chujoi Schedl, 1951i^{c}
- Xyleborus ciliatoformis Schedl, 1953f^{c}
- Xyleborus ciliatus Eggers, 1940d^{c}
- Xyleborus cinchonae Veen, H., 1897^{c}
- Xyleborus cinctipennis Schedl, 1980b^{c}
- Xyleborus cinctipes Schedl, 1979g^{c}
- Xyleborus circulicauda Browne, 1974a^{c}
- Xyleborus circumcisulus Schedl, 1954a^{c}
- Xyleborus circumcisum Sampson, 1921^{c}
- Xyleborus circumdentatus Schedl, 1938h^{c}
- Xyleborus circumspinosus Schedl, 1972i^{c}
- Xyleborus citri Beeson, 1930^{c}
- Xyleborus clerodendronae Schedl, 1952i^{c}
- Xyleborus coartatus Sampson, 1921^{c}
- Xyleborus coccotrypoides Eggers, 1943a^{c}
- Xyleborus cofeicola Campos Novaes, 1922^{c}
- Xyleborus coffeae Wurth, T., 1908^{c}
- Xyleborus coffeiceus Schedl, 1951b^{c}
- Xyleborus coffeivorus Weele, H.W. van der, 1910^{c}
- Xyleborus cognatus Blandford, 1896a^{c}
- Xyleborus collaris Eggers, 1923a^{c}
- Xyleborus collarti Eggers, 1932d^{c}
- Xyleborus collis Niisima, 1910a^{c}
- Xyleborus colossus Blandford, 1896b^{c}
- Xyleborus comans Sampson, 1919^{c}
- Xyleborus commixtus Blandford, 1898b^{c}
- Xyleborus compactus Eichhoff, 1875^{c}
- Xyleborus comparabilis Schedl, 1957d^{c}
- Xyleborus comptus Sampson, 1919^{c}
- Xyleborus concentus Wood, 1974a^{c}
- Xyleborus concinnus Beeson, 1930^{c}
- Xyleborus concisus Blandford, 1894d^{c}
- Xyleborus concitatus Schedl, 1969a^{c}
- Xyleborus conditus Schedl, 1971c^{c}
- Xyleborus confinis Eggers, 1923a^{c}
- Xyleborus confluens Schedl, 1966f^{c}
- Xyleborus conformis Schedl (Kollar in), 1962j^{c}
- Xyleborus confusus Eichhoff, 1868a^{c}
- Xyleborus congonus Hagedorn, 1908^{c}
- Xyleborus congruens Schedl, 1966f^{c}
- Xyleborus conidens Eggers, 1936d^{c}
- Xyleborus conifer Hagedorn, 1905^{c}
- Xyleborus conradti Hagedorn, 1910b^{c}
- Xyleborus consimilis Eggers, 1923a^{c}
- Xyleborus consobrinus Eggers, 1932d^{c}
- Xyleborus conspeciens Schedl, 1936i^{c}
- Xyleborus conspectus Schedl, 1964g^{c}
- Xyleborus consularis Schedl, 1955b^{c}
- Xyleborus continentalis Eggers, 1920^{c}
- Xyleborus convexicauda Eggers, 1932d^{c}
- Xyleborus cordatus Hagedorn, 1910b^{c}
- Xyleborus corniculatulus Schedl, 1948f^{c}
- Xyleborus corniculatus Schedl, 1948f^{c}
- Xyleborus cornivorus Murayama, 1950c^{c}
- Xyleborus cornutus Schaufuss, C.F.C., 1891^{c}
- Xyleborus coronatus Eichhoff, 1878b^{c}
- Xyleborus corporaali Eggers, 1923a^{c}
- Xyleborus corpulentus Eggers, 1930d^{c}
- Xyleborus corrugatum Schedl, 1951i^{c}
- Xyleborus corruptus Schedl, 1962j^{c}
- Xyleborus corthyloides Schedl, 1934d^{c}
- Xyleborus costaricensis Blandford, 1898b^{c}
- Xyleborus costatomorphus Schedl, 1950g^{c}
- Xyleborus costipennis Schedl, 1959a^{c}
- Xyleborus costulatus Eggers, 1940d^{c}
- Xyleborus covinus Reitter, 1913a^{c}
- Xyleborus crassitarsus Schedl, 1936j^{c}
- Xyleborus crassus Hagedorn, 1910b^{c}
- Xyleborus crenatus Eggers, 1920^{c}
- Xyleborus crenulatus Eggers, 1920^{c}
- Xyleborus cribratus Eggers, 1940d^{c}
- Xyleborus cribripennis Eggers, 1927a^{c}
- Xyleborus crinitulus Wood, 1974a^{c}
- Xyleborus crinitus Schedl, 1962j^{c}
- Xyleborus cristatuloides Schedl, 1971a^{c}
- Xyleborus cristatus Hagedorn, 1908^{c}
- Xyleborus criticus Schedl, 1950g^{c}
- Xyleborus cruciatus Schedl, 1973e^{c}
- Xyleborus crucifer Hagedorn, 1908^{c}
- Xyleborus cruciferinum Schedl, 1957d^{c}
- Xyleborus cruciforme Schedl, 1957d^{c}
- Xyleborus crucipenne Schedl, 1962j^{c}
- Xyleborus cruralis Schedl, 1975e^{c}
- Xyleborus cryphaloides Schedl, 1942a^{c}
- Xyleborus cryptographus Wood & Bright, 1992^{c}
- Xyleborus cucullatus Blandford, 1894d^{c}
- Xyleborus cuneatus Eichhoff, 1878b^{c}
- Xyleborus cuneidentis Schedl, 1961e^{c}
- Xyleborus cuneiformis Schedl, 1958b^{c}
- Xyleborus cuneipennis Schedl, 1950d^{c}
- Xyleborus cuneolosus Schedl, 1959a^{c}
- Xyleborus cuneolus Eggers, 1927c^{c}
- Xyleborus cupulatus Schedl, 1961e^{c}
- Xyleborus curtidentis Schedl, 1961e^{c}
- Xyleborus curtuloides Eggers, 1941a^{c}
- Xyleborus curtulus Eichhoff, 1869a^{c}
- Xyleborus curtus Eggers, 1928c^{c}
- Xyleborus curvatus Browne, 1986a^{c}
- Xyleborus curvidentis Schedl, 1958b^{c}
- Xyleborus curvipenne Schedl, 1951i^{c}
- Xyleborus cuspidus Schedl, 1975f^{c}
- Xyleborus cyclopus Schedl, 1940b^{c}
- Xyleborus cylindrica Eggers, 1927c^{c}
- Xyleborus cylindriformis Schedl, 1942c^{c}
- Xyleborus cylindripennis Schedl, 1954a^{c}
- Xyleborus cylindromorphus Eggers, 1927c^{c}
- Xyleborus cylindrus Schedl, 1951i^{c}

=== D ===
- Xyleborus dalbergiae Eggers, 1930d^{c}
- Xyleborus daosi Schedl, 1958j^{c}
- Xyleborus darwini Schedl, 1972a^{c}
- Xyleborus dasyurus Browne, 1950b^{c}
- Xyleborus dearmatus Eggers, 1923a^{c}
- Xyleborus decipiens Eggers, 1923a^{c}
- Xyleborus declivigranulatus Schedl, 1936j^{c}
- Xyleborus declivis Eichhoff, 1869a^{c}
- Xyleborus declivispinatus Schedl, 1969b^{c}
- Xyleborus decorus Schedl, 1960i^{c}
- Xyleborus decumans Schedl, 1953c^{c}
- Xyleborus defensus Blandford, 1894d^{c}
- Xyleborus deformatus Browne, 1974a^{c}
- Xyleborus delicatum Schedl, 1955b^{c}
- Xyleborus demissus Wood, 1974a^{c}
- Xyleborus densatus Schedl, 1979g^{c}
- Xyleborus denseseriatus Eggers, 1941b^{c}
- Xyleborus densicornis Schedl, 1957d^{c}
- Xyleborus dentatulus Browne, 1981a^{c}
- Xyleborus dentatus Blandford, 1895a^{c}
- Xyleborus dentellus Schedl, 1953d^{c}
- Xyleborus dentibaris Schedl, 1961e^{c}
- Xyleborus denticulus Mandelshtam & Nikitsky, 2010^{c}
- Xyleborus dentipennis Browne, 1983a^{c}
- Xyleborus deplanatulus Schedl, 1950f^{c}
- Xyleborus deplanatus Eggers, 1933b^{c}
- Xyleborus depressurus Browne, 1985a^{c}
- Xyleborus derelictus Hagedorn, 1910b^{c}
- Xyleborus derupteterminatus Schedl, 1951i^{c}
- Xyleborus deruptulus Schedl, 1942d^{c}
- Xyleborus desertus Schedl, 1971c^{c}
- Xyleborus despectus Schedl, 1975j^{c}
- Xyleborus destrictum Schedl, 1939e^{c}
- Xyleborus destruens Blandford, 1896b^{c}
- Xyleborus detectus Schedl, 1975a^{c}
- Xyleborus detritus Eggers, 1927b^{c}
- Xyleborus devexulus Wood, 1978b^{c}
- Xyleborus devexus Wood, 1977b^{c}
- Xyleborus devius Schedl, 1979g^{c}
- Xyleborus diapiformis Schedl, 1961e^{c}
- Xyleborus dichrous Eichhoff, 1868c^{c}
- Xyleborus difficilis Eggers, 1923a^{c}
- Xyleborus diglyptus Schedl, 1956a^{c}
- Xyleborus dihingensis Schedl, 1951i^{c}
- Xyleborus dilatatiformis Schedl, 1971a^{c}
- Xyleborus dilatatulus Schedl, 1953b^{c}
- Xyleborus dilatatus Eichhoff, 1878b^{c}
- Xyleborus diligens Schedl, 1957d^{c}
- Xyleborus dimidiatus Eggers, 1927b^{c}
- Xyleborus discolor Blandford, 1898a^{c}
- Xyleborus discrepans Schedl, 1950d^{c}
- Xyleborus discretus Eggers, 1933b^{c}
- Xyleborus dispar (Fabricius, 1792)^{c}
- Xyleborus dissidens Wood, 1974a^{c}
- Xyleborus dissimulatus Wood, 1974a^{c}
- Xyleborus distinguendus Eggers, 1930d^{c}
- Xyleborus diversepilosus Eggers, 1941b^{c}
- Xyleborus diversicolor Eggers, 1923a^{c}
- Xyleborus diversipennis Schedl, 1951j^{c}
- Xyleborus diversus Schedl, 1954e^{c}
- Xyleborus docta Schedl, 1975f^{c}
- Xyleborus doliaris Schedl, 1959a^{c}
- Xyleborus dolosus Blandford, 1896b^{c}
- Xyleborus donisthorpi Schedl, 1951i^{c}
- Xyleborus dorsalis Schedl, 1965g^{c}
- Xyleborus dorsosulcatus Beeson, 1930^{c}
- Xyleborus dossuarius Eggers, 1923a^{c}
- Xyleborus dryographus Wood & Bright, 1992^{c g}
- Xyleborus dubiosus Perkins, 1900^{i c}
- Xyleborus dubius Eggers, 1923a^{c}
- Xyleborus duodecimspinatus Schedl, 1936g^{c}
- Xyleborus duplex Browne, 1974a^{c}
- Xyleborus duplicatus Eggers, 1923a^{c}
- Xyleborus duploarmatus Browne, 1962c^{c}
- Xyleborus duponti Montrouzier, 1861^{c}
- Xyleborus duprezi Hoffmann, A., 1936^{c}

=== E-F ===
- Xyleborus ebenus Wood, 1971^{c}
- Xyleborus ebriosus Niisima, 1909^{c}
- Xyleborus eccoptopterus Schedl, 1951k^{c}
- Xyleborus eggersi Beeson, 1930^{c}
- Xyleborus eggersianus Schedl, 1960i^{c}
- Xyleborus eichhoffi Schreiner, 1882^{c}
- Xyleborus eichhoffianus Schedl, 1950h^{c}
- Xyleborus elegans Sampson, 1923b^{c}
- Xyleborus elevatus Eggers, 1931a^{c}
- Xyleborus elongatus Eggers, 1920^{c}
- Xyleborus emarginatus Schedl, 1952k^{c}
- Xyleborus erinacea Eggers, 1927c^{c}
- Xyleborus erygraphus (Ratzeburg, 1837)^{g}
- Xyleborus eucalyptica Schedl, 1938f^{c}
- Xyleborus eugeniae Eggers, 1930d^{c}
- Xyleborus eupatorii Eggers, 1940d^{c}
- Xyleborus eurygraphus Wood & Bright, 1992^{c g}
- Xyleborus exactus Schedl, 1964i^{c}
- Xyleborus exaratus Blandford, 1898b^{c}
- Xyleborus excavatus Hagedorn, 1907b^{c}
- Xyleborus excavus Schedl, 1964g^{c}
- Xyleborus exesus Blandford, 1894d^{c}
- Xyleborus exilis Schedl, 1934e^{c}
- Xyleborus eximius Schedl, 1970b^{c}
- Xyleborus exsculpta Eggers, 1927c^{c}
- Xyleborus exsectus Perkins, 1900^{i c}
- Xyleborus extensa Schedl, 1955b^{c}
- Xyleborus exutus Wood, 1974a^{c}
- Xyleborus fabricii Schedl, 1964k^{c}
- Xyleborus facetus Schedl, 1965f^{c}
- Xyleborus falcarius Schedl, 1942c^{c}
- Xyleborus fallaciosus Schedl, 1957d^{c}
- Xyleborus fallax Eichhoff, 1878b^{c}
- Xyleborus fallaxoides Schedl, 1955b^{c}
- Xyleborus falsus Schedl, 1966f^{c}
- Xyleborus familiaris Schedl, 1965c^{c}
- Xyleborus fastigatus Schedl, 1935b^{c}
- Xyleborus felix Schedl, 1971g^{c}
- Xyleborus femoratus Eggers, 1928c^{c}
- Xyleborus ferinus Schedl, 1936j^{c}
- Xyleborus ferox Blandford, 1898b^{c}
- Xyleborus ferrugineus (Fabricius, 1801)^{i c b}
- Xyleborus festivus Eichhoff, 1875^{c}
- Xyleborus ficus Eggers, 1927a^{c}
- Xyleborus figuratus Schedl, 1959a^{c}
- Xyleborus fijianus Schedl, 1938f^{c}
- Xyleborus filiformis Schedl, 1975f^{c}
- Xyleborus fischeri Hagedorn, 1908^{c}
- Xyleborus fitchi Hopkins, 1915b^{c}
- Xyleborus flavipennis Schedl, 1979g^{c}
- Xyleborus flavopilosus Schedl, 1936g^{c}
- Xyleborus flexiocostatus Schedl, 1942d^{c}
- Xyleborus flohri Schedl, 1972g^{c}
- Xyleborus floridensis Hopkins, 1915b^{c}
- Xyleborus foederatus Schedl, 1963f^{c}
- Xyleborus foersteri Hagedorn, 1910b^{c}
- Xyleborus forcipatus Schedl, 1957d^{c}
- Xyleborus forficatus Schedl, 1957d^{c}
- Xyleborus forficuloides Schedl, 1951j^{c}
- Xyleborus forficulus Eggers, 1922b^{c}
- Xyleborus formosae Wood, 1992a^{c}
- Xyleborus formosanus Eggers, 1930d^{c}
- Xyleborus fornicatior Eggers, 1923a^{c}
- Xyleborus fornicatus Eichhoff, 1868c^{c}
- Xyleborus fouqueti Schedl, 1937f^{c}
- Xyleborus foveicollis Browne, 1950b^{c}
- Xyleborus fragosus Schedl, 1942d^{c}
- Xyleborus fraterculus Schaufuss, C.F.C., 1905^{c}
- Xyleborus fraternus Blandford, 1896b^{c}
- Xyleborus frigidus Blackburn, 1885^{c}
- Xyleborus fukiensis Eggers, 1941b^{c}
- Xyleborus fulgens Schedl, 1975f^{c}
- Xyleborus fuliginosus Eggers, 1923a^{c}
- Xyleborus fulvulus Schedl, 1942d^{c}
- Xyleborus fulvus Murayama, 1936a^{c}
- Xyleborus funebris Schedl, 1976a^{c}
- Xyleborus funereus Lea, 1910^{c}
- Xyleborus funestus Schedl, 1979g^{c}
- Xyleborus fuscatus Eichhoff, 1868a^{c}
- Xyleborus fuscipilosus Eggers, 1940d^{c}
- Xyleborus fusciseriatus Eggers, 1934a^{c}
- Xyleborus fuscobrunneus Eichhoff, 1878b^{c}
- Xyleborus fuscus Eggers, 1923a^{c}
- Xyleborus fuyugei Schedl, 1973f^{c}

=== G-H ===
- Xyleborus galeatus Blandford, 1894d^{c}
- Xyleborus ganshoensis Murayama, 1952a^{c}
- Xyleborus geayi Hagedorn, 1905a^{c}
- Xyleborus geminatus Hagedorn, 1904d^{c}
- Xyleborus gentilis Schedl, 1972g^{c}
- Xyleborus germanus Blandford, 1894d^{c}
- Xyleborus gezei Lepesme, 1942c^{c}
- Xyleborus gibber Schedl, 1961e^{c}
- Xyleborus gilvipes Blandford, 1898b^{c}
- Xyleborus glaber Eggers, 1930d^{c}
- Xyleborus glaberrimus Schedl, 1942c^{c}
- Xyleborus glabratulus Browne, 1983a^{c}
- Xyleborus glabratus Eichhoff, 1877a^{c b} (redbay ambrosia beetle)
- Xyleborus glabripennis Schedl, 1942a^{c}
- Xyleborus glaucus Sampson, 1921^{c}
- Xyleborus globus Blandford, 1896b^{c}
- Xyleborus godmani Blandford, 1898b^{c}
- Xyleborus goloanus Browne, 1974a^{c}
- Xyleborus gorggae Schedl, 1973e^{c}
- Xyleborus gorontalosa Schedl, 1939f^{c}
- Xyleborus gracilicornis Schedl, 1977e^{c}
- Xyleborus gracilipennis Schedl, 1957d^{c}
- Xyleborus gracilis Eichhoff, 1868c^{c}
- Xyleborus granatus Schedl, 1979a^{c}
- Xyleborus grandis Eichhoff, 1869a^{c}
- Xyleborus granicollis LeConte, 1868^{c}
- Xyleborus granifer Eichhoff, 1878b^{c}
- Xyleborus graniger Schedl, 1955b^{c}
- Xyleborus granistriatus Eggers, 1940d^{c}
- Xyleborus granosus Schedl, 1957d^{c}
- Xyleborus granularis Schedl, 1950g^{c}
- Xyleborus granulicauda Eggers, 1931a^{c}
- Xyleborus granulifer Eggers, 1923a^{c}
- Xyleborus granulipennis Eggers, 1930d^{c}
- Xyleborus granulipes Schedl, 1973e^{c}
- Xyleborus granulosus Schedl, 1975f^{c}
- Xyleborus granurus Browne, 1980a^{c}
- Xyleborus gratiosus Schedl, 1975f^{c}
- Xyleborus gratus Schedl, 1964g^{c}
- Xyleborus gravelyi Wichmann, H.E., 1914a^{c}
- Xyleborus gravidus Blandford, 1898a^{c}
- Xyleborus grenadensis Hopkins, 1915b^{c}
- Xyleborus grossmanni Schedl, 1952d^{c}
- Xyleborus grossopunctatus Schedl, 1942d^{c}
- Xyleborus guanajuatensis Dugès, 1887^{c}
- Xyleborus guayanensis Eggers, 1933b^{c}
- Xyleborus guineense Eggers, 1941d^{c}
- Xyleborus gundlachi Eggers, 1931a^{c}
- Xyleborus haberkorni Eggers, 1920^{c}
- Xyleborus haddeni Schedl, 1933e^{c}
- Xyleborus haesitus Schedl, 1976a^{c}
- Xyleborus hagedorni Iglesias, 1914b^{c}
- Xyleborus hagedornianus Schedl, 1952k^{c}
- Xyleborus halli Schedl, 1954c^{c}
- Xyleborus hamatus LeConte, 1874a^{c}
- Xyleborus hashimotoi Browne, 1986a^{c}
- Xyleborus hastatum Schedl, 1942d^{c}
- Xyleborus hatanakai Browne, 1983a^{c}
- Xyleborus hawaiiensis Perkins, 1900^{i c}
- Xyleborus hembebitalei Schedl, 1962j^{c}
- Xyleborus heveae Schedl, 1957d^{c}
- Xyleborus hiiaka Samuelson, 1981^{i c}
- Xyleborus hirsutipennis Schedl, 1961e^{c}
- Xyleborus hirtellus Schedl, 1948f^{c}
- Xyleborus hirtipennis Eggers, 1940d^{c}
- Xyleborus hirtipes Schedl, 1969c^{c}
- Xyleborus hirtum Hagedorn, 1904d^{c}
- Xyleborus hirtuosus Beeson, 1930^{c}
- Xyleborus holtzi Eggers, 1922b^{c}
- Xyleborus hopeae Browne, 1986a^{c}
- Xyleborus hopkinsi Beeson, 1929^{c}
- Xyleborus horridatus Wood, 1967c^{c}
- Xyleborus horridicus Wood, 1967c^{c}
- Xyleborus horridulus Browne, 1961a^{c}
- Xyleborus horridus Eichhoff, 1869^{i c b}
- Xyleborus hova Schedl, 1953d^{c}
- Xyleborus howardi Hopkins, 1915b^{c}
- Xyleborus howdenae Bright, 1973^{c}
- Xyleborus huangi Browne, 1983d^{c}
- Xyleborus hubbardi Hopkins, 1915b^{c}
- Xyleborus hunanensis Browne, 1983d^{c}
- Xyleborus hybridus Eggers, 1927c^{c}
- Xyleborus hystricoides Browne, 1973a^{c}
- Xyleborus hystrix Schedl, 1957d^{c}

=== I ===
- Xyleborus ignobilis Perkins, 1900^{i c}
- Xyleborus iheringi Iglesias, 1914b^{c}
- Xyleborus illepidus Schedl, 1941d^{c}
- Xyleborus illustrius Schedl, 1939f^{c}
- Xyleborus imbellis Blandford, 1898b^{c}
- Xyleborus imitator Schedl, 1976a^{c}
- Xyleborus immaturus Blackburn, 1885^{c}
- Xyleborus immersus Schedl, 1972i^{c}
- Xyleborus immitatrix Schedl, 1975f^{c}
- Xyleborus impar Eggers, 1927c^{c}
- Xyleborus impexus Schedl, 1942c^{c}
- Xyleborus impressus Eichhoff, 1868a^{c b}
- Xyleborus improbus Sampson, 1913^{c}
- Xyleborus improcerus Sampson, 1921^{c}
- Xyleborus improvidus Schedl, 1935d^{c}
- Xyleborus inaequalis Schedl, 1934d^{c}
- Xyleborus inaffectatus Schedl, 1972g^{c}
- Xyleborus incertus Wood, 2007^{c}
- Xyleborus inconstans Schedl, 1962j^{c}
- Xyleborus inconveniens Schedl, 1948h^{c}
- Xyleborus incultus Wood, 1975b^{c}
- Xyleborus incurvus Eggers, 1930d^{c}
- Xyleborus indicus Eichhoff, 1878b^{c}
- Xyleborus indigens Schedl, 1955b^{c}
- Xyleborus indocorus Schedl, 1979a^{c}
- Xyleborus indonesianus Browne, 1984b^{c}
- Xyleborus industrius Sampson, 1912^{c}
- Xyleborus inermis Eichhoff, 1868a^{c}
- Xyleborus infans Hagedorn, 1910b^{c}
- Xyleborus inferior Schedl, 1976a^{c}
- Xyleborus innominatus Schedl, 1970d^{c}
- Xyleborus inoblitus Schedl, 1939g^{c}
- Xyleborus inopinatus Schedl, 1970e^{c}
- Xyleborus insignis Browne, 1984c^{c}
- Xyleborus insitivus Schedl, 1959a^{c}
- Xyleborus insolitus Bright, 1972d^{c}
- Xyleborus insularis Sharp, D., 1885^{c}
- Xyleborus insulindicus Eggers, 1923a^{c}
- Xyleborus integer Schedl, 1957d^{c}
- Xyleborus interjectus Blandford, 1894^{i c}
- Xyleborus intermedius Eggers, 1923a^{c}
- Xyleborus interponens Schedl, 1954c^{c}
- Xyleborus interpunctatus Blandford, 1898b^{c}
- Xyleborus interruptus Eggers, 1940d^{c}
- Xyleborus intersetosus Blandford, 1898b^{c}
- Xyleborus interstitialis Eichhoff, 1878b^{c}
- Xyleborus intextus Beeson, 1930^{c}
- Xyleborus intricatus Schedl, 1948f^{c}
- Xyleborus intrusus Blandford, 1898^{i c b}
- Xyleborus inurbanus Bright & Skidmore, 2002^{c}
- Xyleborus ipidia Schedl, 1972h^{c}
- Xyleborus irregularis Eggers, 1923a^{c}
- Xyleborus ishidai Niisima, 1909^{c}
- Xyleborus itatiayaensis Schedl, 1936i^{c}
- Xyleborus izuensis Murayama, 1952a^{c}

=== J-K ===
- Xyleborus jaintianus Schedl, 1967f^{c}
- Xyleborus jamaicensis Bright, 1972d^{c}
- Xyleborus jambolanaensis Schedl, 1951j^{c}
- Xyleborus japonicus Nobuchi, 1981d^{c}
- Xyleborus javanus Eggers, 1923a^{c}
- Xyleborus jongaensis Schedl, 1941d^{c}
- Xyleborus joveri Schedl, 1951f^{c}
- Xyleborus jucundus Schedl, 1954a^{c}
- Xyleborus judenkoi Schedl, 1959a^{c}
- Xyleborus justus Schedl, 1931c^{c}
- Xyleborus kadoyamaensis Murayama, 1934c^{c}
- Xyleborus kaimochii Nobuchi, 1981d^{c}
- Xyleborus kajangensis Schedl, 1942a^{c}
- Xyleborus kalopanacis Kurenzov, 1941a^{c}
- Xyleborus katangensis Eggers, 1932d^{c}
- Xyleborus katoi Browne, 1986c^{c}
- Xyleborus kauaiensis Perkins, 1900^{i c}
- Xyleborus kelantanum Schedl, 1953c^{c}
- Xyleborus kersianus Browne, 1981a^{c}
- Xyleborus khayae Schedl, 1957e^{c}
- Xyleborus khinganensis Murayama, 1943b^{c}
- Xyleborus kirishimanus Murayama, 1955^{c}
- Xyleborus kivuensis Eggers, 1935c^{c}
- Xyleborus klapperichi Schedl, 1955h^{c}
- Xyleborus kojimai Murayama, 1936a^{c}
- Xyleborus kororensis Wood, 1960a^{c}
- Xyleborus kraatzi Eichhoff, 1868c^{c}
- Xyleborus kraunhiae Niisima, 1910a^{c}
- Xyleborus kuchingensis Browne, 1955^{c}
- Xyleborus kumamotoensis Murayama, 1934c^{c}

=== L ===
- Xyleborus laciniatus Hagedorn, 1910b^{c}
- Xyleborus lacunatus Wood, 1974a^{c}
- Xyleborus laetus Niisima, 1909^{c}
- Xyleborus laevipennis Schedl, 1961e^{c}
- Xyleborus laevis Eggers, 1923a^{c}
- Xyleborus laeviusculus Blandford, 1896a^{c}
- Xyleborus lanaiensis Perkins, 1900^{i c}
- Xyleborus latecarinatus Schedl, 1936d^{c}
- Xyleborus latecavatus Eggers, 1927c^{c}
- Xyleborus latecompressus Schedl, 1936g^{c}
- Xyleborus latecornis Schedl, 1969a^{c}
- Xyleborus latetruncatus Schedl, 1942a^{c}
- Xyleborus laticaudatus Eggers, 1923a^{c}
- Xyleborus laticeps Wood, 1977b^{c}
- Xyleborus laticollis Blandford, 1896b^{c}
- Xyleborus latipennis Schedl, 1976a^{c}
- Xyleborus lativentris Schedl, 1942a^{c}
- Xyleborus latus Eggers, 1923a^{c}
- Xyleborus lenis Wood, 1974a^{c}
- Xyleborus lepidus Bright, 1972d^{c}
- Xyleborus leprosulus Schedl, 1936j^{c}
- Xyleborus leverensis Browne, 1986c^{c}
- Xyleborus lewekianus Eggers, 1923a^{c}
- Xyleborus lewisi Blandford, 1894d^{c}
- Xyleborus libra Eggers, 1923a^{c}
- Xyleborus lignographus Schedl, 1953e^{c}
- Xyleborus limatus Schedl, 1936h^{c}
- Xyleborus linearicollis Schedl, 1937h^{c}
- Xyleborus linearis Schedl, 1948f^{c}
- Xyleborus lineatopunctatus Eggers, 1927b^{c}
- Xyleborus lineatus Eggers, 1930d^{c}
- Xyleborus littoralis Perkins, 1900^{i c}
- Xyleborus loebli Schedl, 1979b^{c}
- Xyleborus longehirtus Nunberg, 1956d^{c}
- Xyleborus longicollis Browne, 1977c^{c}
- Xyleborus longideclivis Wood, 1968b^{c}
- Xyleborus longidens Eggers, 1930d^{c}
- Xyleborus longipennis Eggers, 1933b^{c}
- Xyleborus longipilus Eggers, 1926b^{c}
- Xyleborus longius Eggers, 1923a^{c}
- Xyleborus longulus Schedl, 1966f^{c}
- Xyleborus longus Eggers, 1927b^{c}
- Xyleborus loricatus Schedl, 1933d^{c}
- Xyleborus lubricus Schedl, 1941d^{c}
- Xyleborus luctuosus Eggers, 1939b^{c}
- Xyleborus lugubris Eggers, 1927c^{c}
- Xyleborus luteus Schedl, 1937b^{c}
- Xyleborus luzonicus Eggers, 1923a^{c}

=== M ===
- Xyleborus macer Blandford, 1898b^{c}
- Xyleborus machili Niisima, 1910a^{c}
- Xyleborus madagascariensis Schaufuss, C.F.C., 1891^{c}
- Xyleborus magnificus Wood, 1992a^{c}
- Xyleborus magnispinatus Beaver & Loyttyniemi (Beaver in), 1985a^{c}
- Xyleborus magnus Niisima, 1910a^{c}
- Xyleborus mahafali Schedl, 1953d^{c}
- Xyleborus maiche Eggers, 1942c^{c}
- Xyleborus major Wood & Bright, 1992^{c}
- Xyleborus majusculus Schedl, 1951m^{c}
- Xyleborus malayensis Browne, 1981a^{c}
- Xyleborus malgasicus Schedl, 1961e^{c}
- Xyleborus malloti Eggers, 1930d^{c}
- Xyleborus mamibillae Browne, 1970^{c}
- Xyleborus mancus Blandford, 1898a^{c}
- Xyleborus mangoense Schedl, 1942a^{c}
- Xyleborus maniensis Browne, 1981a^{c}
- Xyleborus marcidus Schedl, 1965c^{c}
- Xyleborus marginatulus Schedl, 1957d^{c}
- Xyleborus marginatus Eggers, 1927c^{c}
- Xyleborus marginicollis Schedl, 1936h^{c}
- Xyleborus maronicus Eggers, 1933b^{c}
- Xyleborus mascareniformis Eggers, 1927b^{c}
- Xyleborus mascarensis Eichhoff, 1878b^{c}
- Xyleborus mascarenus Hagedorn, 1908^{c}
- Xyleborus mauiensis Perkins, 1900^{i c}
- Xyleborus mediocris Schedl, 1942a^{c}
- Xyleborus melanarius Schedl, 1978c^{c}
- Xyleborus melancranis Beeson, 1930^{c}
- Xyleborus melas Eggers, 1927c^{c}
- Xyleborus melli Schedl, 1938h^{c}
- Xyleborus mendosus Schedl, 1965c^{c}
- Xyleborus meridensis Wood, 1974a^{c}
- Xyleborus meritus Wood, 1974a^{c}
- Xyleborus mesoleiulus Schedl, 1979g^{c}
- Xyleborus mesuae Eggers, 1930d^{c}
- Xyleborus metacomans Eggers, 1930d^{c}
- Xyleborus metacrucifer Browne, 1965a^{c}
- Xyleborus metacuneolus Eggers, 1940d^{c}
- Xyleborus metagermanus Schedl, 1951i^{c}
- Xyleborus metanepotulus Eggers, 1939c^{c}
- Xyleborus meuseli Reitter, 1905^{c}
- Xyleborus mexicanus Eggers, 1931a^{c}
- Xyleborus micarius Wood, 1974a^{c}
- Xyleborus micrographus Schedl, 1958b^{c}
- Xyleborus mimicus Wood, 2007^{c}
- Xyleborus mimosae Schedl, 1957d^{c}
- Xyleborus mimus Schedl, 1971e^{c}
- Xyleborus mindanaensis Eggers, 1927c^{c}
- Xyleborus minimus Schedl, 1955b^{c}
- Xyleborus minor Swaine, J.M., 1910b^{c}
- Xyleborus minusculus Eggers, 1923a^{c}
- Xyleborus minutissimus Eggers, 1930d^{c}
- Xyleborus misatoensis Nobuchi, 1981d^{c}
- Xyleborus mitosomiformis Schedl, 1953d^{c}
- Xyleborus mitosomipennis Schedl, 1953d^{c}
- Xyleborus mitosomus Schedl, 1965c^{c}
- Xyleborus mixtus Schedl, 1979g^{c}
- Xyleborus miyazakiensis Murayama, 1936a^{c}
- Xyleborus mkulumusius Schedl (Hagedorn in), 1962j^{c}
- Xyleborus moestus Eggers, 1930d^{c}
- Xyleborus molestulus Wood, 1975b^{c}
- Xyleborus molokaiensis Perkins, 1900^{i c}
- Xyleborus moluccanus Browne, 1985b^{c}
- Xyleborus monachus Blandford, 1898b^{c}
- Xyleborus monographus (Fabricius, J.C., 1792)^{c g}
- Xyleborus montanus Niisima, 1910a^{c}
- Xyleborus monticolus Schedl, 1957d^{c}
- Xyleborus morigerus Blandford, 1894b^{c}
- Xyleborus morio Eggers, 1923a^{c}
- Xyleborus morosus Schedl, 1962j^{c}
- Xyleborus morstatti Hagedorn, 1912b^{c}
- Xyleborus morulus Blandford, 1898b^{c}
- Xyleborus mpangae Browne, 1965a^{c}
- Xyleborus muasi Browne, 1961a^{c}
- Xyleborus mucronatoides Schedl, 1975f^{c}
- Xyleborus mucronatulus Eggers, 1930d^{c}
- Xyleborus mucronatus Eggers, 1923a^{c}
- Xyleborus mukunyae Schedl, 1957d^{c}
- Xyleborus multigranosum Schedl, 1964f^{c}
- Xyleborus multipunctatus Browne, 1980b^{c}
- Xyleborus multipunctulus Browne, 1984d^{c}
- Xyleborus multispinatus Eggers, 1920^{c}
- Xyleborus mumfordi Beeson, 1935b^{c}
- Xyleborus muriceus Eichhoff, 1878b^{c}
- Xyleborus murudensis Browne, 1965a^{c}
- Xyleborus mus Eggers, 1930d^{c}
- Xyleborus mussooriensis Eggers, 1930d^{c}
- Xyleborus mustus Schedl, 1972b^{c}
- Xyleborus mutabilis Schedl, 1935d^{c}
- Xyleborus muticus Blandford, 1894d^{c}
- Xyleborus mutilatus Blandford, 1894d^{c}
- Xyleborus myllus Browne, 1986a^{c}
- Xyleborus myristicae Schedl, 1939f^{c}

=== N ===
- Xyleborus nagaoensis Murayama, 1934c^{c}
- Xyleborus nakazawai Browne, 1984a^{c}
- Xyleborus nameranus Murayama, 1954b^{c}
- Xyleborus namibiae Schedl, 1982^{c}
- Xyleborus nandarivatus Schedl, 1950f^{c}
- Xyleborus nanus Blandford, 1896f^{c}
- Xyleborus natalensis Schaufuss, C.F.C., 1891^{c}
- Xyleborus neardus Schedl, 1950g^{c}
- Xyleborus neglectus Schedl, 1957d^{c}
- Xyleborus neivai Eggers, 1928c^{c}
- Xyleborus neoadjunctus Schedl, 1967d^{c}
- Xyleborus neocavipenne Schedl, 1977f^{c}
- Xyleborus neocrucifer Schedl, 1955i^{c}
- Xyleborus neocylindricus Schedl, 1942a^{c}
- Xyleborus neogracilis Schedl, 1954b^{c}
- Xyleborus neohybridus Schedl, 1942a^{c}
- Xyleborus neoscabridus Schedl, 1972b^{c}
- Xyleborus neosphenos Schedl, 1976a^{c}
- Xyleborus neotruncatus Schedl, 1978c^{c}
- Xyleborus nepocranus Schedl, 1939f^{c}
- Xyleborus nepos Eggers, 1923a^{c}
- Xyleborus nepotulomorphus Eggers, 1936e^{c}
- Xyleborus nepotulus Eggers, 1923a^{c}
- Xyleborus neptunus Schaufuss, C.F.C., 1891^{c}
- Xyleborus nesianus Beeson, 1940^{c}
- Xyleborus nevermanni Schedl, 1935d^{c}
- Xyleborus niger Sampson, 1912^{c}
- Xyleborus nigericus Browne, 1970^{c}
- Xyleborus nigrescens Browne, 1980b^{c}
- Xyleborus nigricollis Hagedorn, 1905b^{c}
- Xyleborus nigripennis Schedl, 1951i^{c}
- Xyleborus nigroaffinis Beeson, 1940^{c}
- Xyleborus nigropilosus Eggers, 1943c^{c}
- Xyleborus nigrosetosus Schedl, 1939f^{c}
- Xyleborus nitellus Browne, 1984d^{c}
- Xyleborus nitens Browne, 1984d^{c}
- Xyleborus nitidiloides Schedl, 1951i^{c}
- Xyleborus nitidior Eggers, 1940d^{c}
- Xyleborus nitidipennis Roubal, 1937^{c}
- Xyleborus nitidulus Eggers, 1927a^{c}
- Xyleborus nitidus Schedl, 1951i^{c}
- Xyleborus nodulosus Eggers, 1941b^{c}
- Xyleborus norfolkensis Schedl, 1972b^{c}
- Xyleborus nossi Schedl, 1961e^{c}
- Xyleborus notatus Eggers, 1941a^{c}
- Xyleborus novagranadensis Eggers, 1941a^{c}
- Xyleborus novaguineanus Schedl, 1936g^{c}
- Xyleborus novateutonicus Schedl, 1954b^{c}
- Xyleborus novus Eggers, 1923a^{c}
- Xyleborus noxius Sampson, 1913^{c}
- Xyleborus nsafukalae Schedl, 1957d^{c}
- Xyleborus nubilus Samuelson, 1981^{i c}
- Xyleborus nudipennis Schedl, 1951i^{c}
- Xyleborus nudus Nunberg, 1956d^{c}
- Xyleborus nugax Schedl, 1939e^{c}
- Xyleborus nuperus Bright, 1972d^{c}
- Xyleborus nutans Schedl, 1942a^{c}
- Xyleborus nuuanus Schedl, 1941f^{c}
- Xyleborus nyssae Hopkins, 1915b^{c}

=== O ===
- Xyleborus oahuensis Perkins, 1900^{i c}
- Xyleborus obesus LeConte, 1868^{i c}
- Xyleborus obiensis Browne, 1980a^{c}
- Xyleborus oblicatus Schedl, 1980d^{c}
- Xyleborus obliquesectum Eggers, 1927c^{c}
- Xyleborus obliquus Bright, 1968b^{c}
- Xyleborus oblongus Schedl, 1950d^{c}
- Xyleborus obscurus Schedl, 1972q^{c}
- Xyleborus obstipus Schedl, 1935f^{c}
- Xyleborus obtrusus Schedl (Sampson in), 1960i^{c}
- Xyleborus obtusatus Schedl, 1972m^{c}
- Xyleborus obtusicollis Schedl, 1938g^{c}
- Xyleborus obtusipennis Schedl (Eggers in), 1962j^{c}
- Xyleborus obtusitruncatus Schedl, 1948f^{c}
- Xyleborus obtusus Eggers, 1923a^{c}
- Xyleborus ocellatus Wood, 1974a^{c}
- Xyleborus octiesdentatus Murayama, 1931a^{c}
- Xyleborus octospinosus Eggers, 1920^{c}
- Xyleborus ohausi Hagedorn, 1912a^{c}
- Xyleborus ohnoi Browne, 1980a^{c}
- Xyleborus ohtoensis Nobuchi, 1981d^{c}
- Xyleborus okinosenensis Murayama, 1961b^{c}
- Xyleborus okoumeensis Schedl, 1935f^{c}
- Xyleborus ominosus Schedl, 1962j^{c}
- Xyleborus omissus Schedl, 1961e^{c}
- Xyleborus oneratus Schedl, 1976a^{c}
- Xyleborus onerosus Schedl, 1942a^{c}
- Xyleborus onoharaensis Murayama, 1934c^{c}
- Xyleborus opacicauda Eggers, 1940d^{c}
- Xyleborus opacithorax Schedl, 1937b^{c}
- Xyleborus opalescens Schedl, 1937e^{c}
- Xyleborus oparunus Beeson, 1940^{c}
- Xyleborus operosus Schedl, 1973e^{c}
- Xyleborus opimatum Schedl, 1975a^{c}
- Xyleborus opimulus Schedl, 1976a^{c}
- Xyleborus opimus Wood, 1974a^{c}
- Xyleborus optatus Schedl, 1973e^{c}
- Xyleborus opulentus Schedl, 1975f^{c}
- Xyleborus oralis Schedl, 1961e^{c}
- Xyleborus orbatus Blandford, 1894d^{c}
- Xyleborus orbicaudatus Eggers, 1940d^{c}
- Xyleborus orbiculatus Schedl, 1942a^{c}
- Xyleborus orbus Browne, 1966^{c}
- Xyleborus orientalis Eggers, 1933f^{c}
- Xyleborus osumiensis Murayama, 1934c^{c}
- Xyleborus ovalicollis Eggers, 1930d^{c}
- Xyleborus ovatus Eggers, 1932d^{c}

=== P ===
- Xyleborus pacificus Nunberg, 1959a^{c}
- Xyleborus palatus Wood, 1974a^{c}
- Xyleborus palembangensis Schedl, 1939f^{c}
- Xyleborus pallidipennis Eggers, 1940d^{c}
- Xyleborus pandae Schedl, 1957d^{c}
- Xyleborus pandulus Wood, 1974a^{c}
- Xyleborus papatrae Schedl, 1972i^{c}
- Xyleborus papuanus Blandford, 1896b^{c}
- Xyleborus paradoxus Schedl, 1972g^{c}
- Xyleborus paraguayensis Schedl, 1948f^{c}
- Xyleborus parallelocollis Eggers, 1933b^{c}
- Xyleborus parallelus Eggers, 1936c^{c}
- Xyleborus parcellus Wood, 1968b^{c}
- Xyleborus pardous Eggers, 1943d^{c}
- Xyleborus parinarie Schedl, 1962j^{c}
- Xyleborus partitus Browne, 1974a^{c}
- Xyleborus parvior Browne, 1981b^{c}
- Xyleborus parvipunctatus Eggers, 1943a^{c}
- Xyleborus parvispinosus Schedl, 1951i^{c}
- Xyleborus parvulus Eichhoff, 1868c^{c}
- Xyleborus parvus Eichhoff, 1878b^{c}
- Xyleborus pecanus Hopkins, 1915b^{c}
- Xyleborus pedella Schedl, 1969a^{c}
- Xyleborus peguensis Eggers, 1930d^{c}
- Xyleborus pele Samuelson, 1981^{i c}
- Xyleborus peliciformis Schedl, 1936j^{c}
- Xyleborus pelliculosus Eichhoff, 1878b^{c}
- Xyleborus penicillatus Hagedorn, 1910b^{c}
- Xyleborus pentaclethrae Schedl, 1957d^{c}
- Xyleborus perakensis Schedl, 1942a^{c}
- Xyleborus peramploides Schedl, 1957d^{c}
- Xyleborus peramplus Schedl, 1950d^{c}
- Xyleborus perbrevis Schedl, 1951i^{c}
- Xyleborus percorthyloides Schedl, 1957d^{c}
- Xyleborus percorthylus Schedl, 1935f^{c}
- Xyleborus percristatus Eggers, 1939a^{c}
- Xyleborus percuneolus Schedl, 1951i^{c}
- Xyleborus perdeclivis Schedl, 1957d^{c}
- Xyleborus perdiligens Schedl, 1937b^{c}
- Xyleborus perdix Schedl, 1939e^{c}
- Xyleborus perebeae Blandford, 1898b^{c}
- Xyleborus peregrinus Eggers, 1944c^{c}
- Xyleborus perexiguus Schedl, 1971c^{c}
- Xyleborus perforans (Wollaston, 1857)^{i c}
- Xyleborus perlaetus Schedl, 1960h^{c}
- Xyleborus perlongus Eggers, 1943a^{c}
- Xyleborus permarginatus Schedl, 1933d^{c}
- Xyleborus perminor Schedl, 1957d^{c}
- Xyleborus perminutissimus Schedl, 1934d^{c}
- Xyleborus pernitidus Schedl, 1954a^{c}
- Xyleborus pernotus Schedl, 1934d^{c}
- Xyleborus perorientalis Schedl, 1957d^{c}
- Xyleborus perparva Sampson, 1922b^{c}
- Xyleborus perpilosellum Schedl, 1935b^{c}
- Xyleborus perplexus Schedl, 1969b^{c}
- Xyleborus perpunctatus Schedl, 1971c^{c}
- Xyleborus perpusillus Eggers, 1927b^{c}
- Xyleborus perquadrispinosus Schedl, 1957d^{c}
- Xyleborus persimilis Eggers, 1927c^{c}
- Xyleborus persphenos Schedl, 1970a^{c}
- Xyleborus perspinidens Schedl, 1957d^{c}
- Xyleborus perspinifer Schedl, 1957d^{c}
- Xyleborus pertortuosus Schedl, 1942a^{c}
- Xyleborus pertuberculatus Eggers, 1940d^{c}
- Xyleborus peruvianus Schedl, 1951m^{c}
- Xyleborus perversus Hagedorn, 1905a^{c}
- Xyleborus pfeili Wood & Bright, 1992^{c b}
- Xyleborus philippinensis Eichhoff, 1878b^{c}
- Xyleborus picinus Schedl, 1957d^{c}
- Xyleborus pileatulus Schedl, 1975f^{c}
- Xyleborus pilifer Eggers, 1923a^{c}
- Xyleborus pilipenne Eggers, 1940d^{c}
- Xyleborus pilipunctatus Browne, 1966^{c}
- Xyleborus pilosellus Schedl, 1957d^{c}
- Xyleborus pilosulum Eggers, 1927c^{c}
- Xyleborus pilosus Eggers, 1923a^{c}
- Xyleborus pinguis Schedl, 1961e^{c}
- Xyleborus pini Eichhoff, 1868a^{c}
- Xyleborus pinicola Eggers, 1930d^{c}
- Xyleborus pinivorus Browne, 1980a^{c}
- Xyleborus pithecolobius Schedl, 1937c^{c}
- Xyleborus pityogenes Schedl, 1936g^{c}
- Xyleborus plagiatus LeConte, 1868^{c}
- Xyleborus planicollis Zimmermann, 1868^{i c}
- Xyleborus planipennis Schedl, 1955b^{c}
- Xyleborus planodeclivis Browne, 1974a^{c}
- Xyleborus planotruncatum Schedl, 1942a^{c}
- Xyleborus platyurus Browne, 1984f^{c}
- Xyleborus pleiades Samuelson, 1981^{i c}
- Xyleborus politus Hagedorn, 1905a^{c}
- Xyleborus polyalthiae Schedl, 1952i^{c}
- Xyleborus polyodon Eggers, 1923a^{c}
- Xyleborus pometianus Schedl, 1939e^{c}
- Xyleborus popondettae Browne, 1970^{c}
- Xyleborus populi Swaine, J.M., 1917^{c}
- Xyleborus posticegranulatus Schedl, 1938h^{c}
- Xyleborus posticepilosus Schedl, 1951i^{c}
- Xyleborus posticespinatum Eggers, 1940c^{c}
- Xyleborus posticestriatus Eggers, 1939c^{c}
- Xyleborus posticoides Schedl, 1948f^{c}
- Xyleborus posticus Eichhoff, 1869b^{c}
- Xyleborus potens Schedl, 1964c^{c}
- Xyleborus pourriensis Schedl, 1950h^{c}
- Xyleborus praecursor Schedl, 1962j^{c}
- Xyleborus praestans Wood, 1980b^{c}
- Xyleborus praeusta Eggers, 1923a^{c}
- Xyleborus praevius Blandford, 1894d^{c}
- Xyleborus princeps Blandford, 1898b^{c}
- Xyleborus principalis Eichhoff, 1878b^{c}
- Xyleborus priscus Eggers, 1920^{c}
- Xyleborus pristis Wood, 1974a^{c}
- Xyleborus privatus Beeson, 1930^{c}
- Xyleborus procer Eichhoff, 1878b^{c}
- Xyleborus procerior Schedl, 1942c^{c}
- Xyleborus procerrimus Schedl, 1969a^{c}
- Xyleborus procerrissimus Schedl, 1942a^{c}
- Xyleborus productus Hagedorn, 1905a^{c}
- Xyleborus profondus Schedl, 1961e^{c}
- Xyleborus prolatus Wood, 1974a^{c}
- Xyleborus prolixus Schedl, 1962j^{c}
- Xyleborus pronunciatus Eggers, 1936e^{c}
- Xyleborus propinquus Eichhoff, 1869b^{c}
- Xyleborus protensus Eggers, 1930d^{c}
- Xyleborus protii Browne, 1984d^{c}
- Xyleborus protinus Wood, 1974a^{c}
- Xyleborus proximus Eggers, 1943c^{c}
- Xyleborus pruinosulus Beaver & Browne (Browne in), 1978^{c}
- Xyleborus pruinosum Blandford, 1896b^{c}
- Xyleborus psaltes Schedl, 1954e^{c}
- Xyleborus pseudoacuminatus Wood, 2007^{c}
- Xyleborus pseudoambasius Schedl, 1954e^{c}
- Xyleborus pseudoangustatus Schedl, 1948g^{c}
- Xyleborus pseudobarbatus Schedl, 1942a^{c}
- Xyleborus pseudobrasiliensis Eggers, 1941a^{c}
- Xyleborus pseudocitri Schedl, 1959a^{c}
- Xyleborus pseudococcotrypes Eggers, 1941a^{c}
- Xyleborus pseudocolossus Schedl, 1942d^{c}
- Xyleborus pseudocomans Eggers, 1930d^{c}
- Xyleborus pseudocrucifer Schedl, 1939a^{c}
- Xyleborus pseudocylindricus Eggers, 1927b^{c}
- Xyleborus pseudoferox Wood, 2007^{c}
- Xyleborus pseudofoersteri Schedl, 1942a^{c}
- Xyleborus pseudogracilis Schedl, 1937h^{c}
- Xyleborus pseudohystrix Schedl, 1959p^{c}
- Xyleborus pseudomajor Schedl, 1951i^{c}
- Xyleborus pseudopilifer Schedl, 1936d^{c}
- Xyleborus pseudopityogenes Eggers, 1943e^{c}
- Xyleborus pseudoprocer Schedl, 1948f^{c}
- Xyleborus pseudopunctulus Schedl, 1942a^{c}
- Xyleborus pseudorudis Schedl, 1951i^{c}
- Xyleborus pseudosolidus Schedl, 1936g^{c}
- Xyleborus pseudosolitarius Eggers, 1933b^{c}
- Xyleborus pseudotenuis Schedl, 1936i^{c}
- Xyleborus pseudovalidus Eggers, 1925^{c}
- Xyleborus puberulus Blandford, 1896b^{c}
- Xyleborus pubescens Zimmermann, 1868^{i c b}
- Xyleborus pubifer Schedl, 1972m^{c}
- Xyleborus pubipennis Schedl, 1974c^{c}
- Xyleborus puer Eggers, 1923a^{c}
- Xyleborus pulchripes Schedl, 1958f^{c}
- Xyleborus pulcnerrimus Schedl, 1948d^{c}
- Xyleborus pulla Schedl, 1952b^{c}
- Xyleborus pumilus Eggers, 1923a^{c}
- Xyleborus punctatopilosum Schedl, 1936g^{c}
- Xyleborus punctatum Eggers, 1923a^{c}
- Xyleborus punctilicolle Schedl, 1942a^{c}
- Xyleborus punctipennis LeConte, 1878b^{c}
- Xyleborus punctulatus Kurenzov, 1948a^{c}
- Xyleborus pusillus Schedl, 1961f^{c}
- Xyleborus pusio Eggers, 1941a^{c}
- Xyleborus putputensis Browne, 1986a^{c}
- Xyleborus pygmaeus Eggers, 1940d^{c}

=== Q-R ===
- Xyleborus quadraticollis Eggers, 1923a^{c}
- Xyleborus quadratus Blandford, 1898b^{c}
- Xyleborus quadricostata Schedl, 1942d^{c}
- Xyleborus quadricuspis Schedl, 1942d^{c}
- Xyleborus quadridens Eggers, 1930d^{c}
- Xyleborus quadridentatus Schedl, 1957d^{c}
- Xyleborus quadrisignatus Schedl, 1972m^{c}
- Xyleborus quadrispinis Schedl, 1953d^{c}
- Xyleborus quadrispinosulus Eggers, 1923a^{c}
- Xyleborus quadrispinosus Eichhoff, 1878b^{c}
- Xyleborus quasimodo Browne, 1980e^{c}
- Xyleborus quercicola Eggers, 1926b^{c}
- Xyleborus quercus Kurenzov, 1948a^{c}
- Xyleborus rameus Schedl, 1940b^{c}
- Xyleborus ramulorum Schedl, 1957d^{c}
- Xyleborus rapandus Schedl, 1942c^{c}
- Xyleborus rapanus Beeson, 1940^{c}
- Xyleborus raucus Schedl, 1950c^{c}
- Xyleborus recidens Sampson, 1923b^{c}
- Xyleborus reconditus Schedl, 1963f^{c}
- Xyleborus repositus Schedl, 1942a^{c}
- Xyleborus resecans Eggers, 1930d^{c}
- Xyleborus resectus Eggers, 1927b^{c}
- Xyleborus resinosus Schedl, 1939a^{c}
- Xyleborus restrictus Schedl, 1939f^{c}
- Xyleborus retrusus Schedl, 1940c^{c}
- Xyleborus retusicollis Zimmermann, 1868^{c}
- Xyleborus retusiformis Schedl, 1936j^{c}
- Xyleborus retusus Eichhoff, 1868c^{c}
- Xyleborus reunionis Schedl, 1961e^{c}
- Xyleborus revocabile Schedl, 1942c^{c}
- Xyleborus rhodesianus Eggers, 1936c^{c}
- Xyleborus ricini Eggers, 1932d^{c}
- Xyleborus riehli Eichhoff, 1878b^{c}
- Xyleborus rileyi Hopkins, 1915b^{c}
- Xyleborus rimulosus Schedl, 1959a^{c}
- Xyleborus robertsi Browne, 1963b^{c}
- Xyleborus robustipennis Schedl, 1954c^{c}
- Xyleborus robustulus Schedl, 1957d^{c}
- Xyleborus robustus Schedl, 1933e^{c}
- Xyleborus rodgeri Beeson, 1930^{c}
- Xyleborus rosseli Schedl, 1975m^{c}
- Xyleborus rothkirchi Eggers, 1920^{c}
- Xyleborus rotundicollis Browne, 1984f^{c}
- Xyleborus ruandae Schedl, 1957d^{c}
- Xyleborus ruber Eichhoff, 1868c^{c}
- Xyleborus rubricollis Eichhoff, 1875^{c}
- Xyleborus rudis Eggers, 1930d^{c}
- Xyleborus rufipes Eggers, 1933b^{c}
- Xyleborus rufithorax Eichhoff, 1869b^{c}
- Xyleborus rufobrunneus Eggers, 1929e^{c}
- Xyleborus rufoniger Schedl, 1934d^{c}
- Xyleborus rufonitidum Schedl, 1951i^{c}
- Xyleborus rufopiceus Eggers, 1932d^{c}
- Xyleborus rufus Schedl, 1951i^{c}
- Xyleborus rugatus Blackburn, 1885^{i c}
- Xyleborus rugicollis Blandford, 1898b^{c}
- Xyleborus rugipennis Schedl, 1953c^{c}
- Xyleborus rugosipennis Schedl, 1963f^{c}
- Xyleborus rugosus Eggers, 1920^{c}
- Xyleborus rugulosipes Wood, 2007^{c}
- Xyleborus rugulosus Eggers, 1922c^{c}
- Xyleborus russulus Schedl, 1942c^{c}
- Xyleborus rusticus Wood, 1974a^{c}

=== S ===
- Xyleborus sacchari Hopkins, 1915b^{c}
- Xyleborus sakalava Schedl, 1953d^{c}
- Xyleborus sakoae Schedl, 1961e^{c}
- Xyleborus salvini Blandford, 1898b^{c}
- Xyleborus sampsoni Donisthorpe, 1940^{c}
- Xyleborus sandragotoensis Schedl, 1961e^{c}
- Xyleborus sanguinicollis Blandford, 1898b^{c}
- Xyleborus sarawakensis Eggers, 1923a^{c}
- Xyleborus sartor Schedl, 1961e^{c}
- Xyleborus satoi Schedl, 1961e^{c}
- Xyleborus sauropteroides Schedl, 1970d^{c}
- Xyleborus sauropterus Schedl, 1953d^{c}
- Xyleborus sayi (Hopkins, 1915)^{i c}
- Xyleborus scaber Schedl, 1948f^{c}
- Xyleborus scabratus Schedl, 1941^{i c}
- Xyleborus scabricollis Wood & Bright, 1992^{c}
- Xyleborus scabridus Schedl, 1952i^{c}
- Xyleborus scabrior Schedl, 1954e^{c}
- Xyleborus scabripennis Blandford, 1896b^{c}
- Xyleborus scalaris Schedl, 1935d^{c}
- Xyleborus scalptor Schedl, 1961e^{c}
- Xyleborus scapulare Schedl, 1942a^{c}
- Xyleborus schaufussi Blandford, 1894d^{c}
- Xyleborus schedli Eggers, 1934a^{c}
- Xyleborus schildi Schedl, 1935d^{c}
- Xyleborus schizolobius Schedl, 1950i^{c}
- Xyleborus schlichi Stebbing, E.P., 1914^{c}
- Xyleborus schoenherri Schedl, 1981a^{c}
- Xyleborus schoutedeni Eggers, 1927a^{c}
- Xyleborus schreineri Eggers, 1920^{c}
- Xyleborus schultzei Schedl, 1951i^{c}
- Xyleborus schwarzi Hopkins, 1915b^{c}
- Xyleborus sclerocaryae Schedl, 1962h^{c}
- Xyleborus scobinatus Hagedorn, 1910b^{c}
- Xyleborus scopulorum Hopkins, 1915b^{c}
- Xyleborus scorpius Schedl, 1942a^{c}
- Xyleborus sculptilis Schedl, 1964g^{c}
- Xyleborus seiryorensis Murayama, 1930b^{c}
- Xyleborus sejugatus Schedl, 1942a^{c}
- Xyleborus semicarinatus Schedl, 1942c^{c}
- Xyleborus semicircularis Schedl, 1973e^{c}
- Xyleborus semicostatus Schedl, 1948f^{c}
- Xyleborus semigranosus Blandford, 1896b^{c}
- Xyleborus semigranulatus Schedl, 1931c^{c}
- Xyleborus seminitens Blandford, 1895a^{c}
- Xyleborus semiopacus Eichhoff, 1878b^{c}
- Xyleborus semipilosus Eggers, 1932d^{c}
- Xyleborus semipolitus Schedl, 1951i^{c}
- Xyleborus semipunctatus Eggers, 1933b^{c}
- Xyleborus semirufus Schedl, 1959a^{c}
- Xyleborus semistriatus Schedl, 1971c^{c}
- Xyleborus semitruncatus Schedl, 1942d^{c}
- Xyleborus senchalensis Beeson, 1930^{c}
- Xyleborus sentosus Eichhoff, 1868c^{c}
- Xyleborus separandus Schedl, 1971c^{c}
- Xyleborus septentrionalis Niisima, 1909^{c}
- Xyleborus sereinuus Eggers, 1923a^{c}
- Xyleborus seriatus Blandford, 1894d^{c b}
- Xyleborus serratus Swaine, J.M., 1910b^{c}
- Xyleborus setosus Eichhoff, 1868c^{c}
- Xyleborus setulosus Eggers, 1940d^{c}
- Xyleborus sexdentatus Eggers, 1940d^{c}
- Xyleborus sexnotatus Schedl, 1970e^{c}
- Xyleborus sexspinatum Schedl, 1935f^{c}
- Xyleborus sextuberculatus Schedl, 1952a^{c}
- Xyleborus sharpae Hopkins, 1915b^{c}
- Xyleborus sharpi Blandford, 1898b^{c}
- Xyleborus shionomisakiensis Murayama, 1951a^{c}
- Xyleborus shiva Maiti & Saha, 1986^{c}
- Xyleborus shoreae (Stebbing, E.P., 1909b)^{c}
- Xyleborus sibsagaricus Eggers, 1930d^{c}
- Xyleborus siclus Schedl, 1936j^{c}
- Xyleborus siginis Eggers (Hagedorn in), 1920^{c}
- Xyleborus signatipennis Schedl, 1961e^{c}
- Xyleborus signatus Schedl, 1948f^{c}
- Xyleborus signiceps Schedl, 1962j^{c}
- Xyleborus signifer Schedl, 1968b^{c}
- Xyleborus silvestris Beeson, 1929^{c}
- Xyleborus similans Eggers, 1940c^{c}
- Xyleborus similaris Schedl, 1965c^{c}
- Xyleborus similis Eggers, 1927c^{c}
- Xyleborus simillimus Perkins, 1900^{i c}
- Xyleborus simulatus Bright, 1972d^{c}
- Xyleborus sinensis Eggers, 1941b^{c}
- Xyleborus siobanus Eggers, 1923a^{c}
- Xyleborus siporanus Hagedorn, 1910b^{c}
- Xyleborus sirambeanus Eggers, 1923a^{c}
- Xyleborus sisyrnophorum Hagedorn, 1910b^{c}
- Xyleborus sobrinus Eichhoff, 1875^{c}
- Xyleborus societatis Beeson, 1935a^{c}
- Xyleborus solidus Eichhoff, 1868c^{c}
- Xyleborus solitariceps Schedl, 1954b^{c}
- Xyleborus solitariformis Schedl, 1976a^{c}
- Xyleborus solitarinus Schedl, 1950i^{c}
- Xyleborus solitaripennis Schedl, 1976a^{c}
- Xyleborus solitarius Hagedorn, 1905a^{c}
- Xyleborus solomonicus Schedl, 1970b^{c}
- Xyleborus soltaui Hopkins, 1915b^{c}
- Xyleborus solutus Schedl, 1962j^{c}
- Xyleborus sordicaudulus Eggers, 1927c^{c}
- Xyleborus sparsegranulosus Kirkendall & Jordal, 2006^{c}
- Xyleborus sparsipilosus Eggers, 1933b^{c}
- Xyleborus sparsus LeConte, 1868^{c}
- Xyleborus spathipennis Eichhoff, 1868c^{c}
- Xyleborus spatulatus Blandford, 1896b^{c}
- Xyleborus speciosus Schedl, 1975e^{c}
- Xyleborus sphenos Sampson, 1912^{c}
- Xyleborus spicatulus Browne, 1986c^{c}
- Xyleborus spicatus Browne, 1986a^{c}
- Xyleborus spiculatulus Schedl, 1965c^{c}
- Xyleborus spiculatus Schaufuss, C.F.C., 1891^{c}
- Xyleborus spinachius Schedl, 1955b^{c}
- Xyleborus spinatus Eggers, 1923a^{c}
- Xyleborus spinibarbe Schedl, 1955i^{c}
- Xyleborus spinicornis Schedl, 1975f^{c}
- Xyleborus spinidens Eggers, 1920^{c}
- Xyleborus spinifer Eggers, 1920^{c}
- Xyleborus spiniger Schedl, 1954b^{c}
- Xyleborus spinipennis Eggers, 1930d^{c}
- Xyleborus spinipes Schedl, 1957d^{c}
- Xyleborus spinosulus Schedl, 1934g^{c}
- Xyleborus spinosus Schaufuss, C.F.C., 1891^{c}
- Xyleborus spinulosus Blandford, 1898^{i c b}
- Xyleborus splendidus Schaufuss, C.F.C., 1897b^{c}
- Xyleborus squamatilis Schedl, 1955b^{c}
- Xyleborus squamulatus Eichhoff, 1869b^{c}
- Xyleborus squamulosus Eggers, 1923a^{c}
- Xyleborus starki Nunberg, 1956d^{c}
- Xyleborus stenographus Schedl, 1971c^{c}
- Xyleborus striatotruncatus Schedl, 1936j^{c}
- Xyleborus striatulus Browne, 1980c^{c}
- Xyleborus strohmeyeri Schedl, 1975e^{c}
- Xyleborus strombiformis Schedl, 1971c^{c}
- Xyleborus strombosiopsis Schedl, 1957d^{c}
- Xyleborus suaui Schedl, 1973f^{c}
- Xyleborus subadjunctus Schedl, 1950d^{c}
- Xyleborus subaffinis Eggers, 1933b^{c}
- Xyleborus subagnatus Schedl (Eggers in), 1979c^{c}
- Xyleborus subasperulus Eggers, 1935c^{c}
- Xyleborus subcarinulatus Eggers, 1932d^{c}
- Xyleborus subcostatus Eichhoff, 1869a^{c}
- Xyleborus subcrenulatus Eggers, 1932d^{c}
- Xyleborus subcribrosus Blandford, 1896b^{c}
- Xyleborus subdentatulus Browne, 1986a^{c}
- Xyleborus subdentatus Browne, 1974b^{c}
- Xyleborus subdepressus Rey, 1885^{c}
- Xyleborus subdolosus Schedl, 1942d^{c}
- Xyleborus subductus Schedl, 1976a^{c}
- Xyleborus subemarginatus Eggers, 1940d^{c}
- Xyleborus subgranosus Schedl, 1962j^{c}
- Xyleborus subgranulatus Eggers, 1930d^{c}
- Xyleborus subitus Schedl, 1948f^{c}
- Xyleborus sublinearis Eggers, 1940d^{c}
- Xyleborus sublongus Eggers, 1927c^{c}
- Xyleborus submarginatus Blandford, 1896b^{c}
- Xyleborus submolestus Schedl, 1941d^{c}
- Xyleborus submontanus Schedl, 1960i^{c}
- Xyleborus subnepotulus Eggers, 1930d^{c}
- Xyleborus subobtusum Schedl, 1942a^{c}
- Xyleborus subparallelus Eggers, 1940d^{c}
- Xyleborus subplanatus Eggers, 1943a^{c}
- Xyleborus subpruinosus Browne, 1986a^{c}
- Xyleborus subsimiliformis Eggers, 1939b^{c}
- Xyleborus subsimilis Eggers, 1930d^{c}
- Xyleborus subspinosus Eggers, 1930d^{c}
- Xyleborus subsulcatus Eggers, 1927a^{c}
- Xyleborus subtilis Schedl, 1970e^{c}
- Xyleborus subtruncatus Schedl, 1972m^{c}
- Xyleborus subtuberculatus Eggers, 1927a^{c}
- Xyleborus sulcaticeps Schedl, 1962j^{c}
- Xyleborus sulcatulus Eggers, 1939b^{c}
- Xyleborus sulcatus Eggers, 1930d^{c}
- Xyleborus sulcicauda Schedl, 1972b^{c}
- Xyleborus sulcinoides Schedl, 1974d^{c}
- Xyleborus sulcipenne Eggers, 1932d^{c}
- Xyleborus sumatranus Hagedorn, 1908^{c}
- Xyleborus sundaensis Eggers, 1923a^{c}
- Xyleborus superbulus Schedl, 1958k^{c}
- Xyleborus superbus Schedl, 1942c^{c}
- Xyleborus sus Schedl, 1973e^{c}
- Xyleborus suturalis Eggers, 1930d^{c}
- Xyleborus swezeyi Beeson, 1929^{c}
- Xyleborus syzygii Nunberg, 1959c^{c}
- Xyleborus szentivanyi Schedl, 1968e^{c}

=== T ===
- Xyleborus taboensis Schedl, 1952c^{c}
- Xyleborus tachygraphus Zimmermann, 1868^{c}
- Xyleborus taichuensis Schedl, 1952c^{c}
- Xyleborus taitonus Eggers, 1939c^{c}
- Xyleborus taiwanensis Browne, 1980b^{c}
- Xyleborus takeharai Browne, 1983a^{c}
- Xyleborus takinoyensis Murayama, 1953b^{c}
- Xyleborus talumalai Browne, 1966^{c}
- Xyleborus tanganjikaensis Schedl, 1937b^{c}
- Xyleborus tanganus Hagedorn, 1910b^{c}
- Xyleborus tanibe Schedl, 1965c^{c}
- Xyleborus tantalus Schedl, 1941^{i c}
- Xyleborus tapatapaoensis Schedl, 1951k^{c}
- Xyleborus taxicornis Schedl, 1971c^{c}
- Xyleborus tecleae Schedl, 1957e^{c}
- Xyleborus tectonae Nunberg, 1956d^{c}
- Xyleborus tectus Schedl, 1972h^{c}
- Xyleborus tegalensis Eggers, 1923a^{c}
- Xyleborus temetiuicus Beeson, 1935b^{c}
- Xyleborus tenebrosus Schedl, 1937b^{c}
- Xyleborus tenella Schedl, 1959a^{c}
- Xyleborus tenellus Schedl, 1957d^{c}
- Xyleborus teninabani Browne, 1986c^{c}
- Xyleborus tenuigraphum Schedl, 1953e^{c}
- Xyleborus tenuipennis Browne, 1974a^{c}
- Xyleborus tenuis Schedl, 1948f^{c}
- Xyleborus tereticollis Schedl, 1951i^{c}
- Xyleborus terminatus Eggers, 1930d^{c}
- Xyleborus testudo Eggers, 1939c^{c}
- Xyleborus tetracanthus Beeson, 1941^{c}
- Xyleborus theae Eggers, 1940d^{c}
- Xyleborus timidus Schedl, 1973f^{c}
- Xyleborus tinnitus Schedl, 1941d^{c}
- Xyleborus titubanter Schedl, 1948h^{c}
- Xyleborus todo Kono, 1938b^{c}
- Xyleborus tolimanus Eggers, 1928c^{c}
- Xyleborus tomentosus Eggers, 1939b^{c}
- Xyleborus tomicoides Eggers, 1923a^{c}
- Xyleborus tonkinensis Schedl, 1934c^{c}
- Xyleborus tonsus Wood, 1977b^{c}
- Xyleborus torquatus Eichhoff, 1868c^{c}
- Xyleborus tortuosus Schedl, 1942a^{c}
- Xyleborus transitus Schedl, 1962j^{c}
- Xyleborus trapezicollis Schedl, 1971c^{c}
- Xyleborus trepanicauda Eggers, 1923a^{c}
- Xyleborus triangi Schedl, 1958b^{c}
- Xyleborus triangularis Schedl, 1975f^{c}
- Xyleborus tribulatus Wood, 1974a^{c}
- Xyleborus trinidadensis Schedl, 1961a^{c}
- Xyleborus trispinatus Browne, 1981a^{c}
- Xyleborus tristiculus Wood, 1975b^{c}
- Xyleborus tristis Eggers, 1930d^{c}
- Xyleborus triton Schaufuss, C.F.C., 1905^{c}
- Xyleborus trolaki Schedl, 1939e^{c}
- Xyleborus tropicus Hagedorn, 1910b^{c}
- Xyleborus truncatellus Schedl, 1951i^{c}
- Xyleborus truncaticauda Browne, 1984d^{c}
- Xyleborus truncatiferus Schedl, 1955b^{c}
- Xyleborus truncatiformis Eggers, 1923a^{c}
- Xyleborus truncatipennis Schedl, 1961f^{c}
- Xyleborus truncatulus Schedl, 1957d^{c}
- Xyleborus truncatus Sharp, D., 1885^{c}
- Xyleborus trux Schedl, 1937b^{c}
- Xyleborus tsukubanus Murayama, 1954b^{c}
- Xyleborus tuberculifer Eggers, 1923a^{c}
- Xyleborus tuberculosissimum Eggers, 1940d^{c}
- Xyleborus tuberculosus Browne, 1981b^{c}
- Xyleborus tumidus Schedl, 1975f^{c}
- Xyleborus tumucensis Hagedorn, 1905a^{c}
- Xyleborus tunggali Schedl, 1936j^{c}
- Xyleborus turbineus Sampson, 1923b^{c}
- Xyleborus turgidus Schedl, 1962j^{c}
- Xyleborus turraeanthus Schedl, 1957d^{c}

=== U-Z ===
- Xyleborus ugandaensis Schedl, 1957e^{c}
- Xyleborus umbratulus Schedl, 1975g^{c}
- Xyleborus umbratum Eggers, 1941b^{c}
- Xyleborus uncatus Schedl, 1970e^{c}
- Xyleborus undatus Schedl, 1974c^{c}
- Xyleborus undulata Sampson, 1919^{c}
- Xyleborus unimodus Beeson, 1929^{c}
- Xyleborus uniseriatus Eggers, 1936e^{c}
- Xyleborus upoluensis Schedl, 1951k^{c}
- Xyleborus urichi Sampson, 1912^{c}
- Xyleborus ursa Eggers, 1923a^{c}
- Xyleborus ursinus Hagedorn, 1908^{c}
- Xyleborus ursulus Eggers, 1923a^{c}
- Xyleborus ursus Eggers, 1923a^{c}
- Xyleborus usagaricus Eggers, 1922b^{c}
- Xyleborus usitata Schedl, 1942c^{c}
- Xyleborus usticus Wood, 1968b^{c}
- Xyleborus ustulatus Eggers (Hagedorn in), 1920^{c}
- Xyleborus ustus Schedl, 1957d^{c}
- Xyleborus vafra Schedl, 1957e^{c}
- Xyleborus vagabundus Schedl, 1948f^{c}
- Xyleborus vagans Schedl, 1977f^{c}
- Xyleborus validicornis Schedl, 1950f^{c}
- Xyleborus validus Eichhoff, 1875^{i c}
- Xyleborus vanrynae Browne, 1973a^{c}
- Xyleborus variabilis Schedl, 1948f^{c}
- Xyleborus varians Fabricius, 1801^{g}
- Xyleborus variipennis Schedl, 1971c^{c}
- Xyleborus varulus Wood, 1974a^{c}
- Xyleborus velatus Sampson, 1913^{c}
- Xyleborus venustulus Schedl, 1969b^{c}
- Xyleborus verax Schedl, 1939f^{c}
- Xyleborus vernaculus Schedl, 1975f^{c}
- Xyleborus versicolor Sampson, 1921^{c}
- Xyleborus vespatorius Schedl, 1931c^{c}
- Xyleborus vestigator Schedl, 1973e^{c}
- Xyleborus vexans Schedl, 1972g^{c}
- Xyleborus viaticus Schedl, 1974d^{c}
- Xyleborus vicarius Eichhoff, 1875^{c}
- Xyleborus vicinus LeConte, 1874a^{c}
- Xyleborus viduus Eichhoff, 1878^{i c b}
- Xyleborus vigilans Schedl, 1939f^{c}
- Xyleborus villosulus Blandford, 1898b^{c}
- Xyleborus villosus Schedl, 1948f^{c}
- Xyleborus viruensis Browne, 1984a^{c}
- Xyleborus vismiae Wood, 1974a^{c}
- Xyleborus vitiosus Schedl, 1940a^{c}
- Xyleborus voarotrae Schedl, 1961e^{c}
- Xyleborus vochysiae Kirkendall, 2006^{c}
- Xyleborus volutus Wood, 2007^{c}
- Xyleborus volvulus (Fabricius, 1775)^{i c g b}
- Xyleborus vulcanus Perkins, 1900^{i c}
- Xyleborus vulpina Schedl, 1942a^{c}
- Xyleborus wakayamensis Nobuchi, 1981d^{c}
- Xyleborus wallacei Blandford, 1896b^{c}
- Xyleborus webbi Hopkins, 1915b^{c}
- Xyleborus whitfordiodendrus Schedl, 1942a^{c}
- Xyleborus whitteni Beeson, 1935b^{c}
- Xyleborus wilderi Beeson, 1929^{c}
- Xyleborus woodi Schedl, 1979j^{c}
- Xyleborus xanthophyllus Schedl, 1942a^{c}
- Xyleborus xanthopus Eichhoff, 1868c^{c}
- Xyleborus xylocranellus Schedl, 1931c^{c}
- Xyleborus xylographus (Say, 1826)^{i c g b}
- Xyleborus xyloteroides Eggers, 1939c^{c}
- Xyleborus xylotrupes Schedl, 1962j^{c}
- Xyleborus yakushimanus Murayama, 1955^{c}
- Xyleborus zicsii Schedl, 1967e^{c}

Data sources: i = ITIS, c = Catalogue of Life, g = GBIF, b = Bugguide.net
