= Darwini =

Darwini, a New Latin adjective that commonly refers to Charles Darwin, may refer to:

- Actia darwini, a tachinid fly species
- Aniksosaurus darwini, a dinosaur species from what is now Chubut Province, Argentina
- Atropos darwini, a synonym for Trimeresurus strigatus, a venomous pitviper species from southern India
- Berthelinia darwini, a snail species found in the Houtman Abrolhos
- Boursinidia darwini, a moth species
- Bulimulus darwini, a tropical snail species
- Caerostris darwini, Darwin's bark spider
- Calantica darwini, a species of barnacle from Australia
- Calosima darwini, a species of moth
- Cancellaria darwini, a species of sea snail
- Chelonoidis darwini, a species of Galápagos tortoise
- Cryptocercus darwini, a species of cockroach found in North America
- Cyrtobill darwini, a species of spider from Australia
- Diplocynodon darwini, an extinct species of alligatoroid
- Demandasaurus darwini, the type species of a genus of rebbachisaurid sauropods that lived during the early Cretaceous
- Erechthias darwini, a species of moth
- Mylodon darwini, an extinct giant ground sloth species
- Nesoryzomys darwini, the Darwin's nesoryzomys, Darwin's rice rat or Darwin's Galápagos mouse, a rodent species
- Ogcocephalus darwini, the red-lipped batfish found in the Pacific Ocean
- Parazoanthus darwini, a cnidarian first found in the Galápagos
- Periophthalmus darwini, Darwin's mudskipper, found in Australia
- Phyllodactylus darwini, the Darwin's leaf-toed gecko, a lizard species in the genus Phyllodactylus
- Phyllotis darwini, the Darwin's leaf-eared mouse, a rodent species found in Argentina, Bolivia and Chile
- Puijila darwini, a fossil species of basal pinniped
- Semicossyphus darwini, the Galapagos sheepshead wrasse, a species of ray-finned fish native to the tropical eastern Pacific Ocean
- Senoculus darwini, a spider species found in Argentina
- Stenaelurillus darwini, a jumping spider species found in Kenya and Tanzania
- Tarentola darwini, the Darwin's wall gecko, endemic to Cape Verde
- Thecacera darwini, a sea slug species found in Chile
- Toxodon darwini, an extinct mammal species of the late Pliocene and Pleistocene epochs
- Valdiviomyia darwini, a South American species of hoverfly
- Xylocopa darwini, the Galápagos carpenter bee

== Subspecies ==
- Geochelone nigra darwini, the James Island tortoise, a subspecies in the species Geochelone nigra, the Galápagos tortoise
- Ovis ammon darwini, the Gobi argali, a subspecies in the species Ovis ammon, the argali, a wild sheep species

== See also ==
- Darwin (disambiguation)
- Darwinia (disambiguation)
- Darwinii (disambiguation)
- Darwiniothamnus
