= X. darwini =

X. darwini may refer to:

- Xyleborus darwini a bark beetle - List_of_Xyleborus_species#D
- Xylocopa darwini, the Galápagos carpenter bee, a species in the genus Xylocopa

== See also ==
- Darwini (disambiguation)
