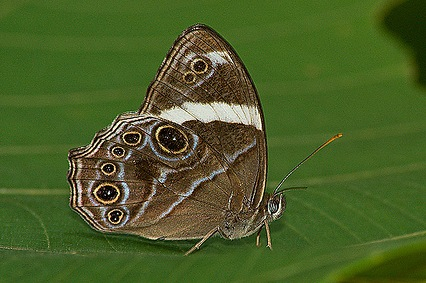
- Arunachal Pradesh, India

Scientific classification
- Kingdom: Animalia
- Phylum: Arthropoda
- Class: Insecta
- Order: Lepidoptera
- Family: Nymphalidae
- Genus: Lethe
- Species: L. confusa

Binomial name
- Lethe confusa Aurivillius, 1897

= Lethe confusa =

Banded treebrown

Species of butterfly

Lethe confusa, the banded treebrown, is a species of butterfly belonging to the satyr family that is found mainly in Southeast Asia and in parts of South Asia.

It is about 50–55 mm in expanse, with the upper surface of wings predominantly brown in colour. The forewing has a sub-apical white band and pale spot on the apex. The underside of the hindwing has a large ocellus or and a series of spots along the margin. It is found in bamboo forests.

== Description ==
Hindwing dentate at apex of vein 4. Upperside ground colour Vandyke brown; forewing crossed by an oblique, slightly curved, discal white band, the margins of the band more even and regular than in the female of Lethe rohria; beyond this are two obliquely placed preapical white spots. Hindwing uniform, ocelli of the underside showing through.

Underside uniform brown; forewings and hindwings with subbasal, subterminal and terminal sinuous lilacine-white lines; forewing with the oblique discal white bar as on the upperside, followed by a subapical lilacine patch bearing three small ocelli in vertical order, and with a very short, oblique, white bar joining it to the costa. Hindwing with a sinuous, irregular, angulated discal lilacine-white line and a strongly arched series of black ocelli speckled with white in the centre, with an inner ochraceous, intermediate brown, and outer lilacine ring. Antenna, head, thorax and abdomen dull brown; antennae ochraceous at apex. Wingspan: 54–64 mm.

Range: the Himalayas, Shimla to Sikkim, Assam into Myanmar and extending to Java.

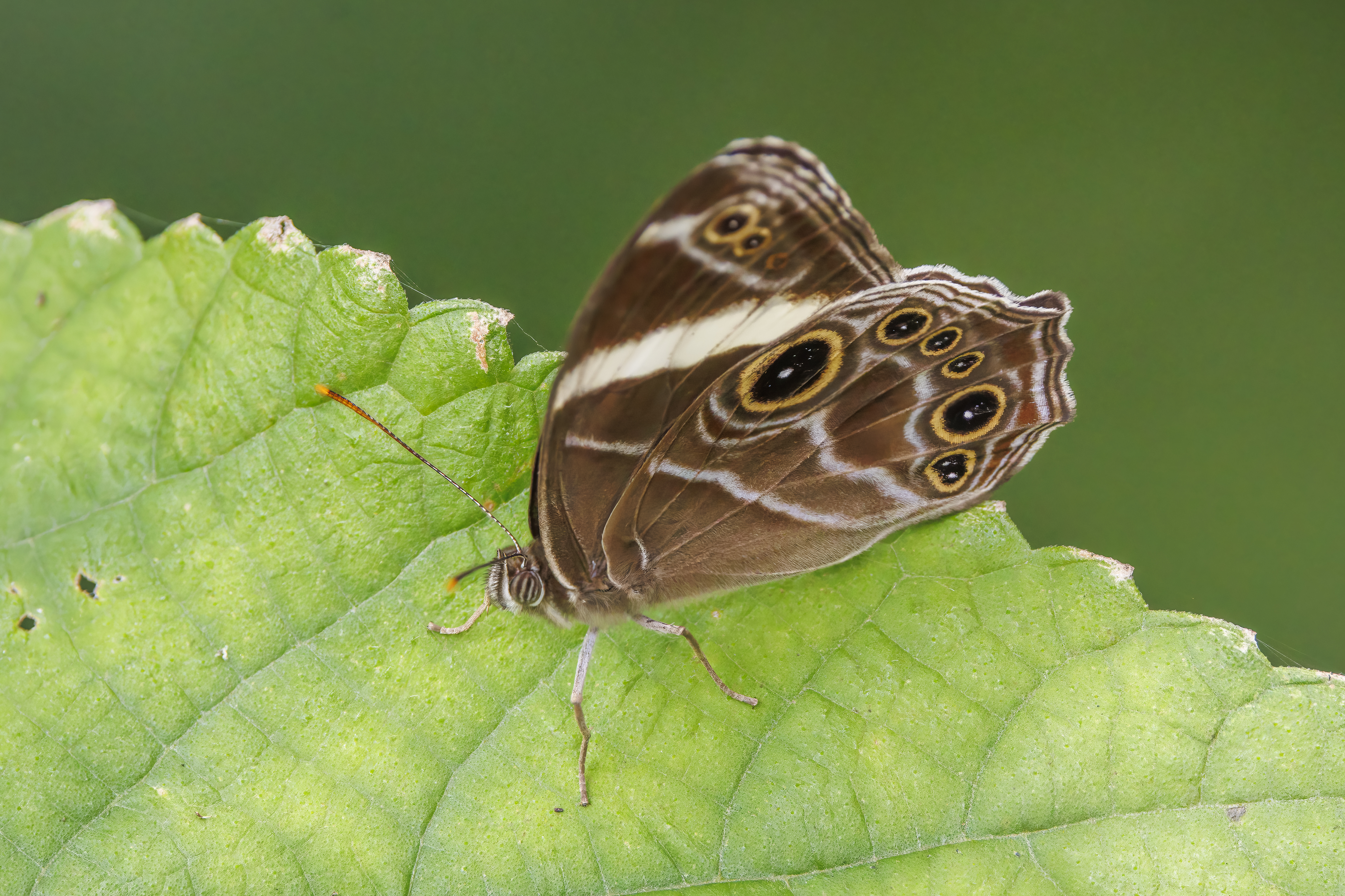
L. c. apara, Hong Kong

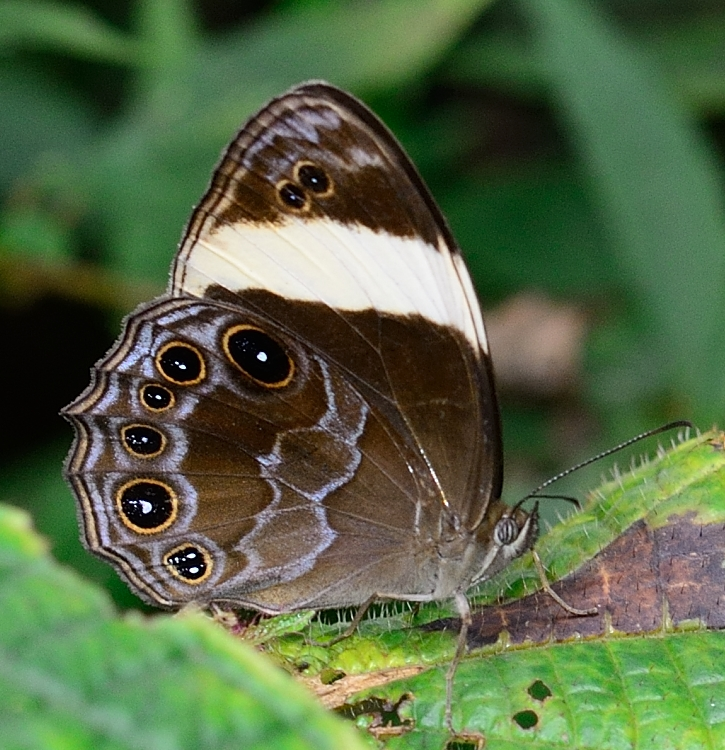
L. c. enima, Cameron Highlands, Malay Peninsula

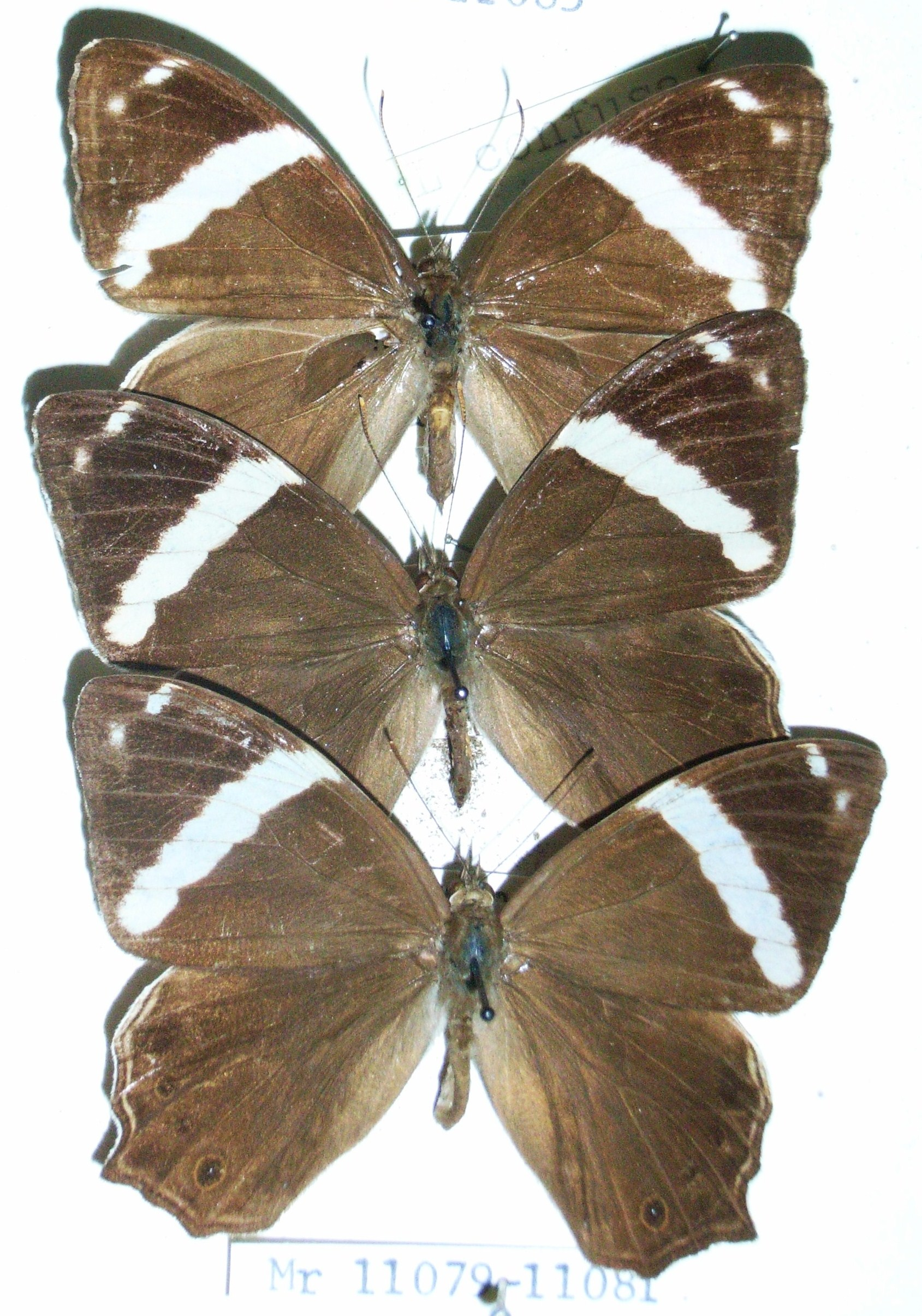
Specimens, Malay Peninsula, showing upperside
