= Calantica darwini =

Scientific classification
- Kingdom: Animalia
- Phylum: Arthropoda
- Class: Thecostraca
- Subclass: Cirripedia
- Order: Calanticomorpha
- Family: Calanticidae
- Genus: Calantica
- Species: C. darwini

Binomial name
- Calantica darwini D. S. Jones & A. M. Hosie, 2009

Species of barnacle

Calantica darwini is a species of barnacle.

It was described in 2009, the 200th anniversary of the birth of Charles Darwin, and the 150th anniversary of the publication of The Origin of Species. The specific epithet darwini was therefore chosen to commemorate Darwin who worked extensively on barnacles; ten other new species described by scientists from the Western Australian Museum were also named in honour of Darwin. The species is currently only known from the tropical waters in the northwestern part of Western Australia, where it lives attached to gorgonians.
