= Calantica (crustacean) =

Scientific classification
- Kingdom: Animalia
- Phylum: Arthropoda
- Class: Thecostraca
- Subclass: Cirripedia
- Order: Calanticomorpha
- Family: Calanticidae
- Genus: Calantica; Gray, 1825

Genus of barnacles

Calantica is a genus of barnacles in the family Calanticidae, containing the following species:

- Calantica affinis Broch, 1922
- Calantica darwini Jones & Hosie, 2009
- Calantica eos (Pilsbry, 1907)
- Calantica flagellata Ren, 1989
- Calantica gemma
- Calantica kampeni (Annandale, 1909)
- Calantica kruegeri Hiro, 1932
- Calantica pedunculostriata Broch, 1931
- Calantica pollicipedoides (Hoek, 1907)
- Calantica pusilla Utinomi, 1970
- Calantica quinquelatera Hiro, 1932
- Calantica siemensi (Weltner, 1922)
- Calantica spinosa (Quoy & Gaimard, 1834)
- Calantica studeri (Weltner, 1922)
- Calantica trispinosa (Hoek, 1883)
- Calantica villosa (Leach, 1824)
