= Valdiviomyia camrasi =

Scientific classification
- Kingdom: Animalia
- Phylum: Arthropoda
- Class: Insecta
- Order: Diptera
- Family: Syrphidae
- Subfamily: Eristalinae
- Tribe: Milesiini
- Subtribe: Temnostomina
- Genus: Valdiviomyia
- Species: V. camrasi

Binomial name
- Valdiviomyia camrasi (Sedman, 1965)

Synonyms
- Valdivia camrasi Sedman, 1965

Species of fly

Valdiviomyia camrasi is a species of Hoverfly in the family Syrphidae.

== Distribution ==
Chile.
