= Valdiviomyia valdiviana =

Scientific classification
- Kingdom: Animalia
- Phylum: Arthropoda
- Class: Insecta
- Order: Diptera
- Family: Syrphidae
- Subfamily: Eristalinae
- Tribe: Milesiini
- Subtribe: Temnostomina
- Genus: Valdiviomyia
- Species: V. valdiviana

Binomial name
- Valdiviomyia valdiviana (Philippi, 1865)

Synonyms
- Ocyptamus valdiviana Philippi, 1865; Ocyptamus albimanus Bigot, 1884

Species of fly

Valdiviomyia valdiviana is a species of hoverfly in the family Syrphidae.

== Distribution ==
Chile.
