= Valdiviomyia shannoni =

Scientific classification
- Kingdom: Animalia
- Phylum: Arthropoda
- Class: Insecta
- Order: Diptera
- Family: Syrphidae
- Subfamily: Eristalinae
- Tribe: Milesiini
- Subtribe: Temnostomina
- Genus: Valdiviomyia
- Species: V. shannoni

Binomial name
- Valdiviomyia shannoni Thompson, 2017

Synonyms
- Valdiviomyia pucara Mengual, 2017

Species of fly

Valdiviomyia shannoni is a species of Hoverfly in the family Syrphidae.

== Distribution ==
Argentina, Chile.
