= Valdiviomyia edwardsi =

Scientific classification
- Kingdom: Animalia
- Phylum: Arthropoda
- Class: Insecta
- Order: Diptera
- Family: Syrphidae
- Subfamily: Eristalinae
- Tribe: Milesiini
- Subtribe: Temnostomina
- Genus: Valdiviomyia
- Species: V. edwardsi

Binomial name
- Valdiviomyia edwardsi (Shannon & Aubertin, 1933)

Synonyms
- Valdivia edwardsi Shannon & Aubertin, 1933

Species of fly

Valdiviomyia edwardsi is a species of Hoverfly in the family Syrphidae.

== Distribution ==
Argentina.
