= Valdiviomyia =

Scientific classification
- Kingdom: Animalia
- Phylum: Arthropoda
- Class: Insecta
- Order: Diptera
- Family: Syrphidae
- Subfamily: Eristalinae
- Tribe: Milesiini
- Subtribe: Temnostomina
- Genus: Valdiviomyia; Vockeroth, 1976

Type species
- Valdivia darwini Shannon, 1927

Synonyms
- Valdivia Shannon, 1927

Genus of flies

Valdiviomyia is a genus of hoverflies from the family Syrphidae, in the order Diptera.

== Species ==
- Valdiviomyia camrasi (Sedman, 1965)
- Valdiviomyia darwini (Shannon, 1927)
- Valdiviomyia edwardsi (Shannon & Aubertin, 1933)
- Valdiviomyia gigantea Thompson, 2017
- Valdiviomyia nigra (Shannon, 1927)
- Valdiviomyia ruficauda (Shannon, 1927)
- Valdiviomyia shannoni Thompson, 2017
- Valdiviomyia valdiviana (Philippi, 1865)
