= Valdiviomyia ruficauda =

Scientific classification
- Kingdom: Animalia
- Phylum: Arthropoda
- Class: Insecta
- Order: Diptera
- Family: Syrphidae
- Subfamily: Eristalinae
- Tribe: Milesiini
- Subtribe: Temnostomina
- Genus: Valdiviomyia
- Species: V. ruficauda

Binomial name
- Valdiviomyia ruficauda Shannon, 1927

Synonyms
- Valdivia ruficauda Shannon, 1927

Species of fly

Valdiviomyia ruficauda is a species of hoverfly in the family Syrphidae. It is found in Chile.
