= Diuncus haberkorni =

Scientific classification
- Kingdom: Animalia
- Phylum: Arthropoda
- Clade: Pancrustacea
- Class: Insecta
- Order: Coleoptera
- Suborder: Polyphaga
- Infraorder: Cucujiformia
- Superfamily: Curculionoidea
- Family: Curculionidae
- Subfamily: Scolytinae
- Genus: Diuncus
- Species: D. haberkorni

Binomial name
- Diuncus haberkorni (Eggers, 1920)

Synonyms
- Xyleborus haberkorni Eggers, 1920; Orthosinus sculpticollis Motschulsky, 1863; Diuncus haberkorni (Eggers): Hulcr and Cognato, 2009; Xyleborus approximatus Schedl, 1951; Xyleborus taichuensis Schedl, 1952; Xyleborus potens Schedl, 1964

Species of beetle

Diuncus haberkorni is a species of weevil found in India, Sri Lanka, Bangladesh, Taiwan, Java, Japan, Malaysia, New Guinea, South Korea, Taiwan, Thailand, and Vietnam. It is also imported to African countried such as South Africa, and Tanzania.

== Description ==
Body length is about 1.9 to 2.8 mm. The elytral summit is armed by two pairs of large denticles. Pronotum as long as wide where the basal half is punctate. Elytral declivity weakly bisulcate. Elytral interstriae 1, 3 to 6 are flat to weakly convex. This gives the finely sculptured appearance for the declivity.

A polyphagous species, it is found from many host plants.

=== Host plants ===
- Artocarpus dadah
- Coffea liberica
- Dalbergia latifolia
- Gluta curtisii
- Eugenia jambolana
- Falcataria moluccana
- Mangifera indica
- Neolitsea konishii
- Parkia speciosa
- Piper
- Rubroshorea ovata
- Salix tetrasperma
- Shorea maxwelliana
- Shorea robusta
- Swietenia mahagoni
- Tectona grandis
- Terminalia myriocarpa
- Theobroma cacao
- Toona sinensis
- Tristania whiteana
- Turpinia pomifera
- Vitex pubescens
- Zelkova serrata
