= Valdiviomyia gigantea =

Scientific classification
- Kingdom: Animalia
- Phylum: Arthropoda
- Class: Insecta
- Order: Diptera
- Family: Syrphidae
- Subfamily: Eristalinae
- Tribe: Milesiini
- Subtribe: Temnostomina
- Genus: Valdiviomyia
- Species: V. gigantea

Binomial name
- Valdiviomyia gigantea Thompson, 2017

Species of fly

Valdiviomyia gigantea is a species of hoverfly in the family Syrphidae.

== Distribution ==
Chile.
