= Valdiviomyia nigra =

Scientific classification
- Kingdom: Animalia
- Phylum: Arthropoda
- Class: Insecta
- Order: Diptera
- Family: Syrphidae
- Subfamily: Eristalinae
- Tribe: Milesiini
- Subtribe: Temnostomina
- Genus: Valdiviomyia
- Species: V. nigra

Binomial name
- Valdiviomyia nigra Shannon, 1927

Synonyms
- Valdivia nigra Shannon, 1927

Species of fly

Valdiviomyia nigra is a species of Hoverfly in the family Syrphidae.

== Distribution ==
Chile.
