= Scillaelepas =

Scientific classification
- Kingdom: Animalia
- Phylum: Arthropoda
- Class: Thecostraca
- Subclass: Cirripedia
- Order: Calanticomorpha
- Family: Calanticidae
- Genus: Scillaelepas; Seguenza, 1872

Species
- Scillaelepas brasiliensis Young, 1999; Scillaelepas fosteri Newman, 1980; Scillaelepas gemma (Aurivillius, 1894); Scillaelepas grimaldii (Aurivillius, 1898); Scillaelepas superba (Pilsbry, 1907)

Genus of crustaceans

Scillaelepas is a genus of barnacle. Most of the species in the genus are androdioecious and the genus dates back to the Upper Jurassic period.
