= Darwinia =

Darwinia may refer to:

- Darwinia (plant) Rudge 1815, a genus of Myrtaceae found only in Australia
- Darwinia Raf., a synonym of the legume genus Sesbania Adans.
- Darwinia (video game), a 2005 video game by Introversion Software
- Darwinia (novel), a 1998 novel by Robert Charles Wilson

== See also ==
- Darwinius, an extinct primate
