= Carl Wilhelm Samuel Aurivillius =

Swedish biologist

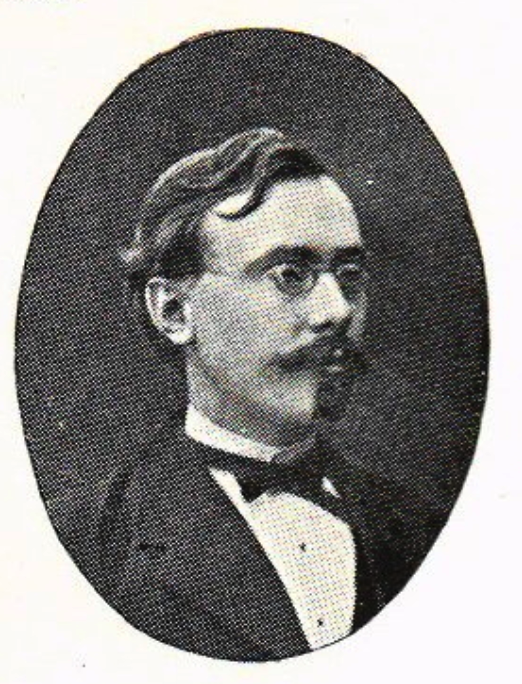
Carl Wilhelm's portrait

Carl Wilhelm Samuel Aurivillius (31 August 1854 in the parish of Forsa, today part of Hudiksvall Municipality – 1899) was a Swedish planktologist and carcinologist. He was the brother of entomologist Per Olof Christopher Aurivillius (1853–1928).

Beginning in 1872 he studied zoology at the University of Uppsala, receiving his doctorate in 1883. Later on, he worked as a lecturer of zoology at the university. From 1893 he was a member of the Svenska Hydrografiska Kommissionen (Swedish Hydrographic Commission).

He is remembered for his studies of plankton found in the Arctic Ocean and in waters around Sweden. The genus Aurivillialepas (family Calanticidae) commemorates his name, as do the barnacle species Oxynaspis aurivillii (Stebbing, 1900) and Amigdoscalpellum aurivillii (Pilsbry, 1907).

== Selected works ==
- Bidrag till kännedomen om krustaceer som lefva hos mollusker och tunikater : akademisk afhandling, som med tillstånd af vidtberömda filosofiska fakultetens i Upsala, 1883 – Contributions to the knowledge of crustaceans that live in mollusks and tunicates.
- Über Symbiose als Grund accessorischer Bildungen bei marinen Gastropodengehäusen, 1891.
- Die beziehungen der sinnesorgane Amphibischer dekapoden zur lebensweise und athmung : eine vergleichend biologisch-morphologische Studie, 1893 – On the sensory organs of amphibious decapods in regards to behavior and respiration: a comparative bio-morphological study.
- Studien über Cirripeden, 1894 – Studies of cirripedes.
- Das plankton des baltischen Meeres, 1896 – Plankton of the Baltic Sea.
- Vergleichende thiergeographische Untersuchungen über die Plankton-fauna des Skageraks in den Jahren 1893-1897, (1898) – Comparative zoogeographical studies of plankton fauna from Skagerrak in the years 1893 to 1897.
- Animalisches Plankton aus dem Meere zwischen Jan Mayen, Spitzbergen, K. Karls Land und der Nordkuste Norwegens, 1899 – Zoological plankton from the sea between Jan Mayen, Spitzbergen, Kong Karls Land and the north coast of Norway.
