= Debus emarginatus =

Scientific classification
- Kingdom: Animalia
- Phylum: Arthropoda
- Clade: Pancrustacea
- Class: Insecta
- Order: Coleoptera
- Suborder: Polyphaga
- Infraorder: Cucujiformia
- Family: Curculionidae
- Genus: Debus
- Species: D. emarginatus

Binomial name
- Debus emarginatus (Eichhoff, 1878)

Synonyms
- Xyleborus emarginatus Eichhoff 1878; Xyleborus exesus Blandford, 1894; Xyleborus chinchonae Veen, 1897; Xyleborus cordatus Hagedorn, 1910; Coptoborus palmeri Hopkins, 1915; Coptoborus terminaliae Hopkins, 1915; Xyleborus emarginatus semicircularis Schedl, 1973; Xyleborus terminaliea Hopkins, 1915; Coptoborus terminaliae (Hopkins) Wood and Bright, 1992; Xyleborus exesus Blandford, 1894; Xyleborus palmeri Hopkins, 1915; Coptoborus palmeri (Hopkins): Wood & Bright, 1992

Species of beetle

Debus emarginatus is a species of weevil widely distributed throughout the Old World tropics.

== Distribution ==
It is native to China, India, Sri Lanka, Indonesia, Japan, Laos, Malaysia, Myanmar, Philippines, South Korea, Thailand, Vietnam, Australia, Papua New Guinea and Solomon Islands.

== Description ==
The average length of the species is about 3.3 to 3.6 mm. The postero-lateral extensions of elytra are short, and less than the width of apical emargination. The declivity is shallowly excavated. Elytral declivity clearly, confusedly punctate.

=== Host plants ===
A polyphagous pest, it is found from many host plants.

- Abies fabri
- Azfelia palembanica
- Castanea argentea
- Castanopsis
- Cinchona
- Cyrtophyllum giganteum
- Dipterocarpus baudii
- Durio zibethinus
- Falcataria moluccana
- Ficus
- Koompassia excelsa
- Mangifera foetida
- Neobalanocarpus heimii
- Palaquium
- Pinus tabulaeformis
- Pinus yunnanensis
- Populus
- Quercus
- Rubroshorea leprosula
- Sarcocephalus cordatus
- Symplocos
- Terminalia

== Control ==
It is a high-risk quarantine pest where they show inbreeding, with the males generally mating with their sisters within the parental gallery system before dispersal. Adult beetle does not actually feed on the plant material but uses it as a medium for growing the fungus which is the larval food. They are mostly found in felled timber. Attacked plants show signs of wilting, branch die-back, shoot breakage, chronic debilitation, sun-scorch or a general decline in vigour.
