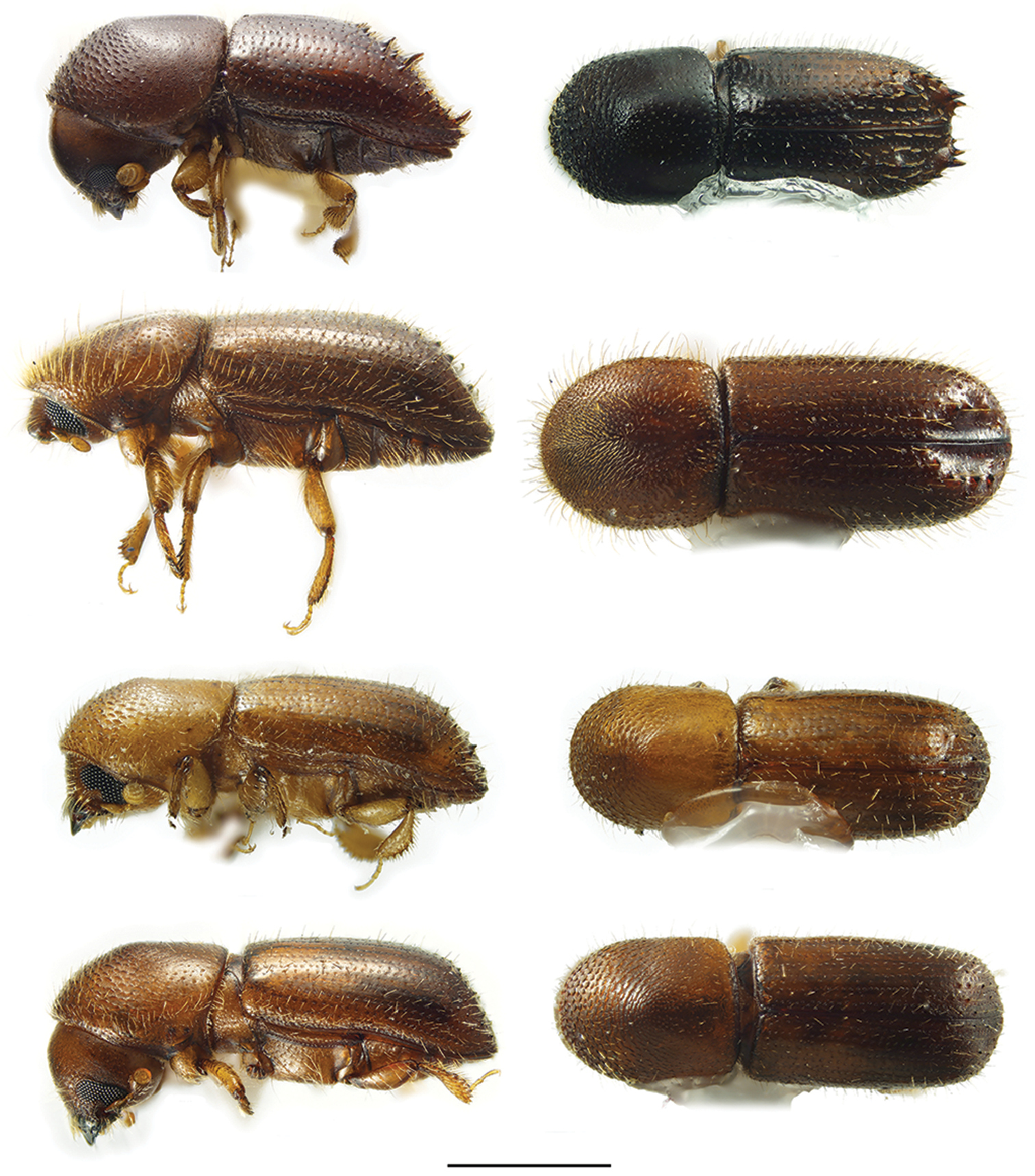
- Xyleborus sp. Xyleborus spinulosus is pictured at the top

Scientific classification
- Kingdom: Animalia
- Phylum: Arthropoda
- Clade: Pancrustacea
- Class: Insecta
- Order: Coleoptera
- Suborder: Polyphaga
- Infraorder: Cucujiformia
- Family: Curculionidae
- Genus: Xyleborus
- Species: X. spinulosus

Binomial name
- Xyleborus spinulosus Blandford, 1898

= Xyleborus spinulosus =

Species of beetle

Xyleborus spinulosus is a species of typical bark beetle in the family Curculionidae.
