= Salix tetrasperma =

- Indian Willow blooming in Delhi.

Conservation status
- Least Concern (IUCN 3.1)

Scientific classification
- Kingdom: Plantae
- Clade: Tracheophytes
- Clade: Angiosperms
- Clade: Eudicots
- Clade: Rosids
- Order: Malpighiales
- Family: Salicaceae
- Genus: Salix
- Species: S. tetrasperma

Binomial name
- Salix tetrasperma Roxb.

Synonyms
- Salix apiculata Andersson; Salix araeostachya C.K.Schneid.; Salix azaolana Blanco; Salix boseensis N.Chao; Salix cuspidata D.Don; Salix horsfieldiana Miq.; Salix ichnostachya Lindl. ex Andersson; Salix javanica Andersson; Salix nilagirica Miq.; Salix nobilis Fr.; Salix pyrina Wall. ex Andersson; Salix suaveolens Andersson; Salix sumatrana Miq.; Salix zollingeriana Miq.

Species of willow

Salix tetrasperma, commonly called Indian willow, is a medium-sized tree of wet and swampy places, shedding its leaves at the end of monsoon season. It flowers after leafing. The bark is rough, with deep, vertical fissures and the young shoots leaves are silky. The leaves are lance-like, or ovate-lancelike, 8–15 cm long, with minutely and regularly toothed margins. The male sweet scented catkins are 5–10 cm long, and are borne on leafy branchlets. The female catkins are 8–12 cm long. The capsules are long, stipulate, in groups of 3 to 4.

It grows in many parts of south and southeastern Asia, including India, Pakistan, Bangladesh, Nepal, Laos, and Thailand.

In Manipur, in NE India, the new flowers of Indian willow, locally known as ঊযুম (ooyum) are eaten, and are considered delicious. In Maharashtra, this tree is called walunj. It can be found in Pune, Satara, Sangli, and Kolhapur. In Nepal, it is called Bainsa (बैँस).

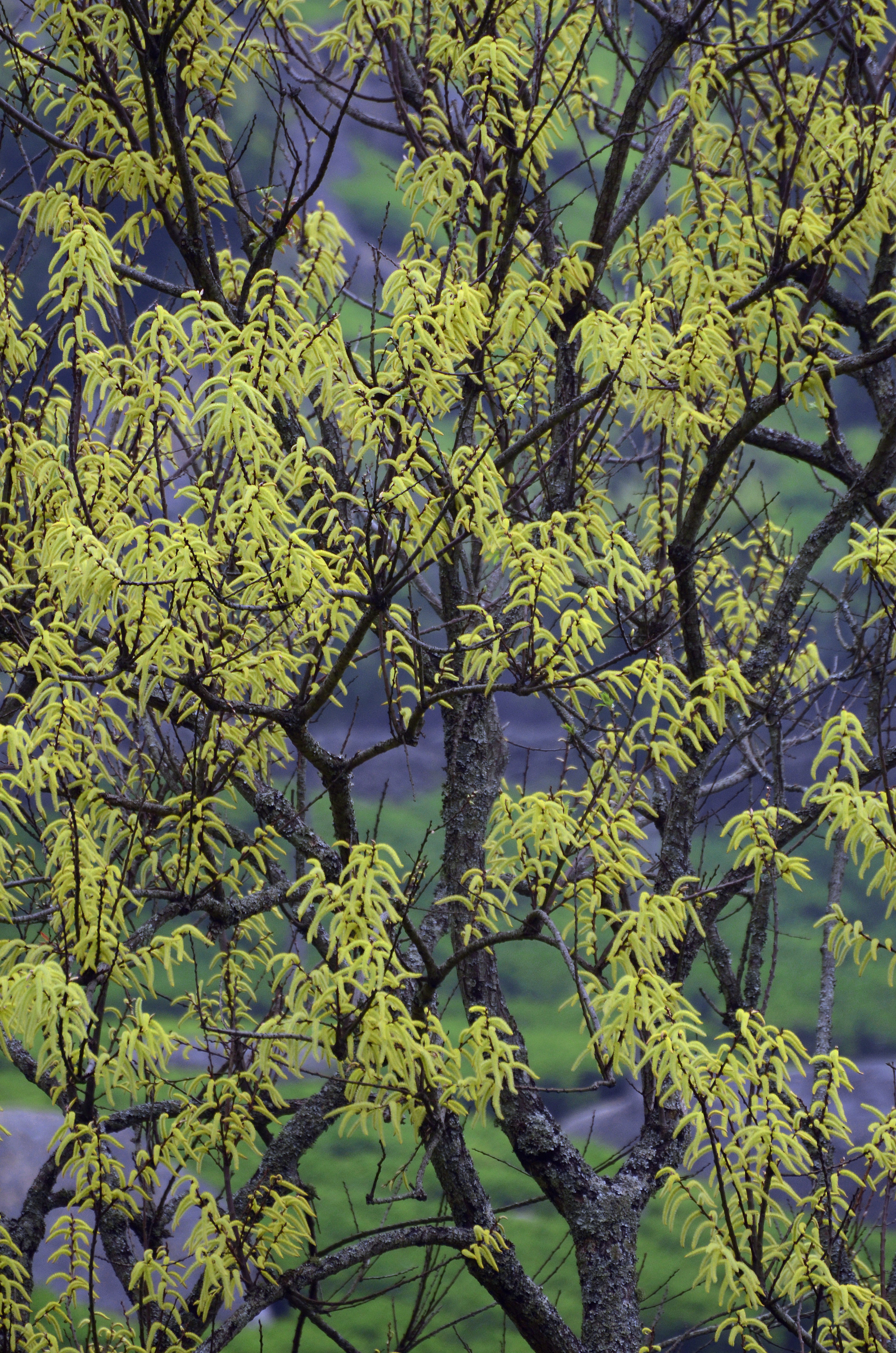
Male S. tetrasperma in full bloom
