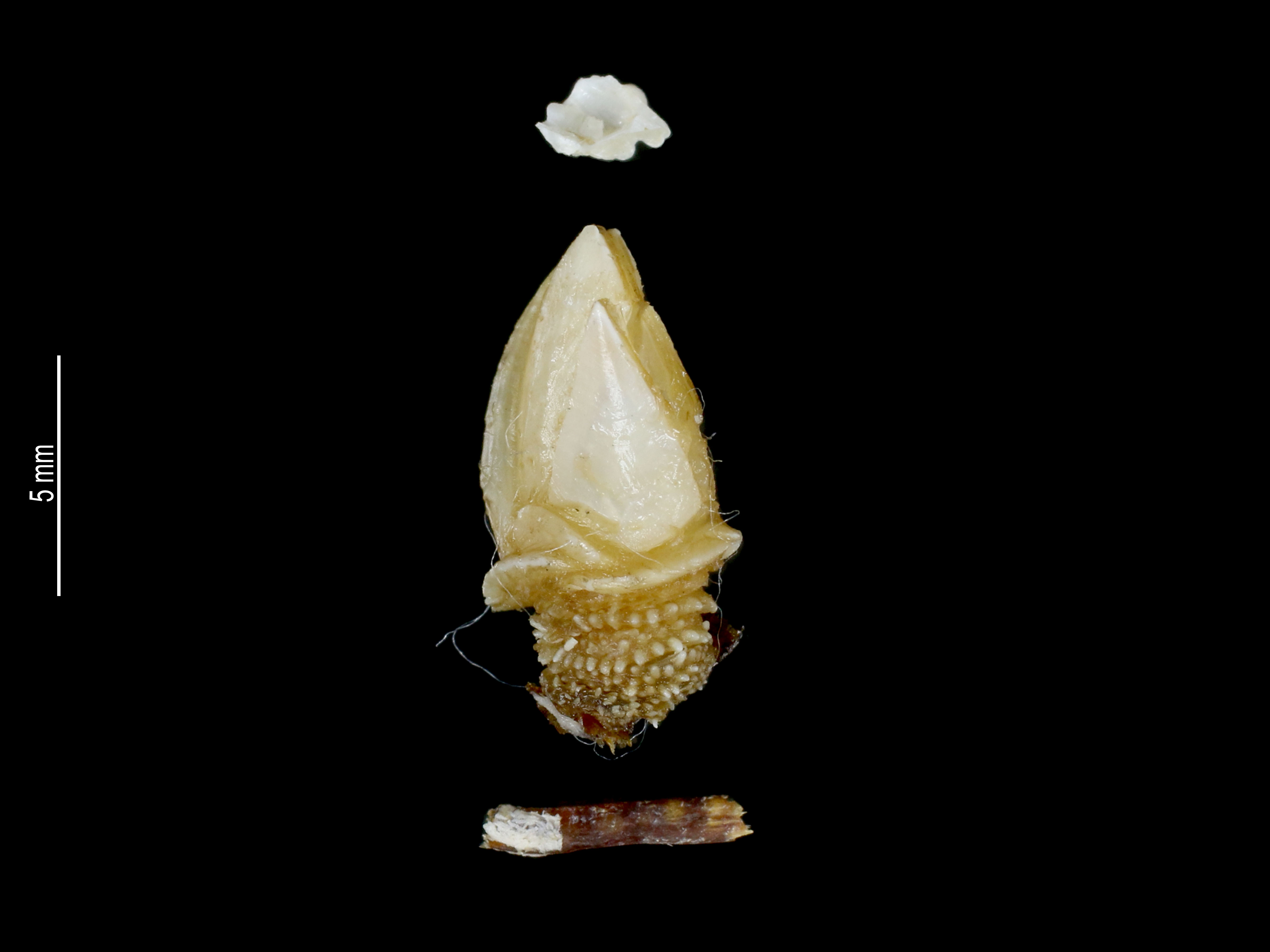
- Calantica graphica

Scientific classification
- Kingdom: Animalia
- Phylum: Arthropoda
- Class: Thecostraca
- Subclass: Cirripedia
- Infraclass: Thoracica
- Superorder: Thoracicalcarea
- Order: Calanticomorpha; Chan et al., 2021

= Calanticomorpha =

Order of acorn barnacles

Calanticomorpha is an order of acorn barnacles in the class Thecostraca. There are 3 families and more than 90 described species in Calanticomorpha.

== Families ==
These families and genera belong to the order Calanticomorpha:

Order Calanticomorpha Chan et al., 2021

Family Calanticidae Zevina, 1978

Genus Aurivillialepas Newman, 1980
Genus Calantica Gray, 1825
Genus Crosnieriella Jones, 1998
Genus Euscalpellum Hoek, 1907
Genus Gruvelialepas Newman, 1980
Genus Newmanilepas Zevina & Yakhontova, 1987
Genus Paracalantica (Utinomi, 1949)
Genus Pisiscalpellum Utinomi, 1958
Genus Scillaelepas Seguenza, 1872
Genus Smilium Gray, 1825
Genus †Pachyscalpellum Buckeridge, 1991
Genus †Zeascalpellum Buckeridge, 1983

Family †Cretiscalpellidae Buckeridge, 1983

Genus †Cretiscalpellum Withers, 1922
Genus †Jagtscalpellum Gale, 2020
Genus †Striascalpellum Gale, 2020
Genus †Witherscalpellum Gale, 2020

Family †Titanolepadidae Gale & Sørensen, 2015

Genus †Ivoelepas Gale & Sørensen, 2015
Genus †Levelepas Gale & Sørensen, 2015
Genus †Titanolepas Withers, 1913
