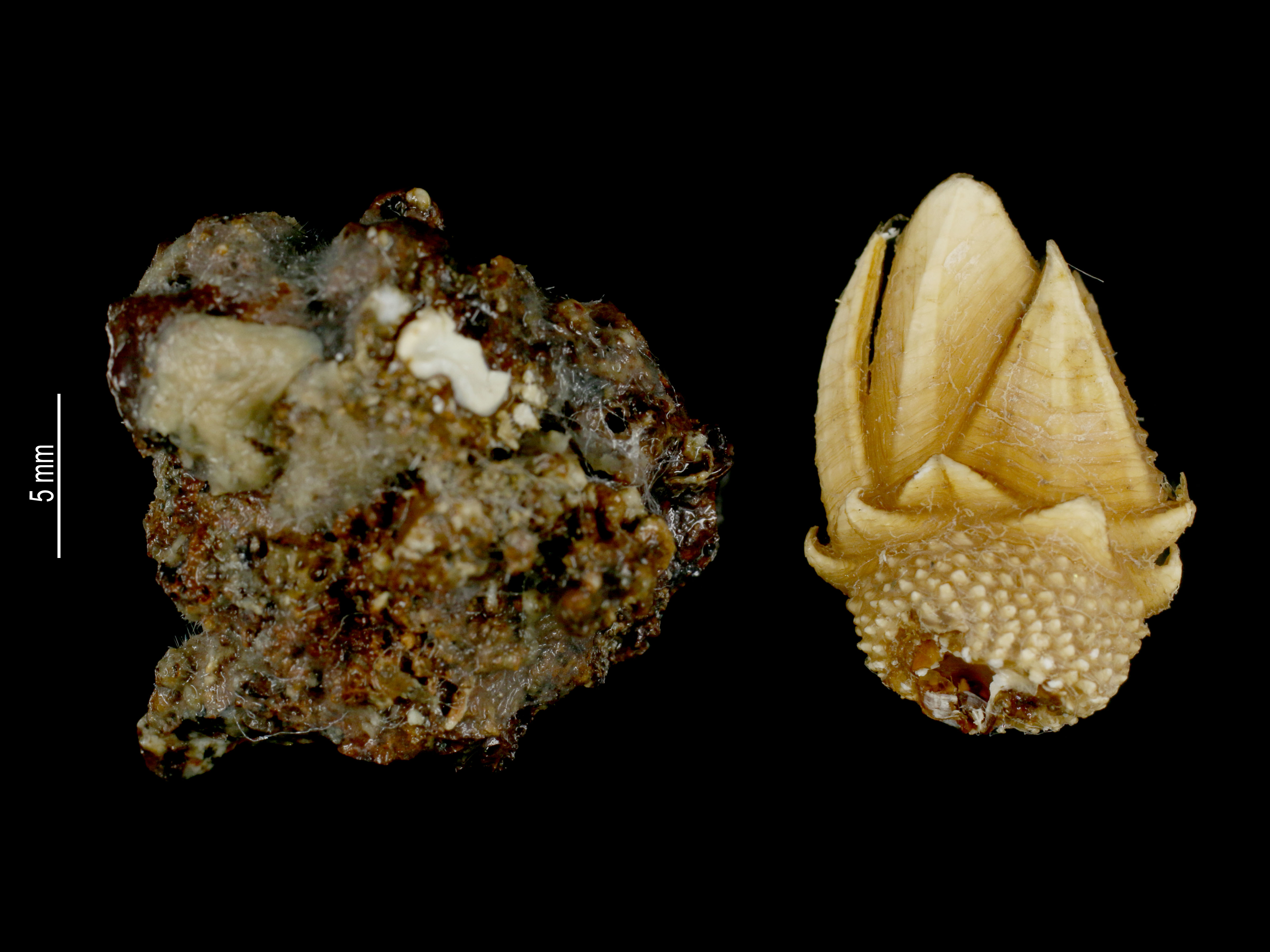
- Aurivillialepas bocquetae (holotype at MNHN, Paris)

Scientific classification
- Kingdom: Animalia
- Phylum: Arthropoda
- Class: Thecostraca
- Subclass: Cirripedia
- Order: Calanticomorpha
- Family: Calanticidae; Zevina, 1978

= Calanticidae =

Family of barnacles

Calanticidae is a family of acorn barnacles in the order Calanticomorpha. There are about 12 genera and more than 60 described species in Calanticidae.

== Genera ==
These genera belong to the family Calanticidae:

- Aurivillialepas Newman, 1980
- Calantica Gray, 1825
- Crosnieriella Jones, 1998
- Euscalpellum Hoek, 1907
- Gruvelialepas Newman, 1980
- Newmanilepas Zevina & Yakhontova, 1987
- Paracalantica (Utinomi, 1949)
- Pisiscalpellum Utinomi, 1958
- Scillaelepas Seguenza, 1872
- Smilium Gray, 1825
- † Pachyscalpellum Buckeridge, 1991
- † Zeascalpellum Buckeridge, 1983
