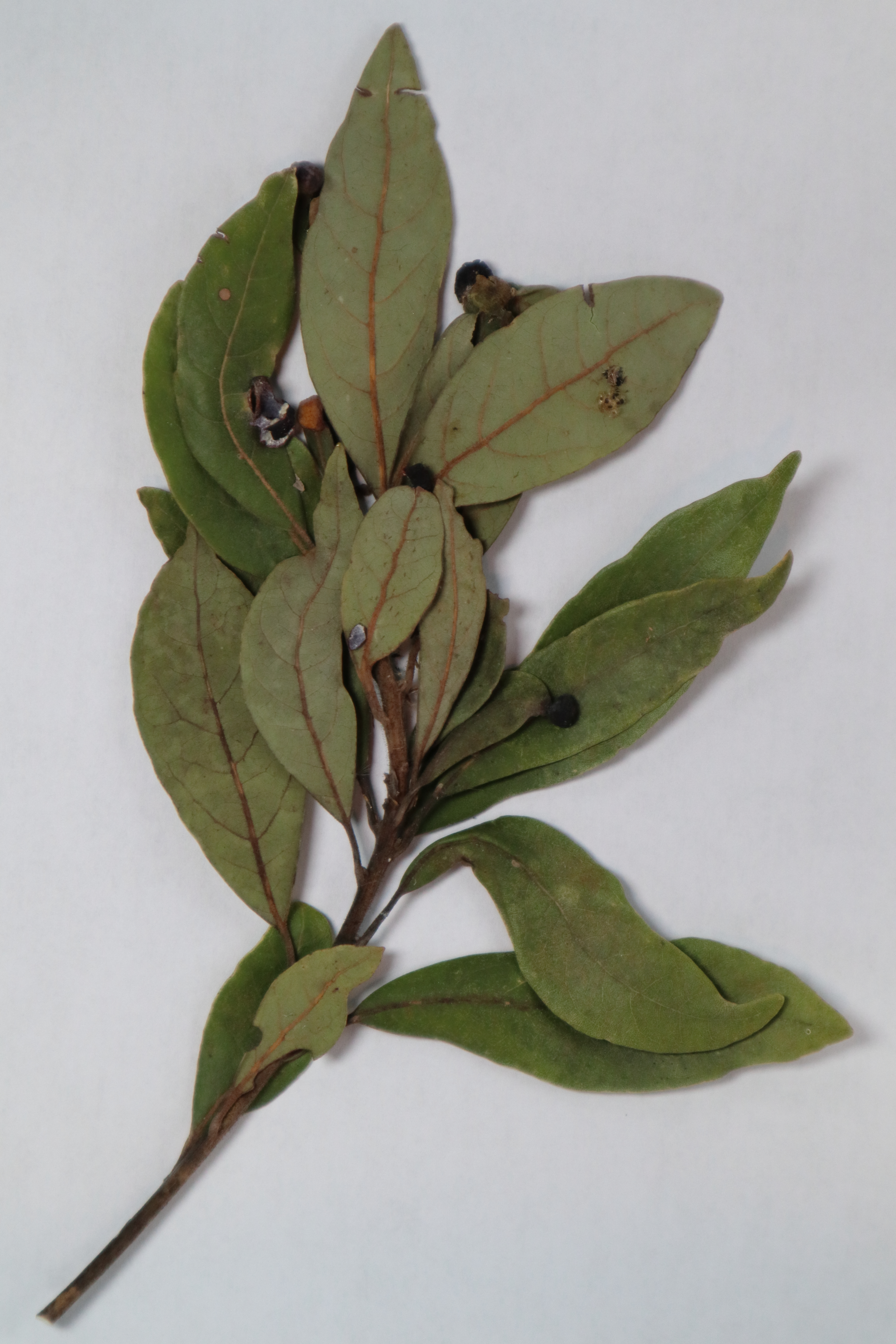

Scientific classification
- Domain: Eukaryota
- Kingdom: Fungi
- Division: Ascomycota
- Class: Sordariomycetes
- Order: Ophiostomatales
- Family: Ophiostomataceae
- Genus: Raffaelea; Arx & Hennebert (1965)

Type species
- Raffaelea ambrosiae Arx & Hennebert (1965)

= Raffaelea =

Genus of fungi

Raffaelea is a genus of ambrosia fungi in the family Ophiostomataceae. It was circumscribed by mycologists Josef Adolph von Arx and Grégoire L. Hennebert in 1965 with Raffaelea ambrosiae as the type species. The genus is named in honor of Italian botanist Raffaele Ciferri.

Laurel wilt is a disease of redbay (Persea borbonia) caused by Raffaelea lauricola. This fungus, harbored in the mycangium of the redbay ambrosia beetle Xyleborus glabratus, is in the form of a budding yeast in the mycangium and a filamentous fungus in galleries of the beetle. Several species also resident in the beetle were described as new to science in 2010: R. ellipticospora, R. fusca, R. subalba, and R. subfusca.

== Species ==
As accepted by Species Fungorum;

- Raffaelea aguacate D.R. Simmons, Dreaden & R.C. Ploetz (2016)
- Raffaelea albimanens D.B. Scott & J.W. du Toit (1970)
- Raffaelea amasae (Gebhardt) T.C. Harr. (2010)
- Raffaelea ambrosiae Arx & Hennebert (1965)
- Raffaelea arxii D.B. Scott & J.W. du Toit (1970)
- Raffaelea barbata (Ellis & Everh.) D. Hawksw. (1979)
- Raffaelea borbonica M. Procter, M.J. Wingf. & Marinc. (2020)
- Raffaelea brunnea (L.R. Batra) T.C. Harr. (2010)
- Raffaelea campbelliorum D.R. Simmons, A. Campb. & R.C. Ploetz (2016)
- Raffaelea canadensis L.R. Batra (1968)
- Raffaelea castellanii (Pinoy) de Hoog (1974)
- Raffaelea crossotarsi D.R. Simmons & Y.T. Huang (2016)
- Raffaelea cyclorhipidii D.R. Simmons & Y.T. Huang (2016)
- Raffaelea deltoideospora (Olchow. & J. Reid) Z.W. de Beer & T.A. Duong (2015)
- Raffaelea ellipticospora T.C. Harr., Aghayeva & Fraedrich (2010)
- Raffaelea fusca T.C. Harr., Aghayeva & Fraedrich (2010)
- Raffaelea gnathotrichi (L.R. Batra) T.C. Harr. (2010)
- Raffaelea hennebertii D.B. Scott & J.W. du Toit (1970)
- Raffaelea lauricola T.C. Harr., Fraedrich & Aghayeva (2008)
- Raffaelea montetyi M. Morelet (1998)
- Raffaelea promiscua W.J. Nel (2021)
- Raffaelea quercina M.L. Inácio, E. Sousa & F. Nóbrega (2021)
- Raffaelea quercivora Kubono & Shin. Ito (2002)
- Raffaelea quercus-mongolicae K.H. Kim, Y.J. Choi & H.D. Shin (2009)
- Raffaelea rapaneae Musvuugwa, Z.W. de Beer, Dreyer & Roets (2015)
- Raffaelea santoroi Guerrero (1966)
- Raffaelea scolytodis M. Kolařík (2009)
- Raffaelea seticollis (R.W. Davidson) Z.W. de Beer & T.A. Duong (2015)
- Raffaelea subalba T.C. Harr., Aghayeva & Fraedrich (2010)
- Raffaelea subfusca T.C. Harr., Aghayeva & Fraedrich (2010)
- Raffaelea sulcati A. Funk (1970)
- Raffaelea sulphurea (L.R. Batra) T.C. Harr. (2010)
- Raffaelea tritirachium L.R. Batra (1968)
- Raffaelea vaginata Musvuugwa, Z.W. de Beer, Dreyer & Roets (2015)
- Raffaelea variabilis B. Sutton (1975)
- Raffaelea xyleborini D.R. Simmons & C.C. Bateman (2016)
