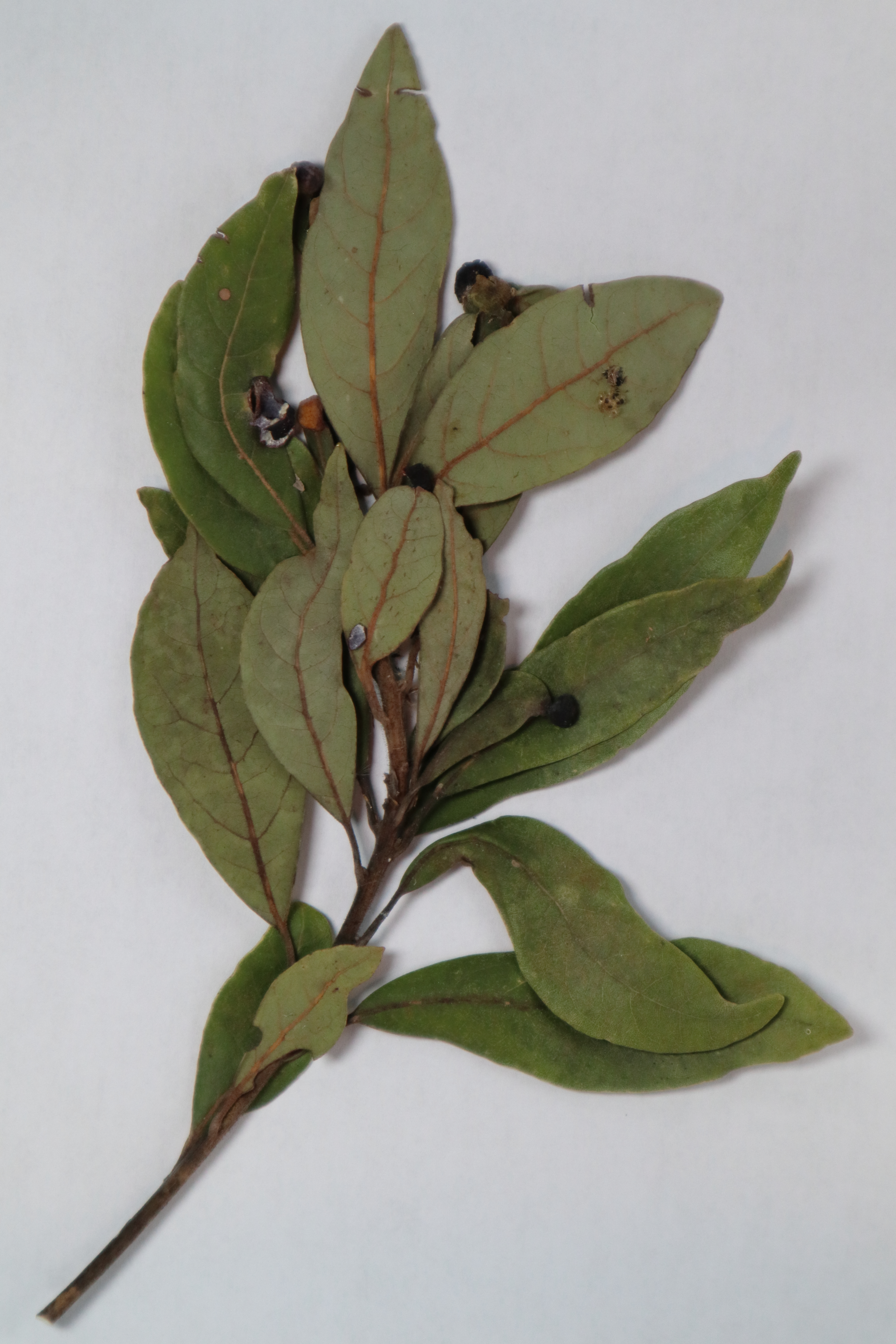
- Harringtonia lauricola on Tamala palustris

Scientific classification
- Kingdom: Fungi
- Division: Ascomycota
- Class: Sordariomycetes
- Order: Ophiostomatales
- Genus: Harringtonia
- Species: H. lauricola

Binomial name
- Harringtonia lauricola (T.C. Harr., Fraedrich & Aghayeva) Z.W. de Beer & M. Procter

Synonyms
- Raffaelea lauricola T.C. Harr., Fraedrich & Aghayeva

= Harringtonia lauricola =

Genus of fungi

Harringtonia lauricola is an obligate nutritional fungal symbiont of the redbay ambrosia beetle (Xyleborus glabratus), which is native to Asia, and a pathogen of living woody laurel plants (Lauraceae) in the southeastern United States, such as redbay (Tamala borbonia), swampbay (Tamala palustris), sassafras (Sassafras albidum), and avocado (Persea americana). The disease associated with Harringtonia lauricola infection is called laurel wilt, and is characterized by drought-like response symptoms such as canopy wilting and die-back. Laurel wilt endangers the U.S. avocado industry due to its rapid spread throughout impacted groves, partially due to X. glabratus attration to stressed trees and partially due to root graft transmission from infected trees and non-infected trees. The most effective methods for controlling Harringtonia lauricola are preventative. Management strategies include maintaining healthy laurel trees and complete uprooting, chipping, and removal of any infected trees or wood material. Climate change and international exchange of wood materials increase the risk of spreading Harringtonia lauricola to neighboring countries, such as Mexico, thus putting their multibillion dollar avocado industry at risk.

== Taxonomy ==
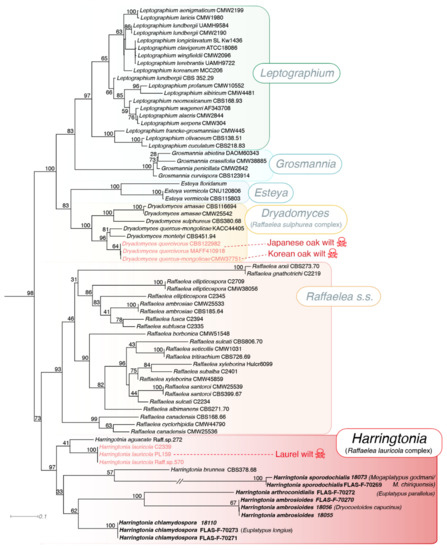
Description: Maximum likelihood tree obtained from RAxML analysis of concatenated dataset composed by LSU, ITS and ß-Tubulin of ophiostomatalean species.

The current name for this fungus is Harringtonia lauricola (T.C. Harr., Fraedrich & Aghayeva) Z.W. de Beer & M. Procter, Stud. Mycol. 101: 93 (2022) [MB#840401]. Its basionym, or original name, is Raffaelea lauricola T.C. Harr., Fraedrich & Aghayeva, Mycotaxon 104: 401 (2008) [MB#511590]. There are no other synonyms for this fungus.

=== Classification ===
Harringtonia lauricola belongs to the kingdom Fungi, subkingdom Dikarya, phylum Ascomycota, subphylum Pezizomycotina, class Sordariomycetes, subclass Sordariomycetidae, order Ophiostomatales, family Ophiostomataceae, genus Harringtonia, and species Harringtonia lauricola.

=== Phylogenetics ===
Harringtonia lauricola gained its current name in 2022 when molecular data prompted taxonomic revision of the order Ophiostomatales, a previous catch-all order for ambrosia fungi.

There are three monophyletic clades in what used to be considered just Raffaelea alone: Dryadomyces, Raffaelea, and Harringtonia. Harringtonia lauricola belongs to the Harringtonia clade. The closest known relative of Harringtonia lauricola is Harringtonia aguacate, which is not pathogenic to laurels but does live in swampbay. Harringtonia brunnea also resides in this clade, and is minimally pathogenic to laurels. Together, Harringtonia lauricola, Harringtonia aguacate, and Harringtonia brunnea make up what used to be referred to as the Raffaelea lauricola complex.

Four new species of Harringtonia, which are also carried by ambrosia beetles, were discovered and named in 2022 and investigated for potential pathogenicity in laurels: Harringtonia chlamydospora, Harringtonia arthroconidialis, Harringtonia ambrosioides, and Harringtonia sporodochialis. None of these new species were proven pathogenic to laurels.

== Morphology ==
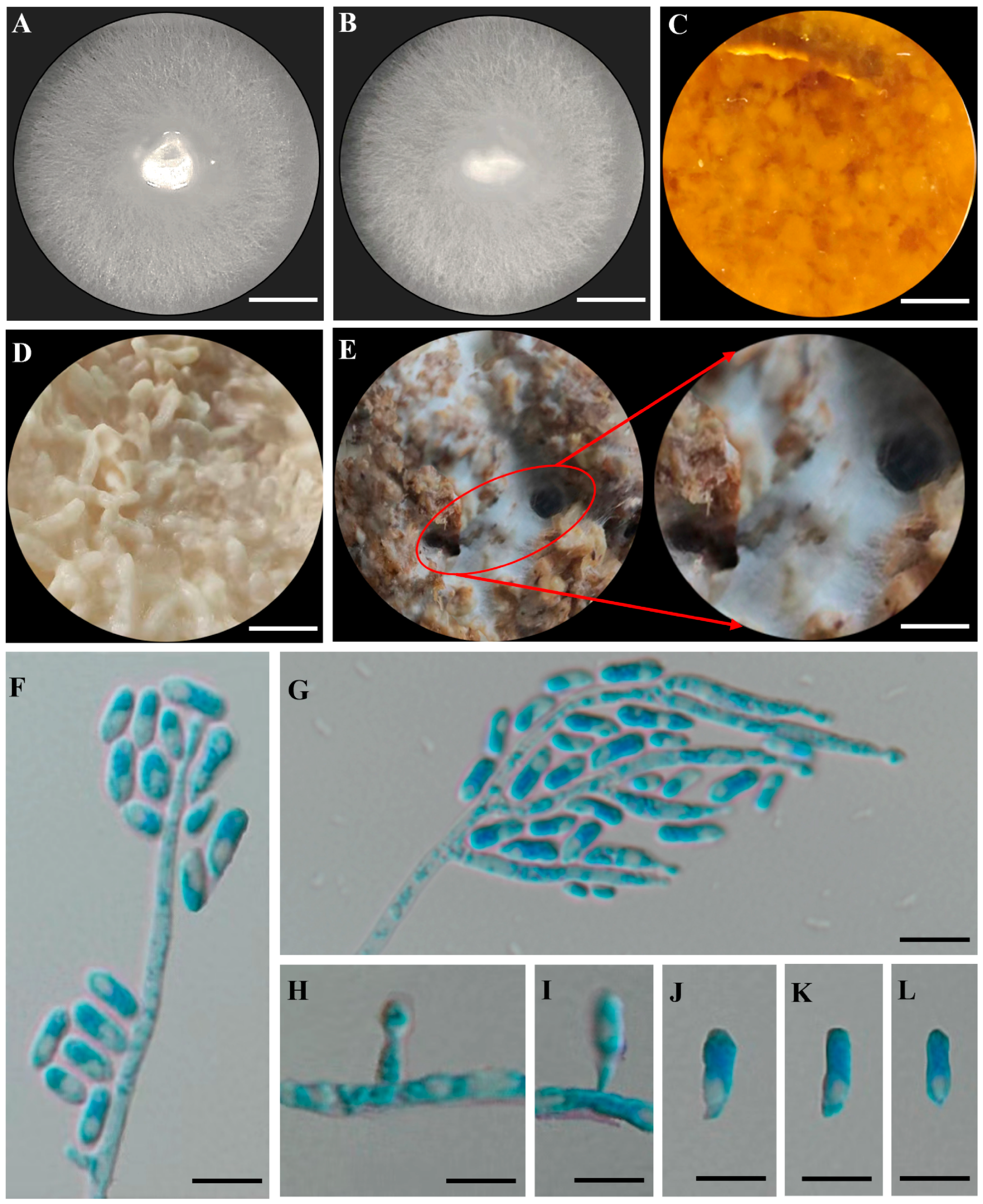
Morphological characteristics of Harringtonia lauricola

Harringtonia lauricola can be isolated from Xyleborus glabratus, an ambrosia beetle whose females carry fungal spores inside tiny, specialized organs called mycangia beneath their mandibles, then cultured on sterile plates of potato dextrose agar (PDA). When first inoculated, fungal colonies appear wet with smooth, light gray hyphae submerged in the media. As colonies continue to grow, aerial off-white mycelia emerge, with the plate reaching full capacity at around 10 days. Under the microscope, conidiophores appear very small, ovoid, and smooth.

== Distribution & ecology ==
=== Distribution ===
Harringtonia lauricola is an obligate nutritional symbiont of the ambrosia beetle Xyleborus glabratus. X. glabratus is native to Asia, and was likely introduced to the United States in 2002 when it was first intercepted in Savannah, Georgia in infected wood packing materials.

The native distribution of Harringtonia lauricola includes the countries of Bangladesh, China, India, Japan, Myanmar, South Korea, Taiwan, Thailand, and Vietnam. In its non-native range, H. lauricola has spread throughout the southeastern United States, including the states of Alabama, Arkansas, Florida, Georgia, Kentucky, Louisiana, Mississippi, North Carolina, South Carolina, Tennessee, Texas, Virginia.

=== Ecology ===
Xyleborus glabratus are haplodiploid and participate in inbreeding. This means that female X. glabratus often mate with their brothers, then fly off to make new galleries in which to lay their eggs. Due to haplodiploidy, fertilized X. glabratus eggs become female, while unfertilized eggs become male. Therefore, it is feasible that a single female X. glabratus carrying Harringtonia lauricola spores could have established the entire existing U.S. population.

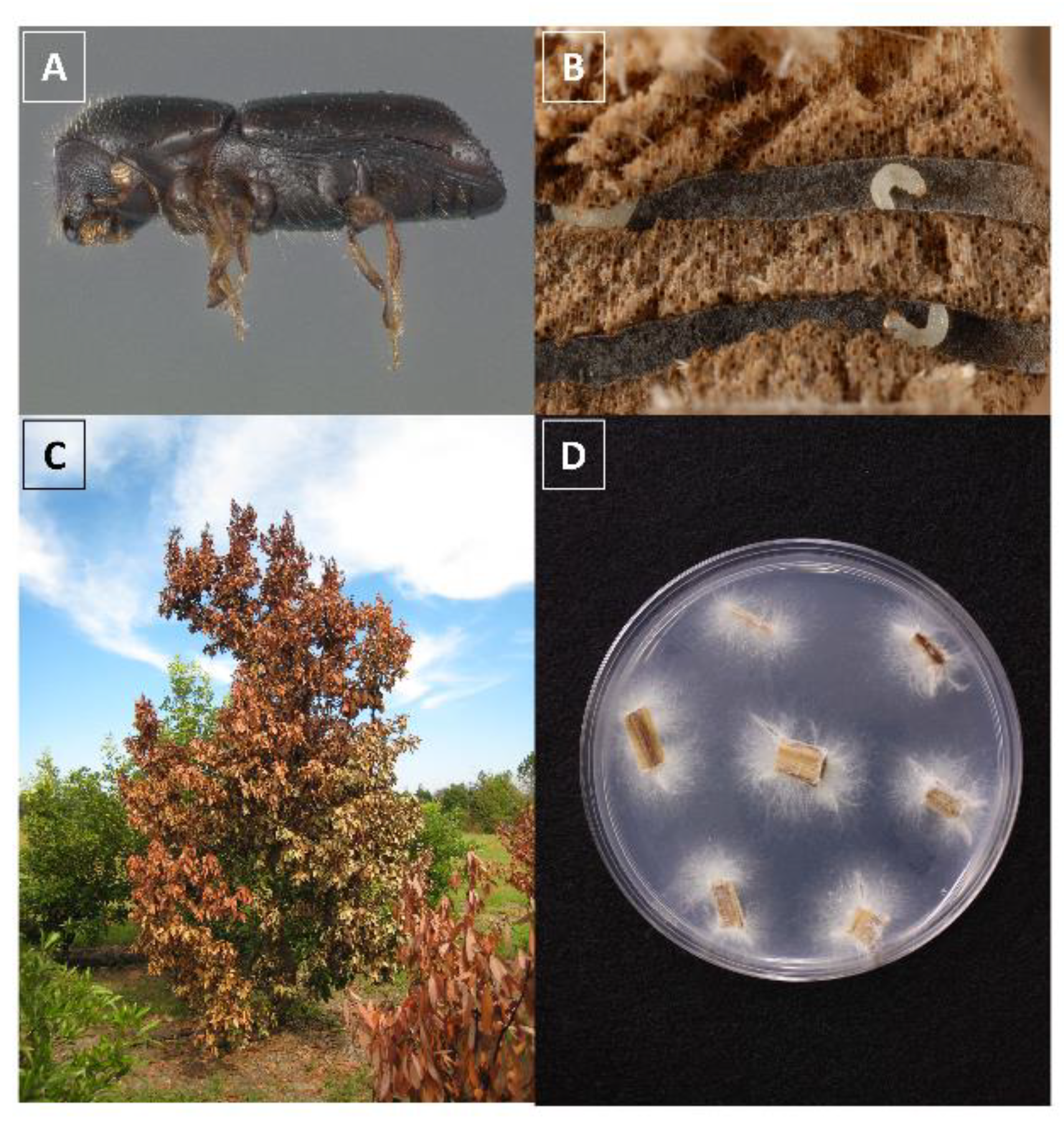
The redbay ambrosia beetles Xyleborus glabratus (A) adult female and (B) larvae within a gallery, (C) wilted and recently killed redbay tree and (D) Raffaelea lauricola in culture.

Harringtonia lauricola serves as a source of nutrition for X. glabratus and their larvae, as asexual spores called conidia proliferate throughout tunnels excavated by the pioneer female. These tunnels are called galleries and exist in the tree's xylem. The xylem itself is nutritionally very poor for the beetles.

During transport from tree to tree, the fungus resides in the female's mycangium, a specialized organ for carrying fungal spores to new hosts which protects the fungus from desiccating, or drying out. The mycangia of X. glabratus are small, internal pockets at the base of a female's mandibles which cannot be seen with the naked eye.

Xyleborus glabratus does not colonize healthy trees in its native range of Asia, but does attack apparently healthy Lauraceae trees in the southeastern United States. This is unique when compared to most other ambrosia beetles, as they primarily attack dead or dying trees, and makes them a threat to forests and agriculture, such as the avocado industry.

Ambrosia beetles communicate with their environment via semiochemicals. When Xyleborus glabratus attacks healthy laurels, it begins with a single pioneer female that is attracted to leaf volatiles emitted by living Lauraceae; though, these females are often killed by the plant's defenses when attempting to bore new galleries. These attacked trees, however, are still inoculated with Harringtonia lauricola, which spreads throughout the tree's vascular system and causes tyloses, or balloon-like swellings of the parenchymal cells, that block water flow in the xylem. This ultimately kills the tree and attracts more Xyleborus glabratus to attack the dying tree due to its emission of sesquiterpenes.

The conidia of Harringtonia lauricola are what Xyleborus glabratus transport in their mycangium. Conidia are asexual spores that undergo unicellular replication, much like yeasts, within the mycangium to increase numbers during dispersal. Then, the H. lauricola inoculum becomes filamentous and undergoes multicellular replication once within the tree tissue, which then lines the galleries of X. glabratus and primarily feeds their larvae. In its native range, Harringtonia lauricola reproduces sexually and is considered heterothallic, or requiring two different mating types to reproduce. However, in the United States, only one mating type has been found and recorded as of 2017.

== Management & human relevance ==
Tree decline caused by Harringtonia lauricola infection is called laurel wilt, and is characterized by rapid yellowing of leaves, branch death, branch tip wilting, and pinhole-sized bore holes on the trunks of mature trees with compacted sawdust tubes emerging from them. Upon peeling back the bark of recently infected trees, one may also find black streaks on the sapwood.

There is no cure for Harringtonia lauricola infection, but rather an emphasis on preventing acquisition of the fungus. Effective management strategies include: maintaining healthy laurel trees to reduce Xyleborus glabratus attraction, early detection of laurel wilt's signs and symptoms, and uprooting and chipping infected trees as soon as possible to prevent further spread. In most cases, fungicide and insecticide treatments are not cost effective or useful.

=== Management ===
To maintain healthy laurels, one should minimize afflictions such as root rot, nutrient deficiency, drought stress, flooding, and freezing. Management techniques for healthy laurels include pruning and white-washing the trunks of mature trees to prevent sun damage. Planting laurel trees too close together can make them more likely to form root grafts between infected and non-infected trees, which causes the pathogen to spread faster.

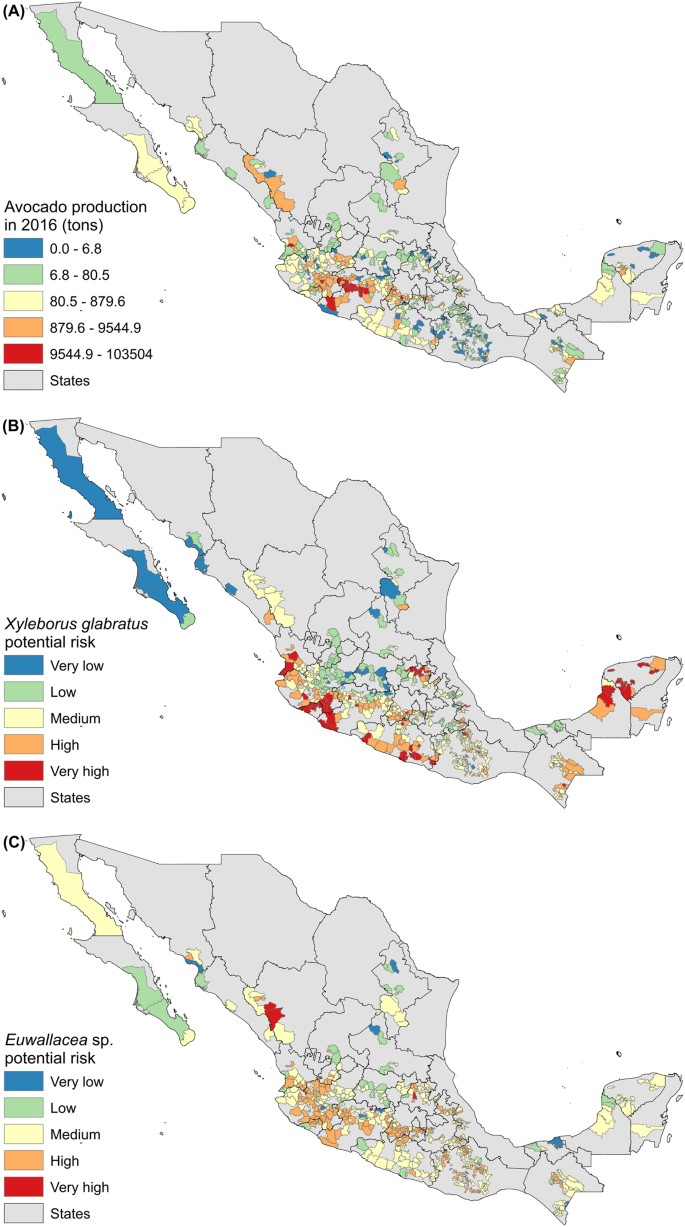
Avocado production and X. glabratus potential spread in Mexico

Injecting healthy trees with propiconazole fungicide can be helpful in minimizing spread from an already infected tree, provided that the infected tree and any subsequently infected trees are removed and uprooted/chipped. These injections last for 12 to 24 months before requiring re-application. Propiconazole is a preventative fungicide, and cannot be used reliably on already infected trees.

To control Xyleborus glabratus, contact insecticides may be applied to chipped wood to ensure beetle death, or to healthy laurels every 14 days to prevent spread. Some common insecticides used to control ambrosia beetles are zeta-cypermethrin, bifenthrin, lambda-cyhalothrin, thiamethoxam, and fenpropathrin. However, these insecticides have limited success and it is best to prevent beetle outbreak than try to control it after colonization.

=== Human relevance ===
Though avocado (Persea americana) is not a primary host for Xyleborus glabratus, if one avocado tree is attacked, the entire avocado grove can become rapidly infected by Harringtonia lauricola. This puts the livelihoods of south Florida avocado growers at stake, an industry which had an economic impact of $55 million in 2012.

Due to increasing climate and international trade, there is also a large potential risk of Xyleborus glabratus expanding its range into Mexico, and thus bringing Harringtonia lauricola and laurel wilt disease to the most productive avocado groves in the world. Mexico's avocado industry is valued at multiple billions of dollars and could see massive economic loss if affected. For this reason, Mexico's commercial ports should be meticulously monitored for X. glabratus and potentially infected wood material.
