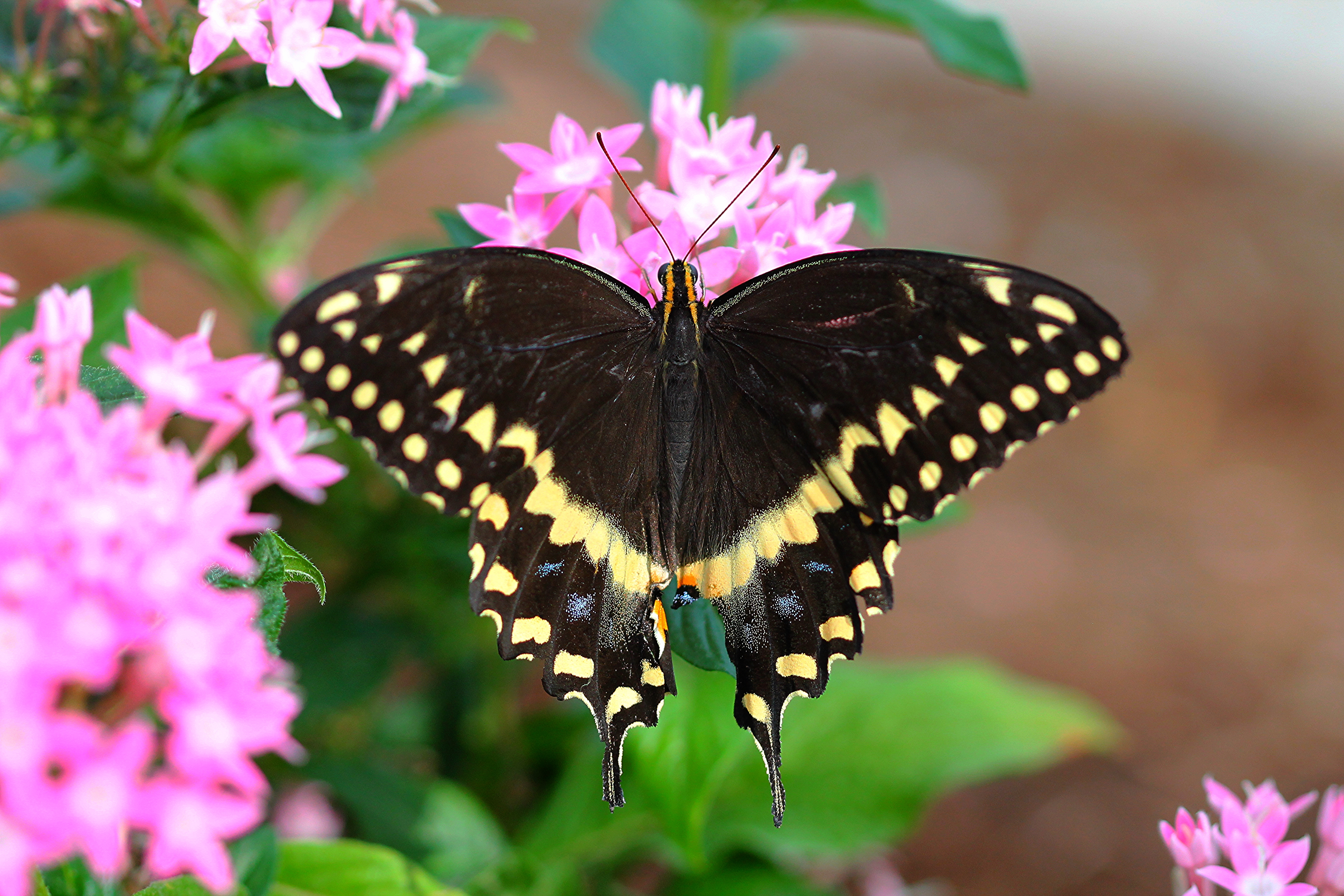

Conservation status
- Apparently Secure (NatureServe)

Scientific classification
- Kingdom: Animalia
- Phylum: Arthropoda
- Class: Insecta
- Order: Lepidoptera
- Family: Papilionidae
- Genus: Papilio
- Species: P. palamedes

Binomial name
- Papilio palamedes (Drury, 1773)
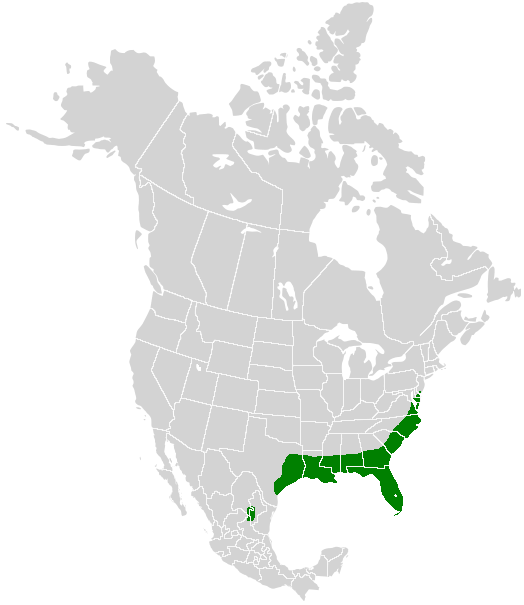

= Papilio palamedes =

Palamedes swallowtail

Species of butterfly

Papilio palamedes, the Palamedes swallowtail or laurel swallowtail, is a North American butterfly in the family Papilionidae.

== Description ==
The upperside of the wings is blackish brown with both wings having a yellow postmedian band and a yellow submarginal band. There is a yellow bar at the end of the forewing cell. The underside of the wings is black with the forewing having a yellow postmedian band and a yellow submarginal band. The hindwing has a few colored bands; the first being cream; the second, orange; the third, blue; and the fourth, orange. There is a yellow streak on the inner margin of the hindwing which runs parallel to the body. The wingspan ranges from 4 1/2 to 5 1/8 inches (11 to 13 cm).

== Habitat ==
This species may be found in habitats such as cypress swamplands, coastal swamplands, wet riparian forests, bay forests, and savannas in the southeastern United States and northeastern Mexico. Their longer tongues allow for specific plant-pollinator relationships with plant species such as Platanthera ciliaris in coastal-plain habitats.

== Flight ==
The Palamedes swallowtail is encountered from May to October in southeastern Virginia and from March to December in more southern regions. In Mexico it is represented by subspecies P. p. leontis Rothschild & Jordan, 1906.

== Life cycle ==
Males seek females by patrolling near forest edges and forest openings. In courtship, the male and female will fly about a foot apart, slowly flying together in unison. The male will then fly above and behind the female to disperse his pheromones and he will continue to do this until the female decides to mate with him. Females lay their pale greenish-yellow eggs singly on host plant leaves. The larva is green with two false eyespots on the thorax. It has a few blue spots on the first abdominal segment to the eighth segment. It also lives in a leaf shelter. The larva is almost identical to the caterpillar of the spicebush swallowtail (Papilio troilus, except the spicebush swallowtail larva has larger false eyes, larger blue spots, and different host plant preferences.) However, in the coastal Southeast, a subspecies of the spicebush swallowtail P. t. ilioneus shares the redbay (Persea borbonia) as a host plant. The green chrysalis has a whitish lateral stripe edged with brown above and has two horns on the head. The chrysalis hibernates. The Palamedes swallowtail has two or three broods per year.

== Host plants ==
- Redbay, Persea borbonia
- Swampbay, Persea palustris
- White sassafras, Sassafras albidum
