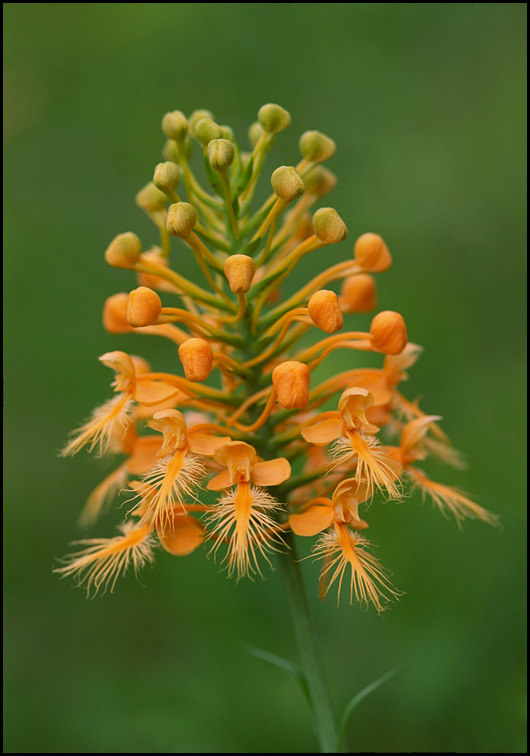
- Platanthera ciliaris

Conservation status
- Secure (NatureServe)
- CITES Appendix II

Scientific classification
- Kingdom: Plantae
- Clade: Tracheophytes
- Clade: Angiosperms
- Clade: Monocots
- Order: Asparagales
- Family: Orchidaceae
- Subfamily: Orchidoideae
- Genus: Platanthera
- Species: P. ciliaris

Binomial name
- Platanthera ciliaris (L.) Lindl.
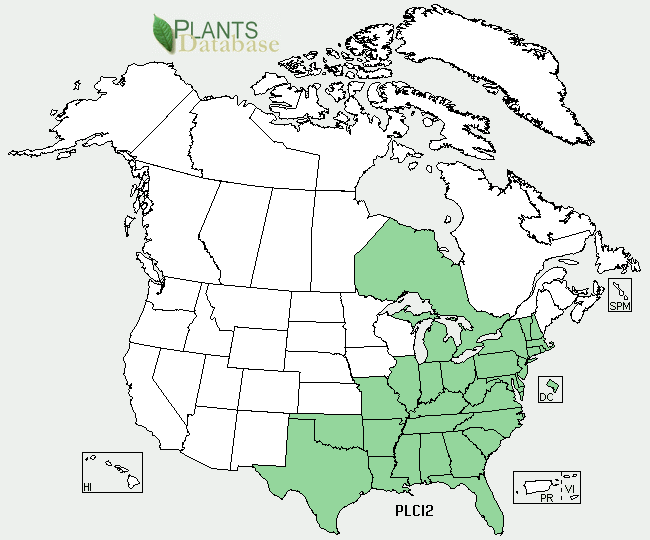
- Yellow fringed orchid range

Synonyms
- Orchis ciliaris L.; Habenaria ciliaris (L.) R.Br.; Blephariglottis flaviflora Raf.; Blephariglottis ciliaris (L.) Rydb.

= Platanthera ciliaris =

Yellow fringed orchid

Species of orchid

Platanthera ciliaris, commonly known as the yellow fringed orchid or orange fringed orchid, is a large and showy species of orchid. Widely distributed across eastern North American, this orchid can be found along the longleaf pine landscapes of the Gulf Coast of the United States, as well as in various acidic wetlands, bogs, and pine savannas. Like many species in these habitats, it is dependent upon sunny, open conditions to thrive. Often, these environments are created from periodic disturbances such as recurring fires.

P. ciliaris is a perennial that depends on mycorrhizal fungi for seed germination and often hybridizes with other closely related Platanthera species. The species is primarily pollinated by large butterflies, mostly swallowtails, and has been known to vary pollinator species depending on geographic location of a given population.

Although globally secure, the species faces regional declines and is classified as endangered in most US states, driven by habitat loss, predation, and biotic pressures.

== Taxonomy, distribution, and habitat ==
The genus name, platanthera, is of Greek origins, with the roots platys and anthera, meaning "broad" and "anther," respectively. The species name "ciliaris," however, was derived from the Latin word cilium, which means eyelid or eyelashes. Originally named Habenaria ciliaris, French botanist Louis Claude Marie Richard moved to cultivate a unique genus Platenthera from Orchis and Habenaria due to the distinct shape and size of anthers, the pollen producing organ of the stamen, among the approximately 200 species that fall under the genus.

Platanthera ciliaris is native to eastern North America, occurring from Ontario and Massachusetts westward to Michigan and eastern Oklahoma, and south through the Gulf Coastal Plain to Florida and eastern Texas. Although widespread across this range, local population densities are often low, with many sites supporting only scattered individuals rather than large colonies. Geographic variation within the species is particularly notable and is closely tied to regional pollinators, which have influenced morphological divergence among mountain and coastal-plain populations.

Across its range, P. ciliaris occupies a broad array of wetland habitats. It is commonly found in bogs, wet meadows, and pitcher plant savannas but it also occurs in more upland settings such as open pine woods and mountain slopes. The species tends to prefer open, sunny environments but is tolerant of partial shade, particularly in moist or saturated soils. High soil acidity is characteristic of many of its habitats, especially in bogs and seepage areas. These habitat preferences and its wide but scattered distribution illustrate the ecological and biological flexibility of this orchid.

== Biology and reproduction ==
Platanthera ciliaris is an herbaceous perennial orchid that begins growing each spring from overwintering buds formed on one of its thick, fleshy roots the prior growing season. Throughout the growing season, the plant produces an upright stem that flowers in late summer, typically August. Each year, the developing bud produces new roots and tuberoids that will support the next year's growth. This makes the species particularly sensitive to damage early in the season, when it cannot regenerate lost tissues until the following year.

Typically robust, these plants can grow to around 1 meter tall, with leaves concentrated basally and gradually reduced upward along the stem. The reproductive structures, expanded upon in the Floral morphology and pollination section, follow the typical orchid condition in which the stamens and stigmas are fused into a tightly packed column. The specific arrangement allows for precise pollen deposition onto visiting pollinators.

The highly abundant seeds of Platanthera ciliaris are exceedingly small, allowing for easy dispersal by wind or water. However, successful germination of these seeds requires a unique condition. Because the seeds lack any stored nutrients, successful germination can only occur when they land in substrates containing the appropriate mycorrhizal fungi, which supply sufficient nutrients for early development. In fact, these fungal partners provide sufficient nutrients for seeds to survive underground for several years before emerging above the surface.

A notable characteristic of Platanthera biology is the unique capacity for hybridization. Many species within the genus readily interbreed, and in some regions, hybrids outnumber the parental species. P. ciliaris was particularly noted to have common hybridization in nature with P. blephariglottis. Throughout populations across North American, hybridization between P. ciliaris and other platanthera species is site-dependent and often the result of shared pollinators. Population sites for P. ciliaris are seemingly weak reproductive barriers, and coexisting alongside plants of similar genomic composition introduces extensive capacity for hybridization. Floral morphology also plays an important role in the capacity for hybridization among Platanthera species. For example, P. ciliaris had more extensive hybridization with P. blephariglottis than P. cristata had with either of the two species because of the similarities within the morphology of the flower and the length of their spurs.

Although P. ciliaris is self-compatible, natural self-fertilization is seemingly uncommon in nature. These plants predominantly rely on outcrossing, mediated by pollinators for population sustainability and increased genetic diversity in given regions.

== Floral morphology and pollination ==
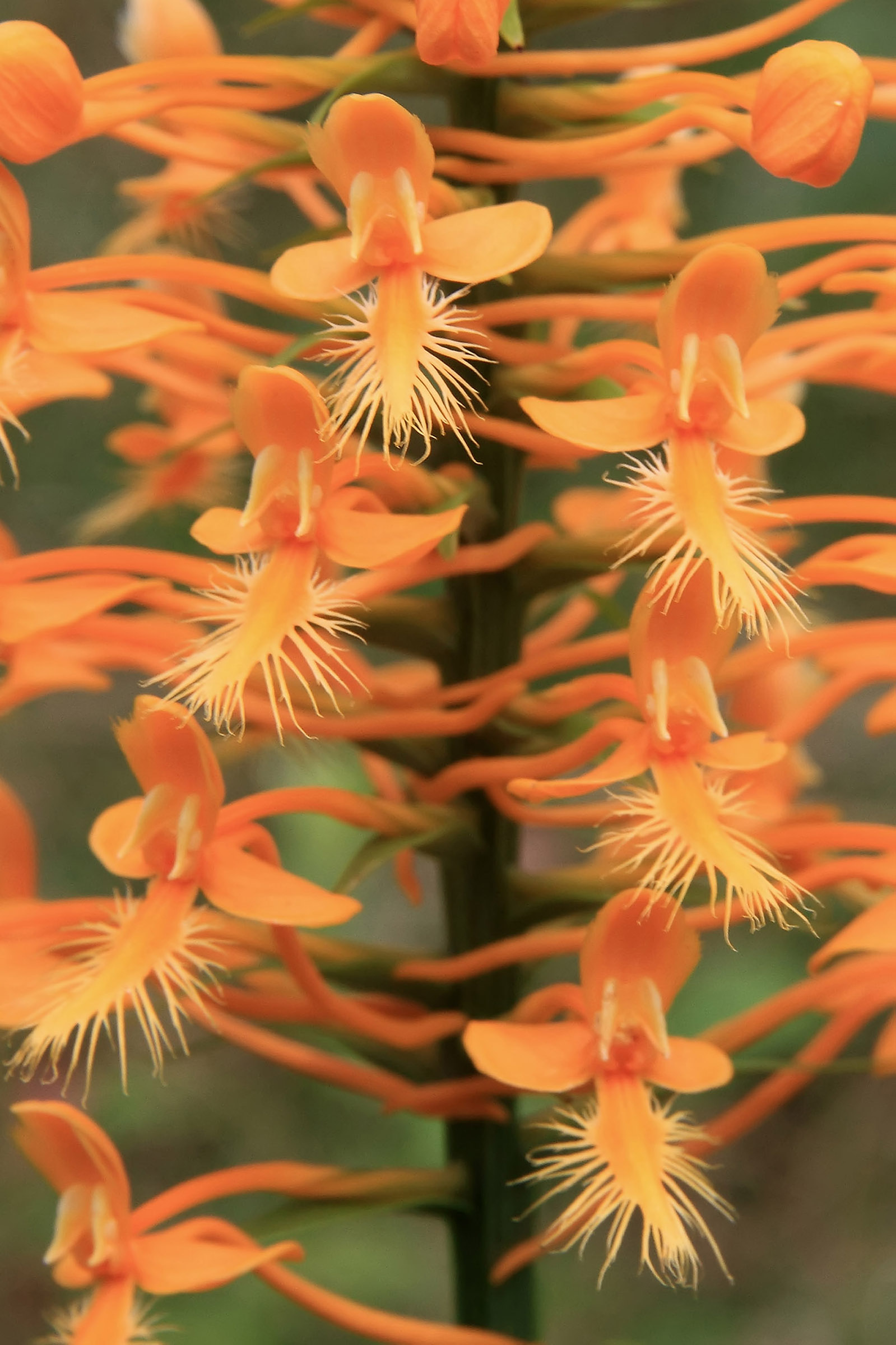
Detailed image of floral structures. "6a Platanthera ciliaris" by NC Orchid is licensed under CC BY 2.0.

Known to flower in late summer, typically in August, P. ciliaris produces unqiuely lacerate, fringed orange flower petals. These fringes help create a broad, visible landing surface for visiting pollinators and contribute to the visual appeal of the flowers. The inflorescence is generally oval in shape, with individual plants bearing anywhere from 20 to 60 flowers. The flowers themselves are resupinate in nature, meaning they twist as they develop so that the lip (labellum) faces downward, presenting a landing platform for pollinators. The bright orange color facilitates daytime detection, with nocturnal moths and other pollinators having been observed to avoid P. ciliaris at night, preferring to visit other members of the Platanethera genus. The sepals help define the flower's fringed outline and create open "windows" around the labellum, increasing visual access for pollinators.

Arguably the most defining floral feature of P. ciliaris is its elongated nectar spur. This elongated nectar spur, as well as local adaptations of this nectar spur, is the trait most responsible for the species' pollinator specificity. Spur lengths generally range from 20 to 35 mm, typically depending on the geographic location of the population, showcasing local adaptation within the species. This elongated spur length makes efficient nectar access possible only for long-tongued pollinators, primarily swallowtail butterflies. Coastal plain populations tend to have longer spurs than those in the Appalachian Mountains, a difference that likely reflects selection exerted by regional pollinator communities.

Like other orchids, the reproductive structures of P. ciliaris are fused into a single structure called the column. The column is compact, about 3x3 mm, and is positioned above the opening of the nectar spur. At the top of the column are the anther sacs, each containing pollinium, a packet of pollen grains that have clumped together. Narrow caudicles connect each pollinium to sticky viscidium which protrude out of the anther sac, forming the pollinarium. The viscidium sit on either side of the spur opening and are angled so that visiting butterflies contact them with their compound eyes as the butterflies reach down for nectar. When a pollinator withdraws from the flower, it tugs on the attached viscidium, and pulls off the entire pollinaria. During the next flower visit, the rotated pollinaria are deposited onto the stigma, which is located above the spur entrance and just below the half-anther cells. This arrangement ensures highly precise pollen transfer and highlights the evolutionary relationship between plant and pollinator.

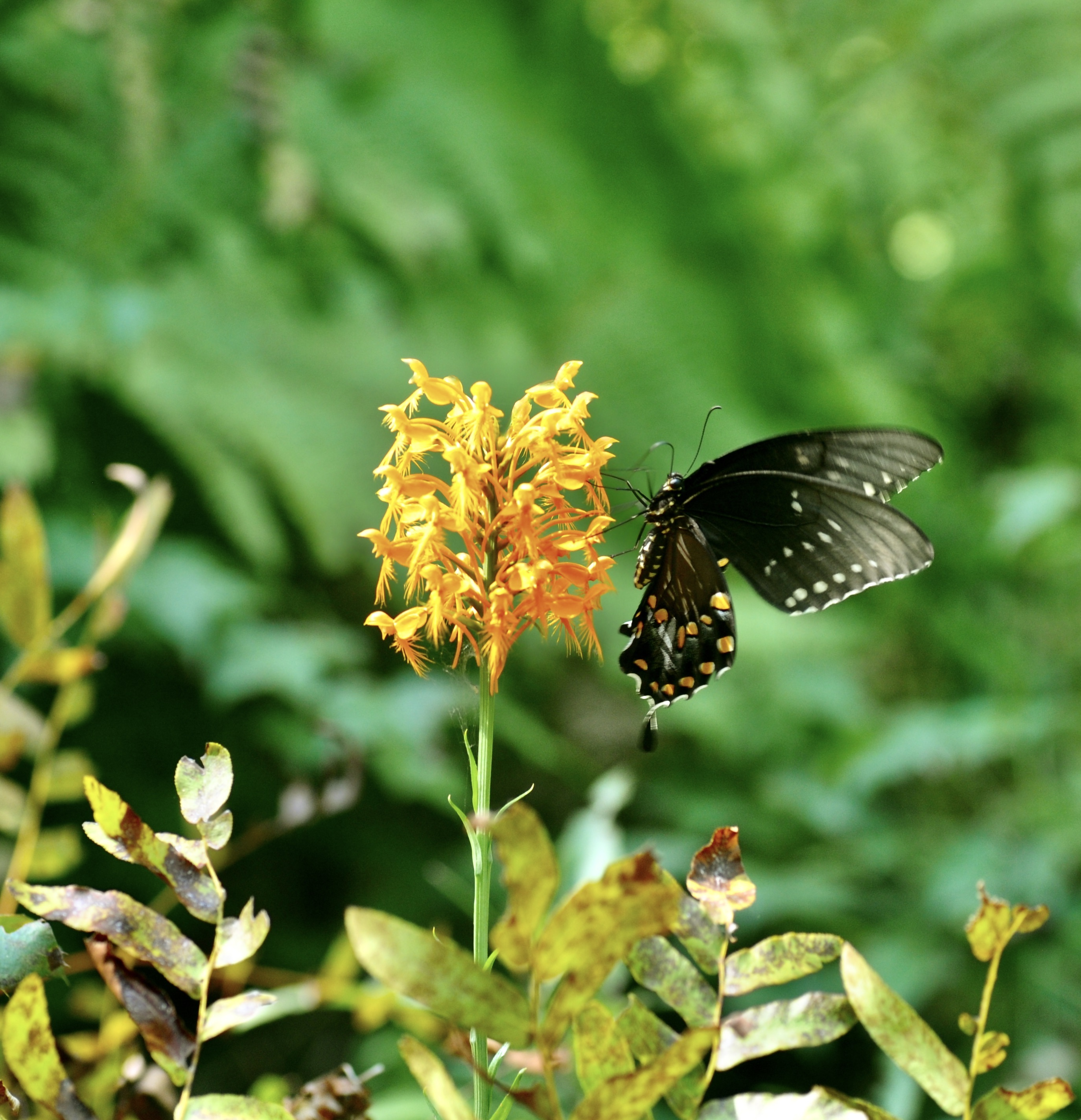
P. ciliaris pollinated by P. troilus

Platanthera ciliaris is notably pollinated by large butterflies, with geographic variations between plant populations playing a role in the species of butterflies that serve as primary pollinators. In mountainous regions of Eastern North America, particularly the Appalachian Mountain Range, Papilio troilus served as the dominant pollinator. Contrastingly, in the coastal plain regions, Papilio palamedes was observed as the primary pollinator of P. ciliaris. Regardless of the region, however, an abundance of different pollinator species were observed sporadically throughout the observation period, contributing to P. ciliaris' high affinity for hybridization.

== Threats and conservation ==
Platanthera ciliaris is considered globally and nationally secure, yet it remains rare or across much of its northern range. Despite once being more widespread in New England, the species now persists at only a handful of sites. It is ranked as endangered (S1-S2) in most states, and has been identified as a Division 2, or regionally rare, species in New England.

While P. ciliaris is widespread across eastern North America, its populations are typically small and vulnerable to disturbances. Many of these populations depend on wetland ecosystems, a particularly vulnerable habitat due to industrial development, pollution, and climate change effects. Between 2009 and 2019, over 670,000 acres of vegetative wetlands were lost. This habitat loss resulted in immense population decline of a variety of flora and fauna, including P. ciliaris.

Population viability is further affected by biotic pressures, such as disease and predation. A fungal "blackening disease" has been documented killing entire colonies of orchids, including P. ciliaris in some regions. This disease, often called "black rot," is characterized by the appearance of water-soaked dark spots on leaves and roots that often turn into lesions. Additionally, herbivory from deer, rabbits, and rodents can remove flowering stalks or buds, directly reducing reproductive fitness and sometimes fully killing the plant. Given the species' inability to regrow damaged tissue until the following growing season, these disturbances are especially detrimental.

Platanthera ciliaris is self-compatible but not autogamous, meaning it relies entirely on pollinators for reproduction and population persistence. Declining populations have been observed in areas where the primary pollinator is Papilio palamedes. This decline can be attributed to laurel wilt disease, known to kill the larval host trees of Papilio palamedes. As these primary pollinators die out, the secondary pollinators offer little to no compensation, meaning P. ciliaris populations will subsequently begin to disappear in these areas.

Genetic threats also factor into conservation planning. Weak reproductive barriers between P. ciliaris and P. blephariglottis allow hybridization to occur readily, producing offspring that may exhibit maladaptive traits or dilute parental genotypes.

Effective conservation will rely on the maintenance of current populations rather than the restoration of previous populations. Habitat loss has become so extensive that the capacity for reintroduction is quite limited. The recommended conservation action, as cited by the New York Natural Heritage Program, are "site/area protection," "resource & habitat protection," "site/area management," "invasive/problematic species control," and "habitat & natural process restoration."

== Uses ==
The modern uses of Platanthera ciliaris remain relatively unknown, however, historically Native American tribes, notably the Cherokee and Seminole tribes, have used the species in a variety of ways. Medicinally, the roots of the plant were used as an anti-diarrhetic, to relieve headaches, and even to treat snake bites. Additionally, fishermen would use bits of the roots as bait, as it was believed to "make the fish bite better."
