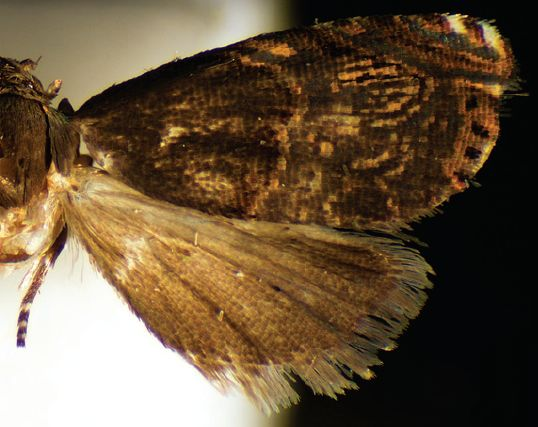

Scientific classification
- Domain: Eukaryota
- Kingdom: Animalia
- Phylum: Arthropoda
- Class: Insecta
- Order: Lepidoptera
- Family: Tortricidae
- Genus: Riculorampha
- Species: R. ancyloides

Binomial name
- Riculorampha ancyloides Rota & J. W. Brown, 2009

= Riculorampha ancyloides =

Species of insect

Riculorampha ancyloides is a moth of the family Tortricidae. It is found in southern Florida.

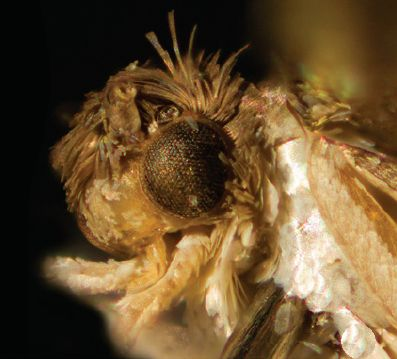
Lateral view of the head

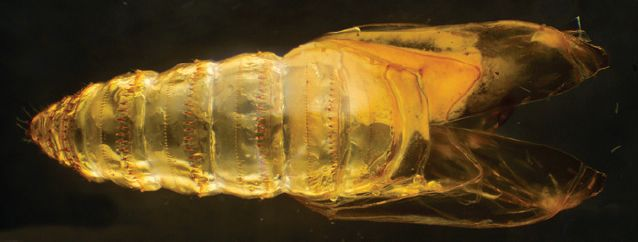
Pupal exuvia

The length of the forewings is 3.5-4.5 mm for males and 4–5 mm for females.

The larvae feed on the fruit of Persea borbonia.
