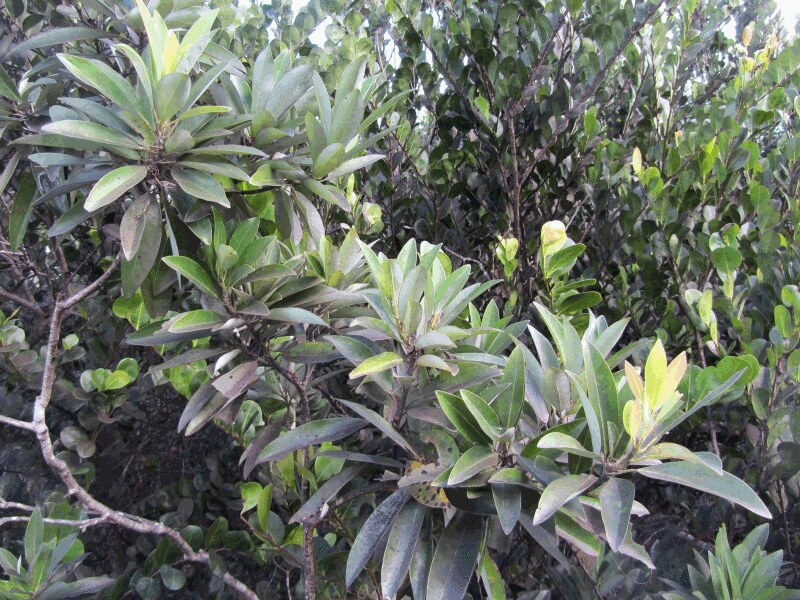
- Swamp bay leaves

Conservation status
- Vulnerable (IUCN 3.1)

- Secure (NatureServe)

Scientific classification
- Kingdom: Plantae
- Clade: Tracheophytes
- Clade: Angiosperms
- Clade: Magnoliids
- Order: Laurales
- Family: Lauraceae
- Genus: Tamala
- Species: T. palustris

Binomial name
- Tamala palustris Raf.

Synonyms
- Persea borbonia var. pubescens (Pursh) Little; Persea palustris (Raf.) Sarg.; Persea pubescens (Pursh) Sarg.; Tamala pubescens (Pursh) Small

= Tamala palustris =

Species of tree in the family Lauraceae

Tamala palustris, also known as swamp bay or swampbay, is a small tree or shrub found throughout the Southeastern United States and the Bahamas, with much of its range overlapping with that of its relative Tamala borbonia. It is generally not more than 40 feet (12 meters) tall, with bark separated into scales by fissures across its surface. Mature leaves are green, paler on their undersides, which have prominent brownish or reddish-brown hairs. The species prefers swamps and coastal areas, particularly locations with moist, peat-rich soil. It is sensitive to the fungal disease known as laurel wilt, even more so than related species.

== Description ==
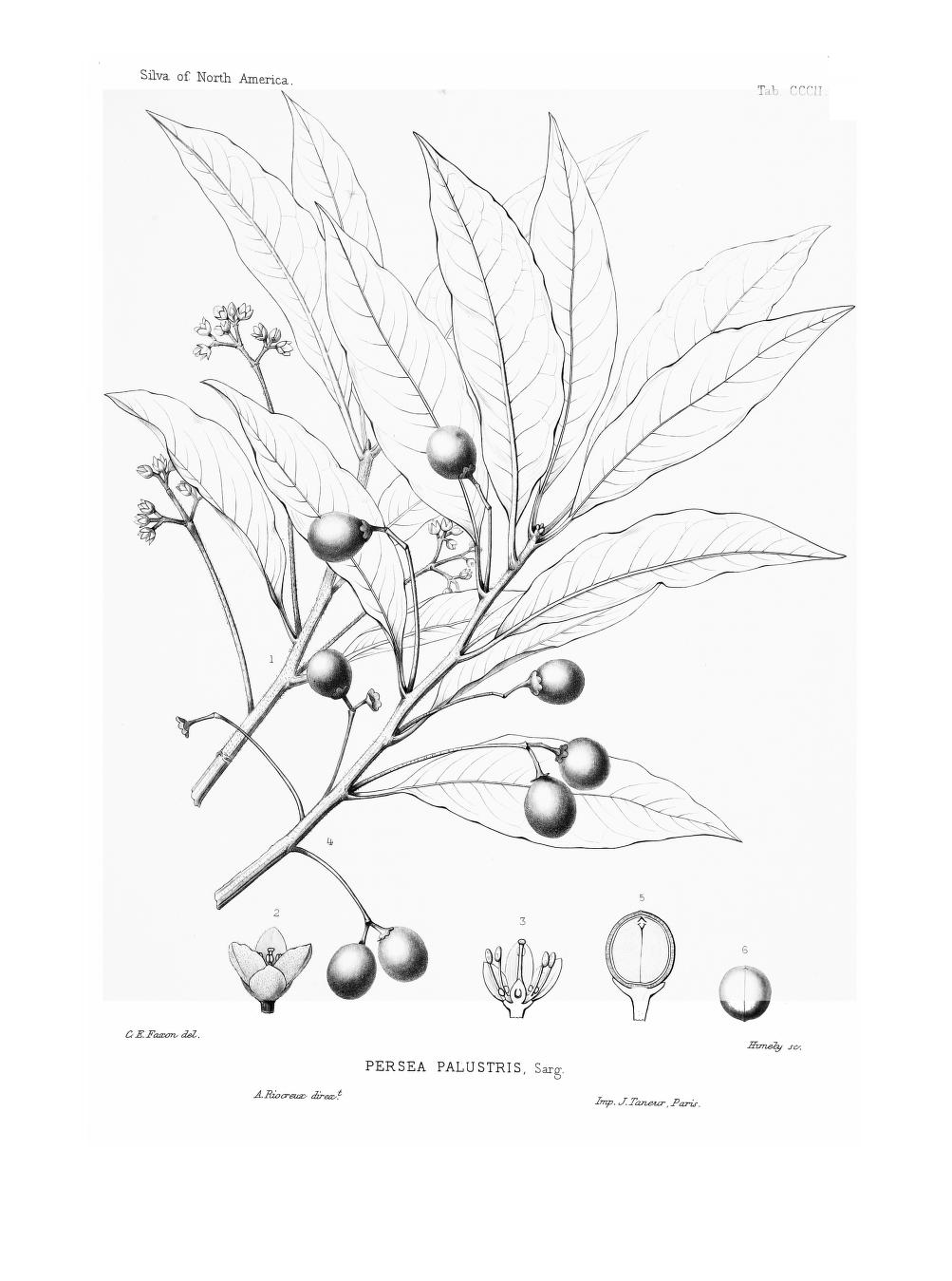
Illustration of Tamala palustris by Charles Sprague Sargent

Tamala palustris can appear as a slender tree, with a trunk between 30 and 40 feet (9 and 12 meters) tall. The trunk is usually under 1 ft (0.3 m) in diameter. More commonly, however, it grows as a shrub with stems between 12 and 15 ft (3.7 and 4.6 m). The dull brown bark is typically no more than 0.25 inches (6.4 millimeters) thick, with fissures separating its surface into individual scales. The branches are stout, and when young, they are terete (have circular cross-sections) and slightly angled. During the tree's first two seasons, it is covered with a layer of rust-colored tomentum, which is significantly reduced after that time and completely gone in two or three years. The leaves can be lanceolate or long-elliptic, medium to dark green on their uppersides, with paler undersides, which are covered in distinctive brownish hairs. They are 2–8 in (5–20 centimeters) long. The flowers are small and bisexual (having both male and female components), with 6 tepals (outer parts), 9 stamens (pollen-producing organs), and one pistil (which contains female reproductive parts). They are yellow-green, with 2–3 petals, and appear in May and June. The fruit is a small drupe (a single seed surrounded by flesh), oblong or rounded, and about 0.4 in (1 cm) long. The dense, reddish brown hairy coating on the leaves and branches readily distinguishes it from its relatives Tamala humilis and Tamala borbonia.

== Taxonomy ==
Tamala palustris was initially described as Laurus carolinensis by François André Michaux in 1813, and then reassigned to Laurus carolinensis var. pubescens by Frederick Traugott Pursh. Constantine Samuel Rafinesque later described it as Tamala palustris in 1838. Charles Sprague Sargent later used the name Persea pubescens in 1895. In 1919, he revised its name to Persea palustris, due to the naming rules adopted by the International Botanical Congress, which stated that the first specific name must be used. In 2023, Rafinesque's Tamala was reintroduced after genetic studies showed a broadly-defined Persea to be polyphyletic. As a result Tamala palustris along with Tamala borbonia and Tamala humilis were separated into genus Tamala. Of these names, the Integrated Taxonomic Information System only recognizes Persea pubescens, Persea borbonia var. pubescens (given by Elbert Luther Little), Persea palustris, and Tamala pubescens (given by John Kunkel Small) as synonyms for Tamala palustris. The plant is commonly referred to as swamp bay or swampbay.

== Distribution and habitat ==
Tamala palustris is distributed throughout the Southeastern United States and the Bahamas, found in eleven different US states, from Delaware to Southeast Texas. Its range heavily overlaps with that of the Tamala borbonia. It is common throughout Florida, including the Florida Keys. It is also common in coastal plain regions of North Carolina. Its natural habitat includes swamps, bays, pocosins, coastal swales, and maritime forests, particularly in wet, peaty soil, although it can also grow in dry, sandy soil.

== Conservation ==
Laurel wilt is a significant danger to Tamala palustris. It is caused by the fungus Raffaelea lauricola, which is spread by the redbay ambrosia beetle, a nonnative species introduced to the United States (other species of ambrosia beetle can also carry it, but at lower levels). While laurel wilt affects other members of Lauraceae, swamp bay is particularly sensitive. It is more resistant to galls (swelling growths) than Tamala borbonia.
