= Raffaelea subfusca =

Scientific classification
- Domain: Eukaryota
- Kingdom: Fungi
- Division: Ascomycota
- Class: Sordariomycetes
- Order: Ophiostomatales
- Family: Ophiostomataceae
- Genus: Raffaelea
- Species: R. subfusca

Binomial name
- Raffaelea subfusca Harrington, Aghayeva & Fraedrich (2010)

Species of fungus

Raffaelea subfusca is a mycangial fungus, first isolated from female adults of the redbay ambrosia beetle, Xyleborus glabratus.
