= Raffaele Ciferri =

Italian botanist, agriculturalist and mycologist

Raffaele Ciferri (30 May 1897, Fermo – 12 February 1964, Pavia) was an Italian botanist, agriculturalist and mycologist.

He studied agricultural sciences at the University of Bologna. From 1925 to 1932, he was based in the Dominican Republic, where he helped establish an experimental agricultural station in Santiago de los Caballeros for studies of cassava. While in Latin America, he also conducted research of diseases affecting cacao in Ecuador. In 1934–35 he was stationed in Italian Somaliland, performing organizational work involving agrarian services.

In 1936 he was appointed professor of botany to the faculty of agriculture in Florence, and from 1942 onward, served as a professor of botany at the University of Pavia.

A prolific writer, he was the author of well over 1000 published works on subjects that included mycology, plant pathology and physiology, microbiology, virology, lichenology, the systematics of cultivated plants, agronomy, and the history of botany. Ciferri issued the exsiccata Mycoflora Domingensis exsiccata. The ambrosia fungus genus Raffaelea is named in his honor, as are multiple species with the epithet ciferrii.

Together with mycologist Ruggero Tomaselli, Ciferri published 215 alternative names for the fungal component (the mycobiont) of lichens; most of these ended in the suffix -myces. The vast majority of these names were later determined to be formally illegitimate according to nomenclatural rules.

== Selected works ==
- "Micoflora Domingensis", 1929.
- I Cereali dell'Africa Italiana, 1939 – Cereals of Italian Africa.
- Fisiologia vegetale e piante agrarie, 1943 – Plant physiology and agricultural plants.
- Manuale di patologia vegetale, 1952 – Manual of plant physiology.
- "Thesaurus literaturae mycologicae et lichenologicae", 1957.
- Manuale di micologia medica, 1958 – Manual of medical mycology.
- "Bibliographia mycopathologica, 1800-1940", 1958.
- Il cacao e la sua evoluzione, 1963 – Cacao and its evolution.
