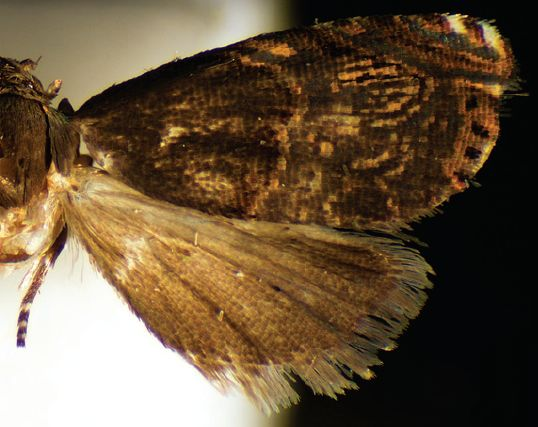
- Riculorampha ancyloides

Scientific classification
- Kingdom: Animalia
- Phylum: Arthropoda
- Clade: Pancrustacea
- Class: Insecta
- Order: Lepidoptera
- Family: Tortricidae
- Subfamily: Olethreutinae
- Genus: Riculorampha; Rota & J.W. Brown, 2009

Species
- Many: see text

= Riculorampha =

Genus of tortrix moths

Riculorampha is a genus of moths in the family Tortricidae.

== Species ==
- Riculorampha ancyloides Rota & J.W. Brown, 2009
