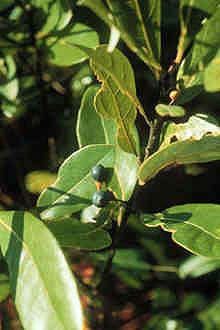
- Tamala borbonia leaves and fruit

Scientific classification
- Kingdom: Plantae
- Clade: Tracheophytes
- Clade: Angiosperms
- Clade: Magnoliids
- Order: Laurales
- Family: Lauraceae
- Genus: Tamala; Raf., 1838

Type species
- Tamala borbonia (L.) Raf., 1838

Species
- Tamala borbonia Tamala humilis Tamala palustris

Synonyms
- Burbonia Plum. ex Fabr., non Borbonia L.

= Tamala (plant) =

Genus of flowering plants

Tamala is a genus of flowering plants in the family Lauraceae. It includes three species native to the southeastern United States, ranging from Delaware to Texas, and to the Bahamas.

- Tamala borbonia (L.) Raf.
- Tamala humilis (Nash) Small
- Tamala palustris Raf.

== Taxonomy ==
The generic name is derived from the Sanskrit word तमाल tamāla referring to 'a tree with a very dark bark'. Rafinesque applied the name to the American genus of laurels alluding to Cinnamomum tamala.
