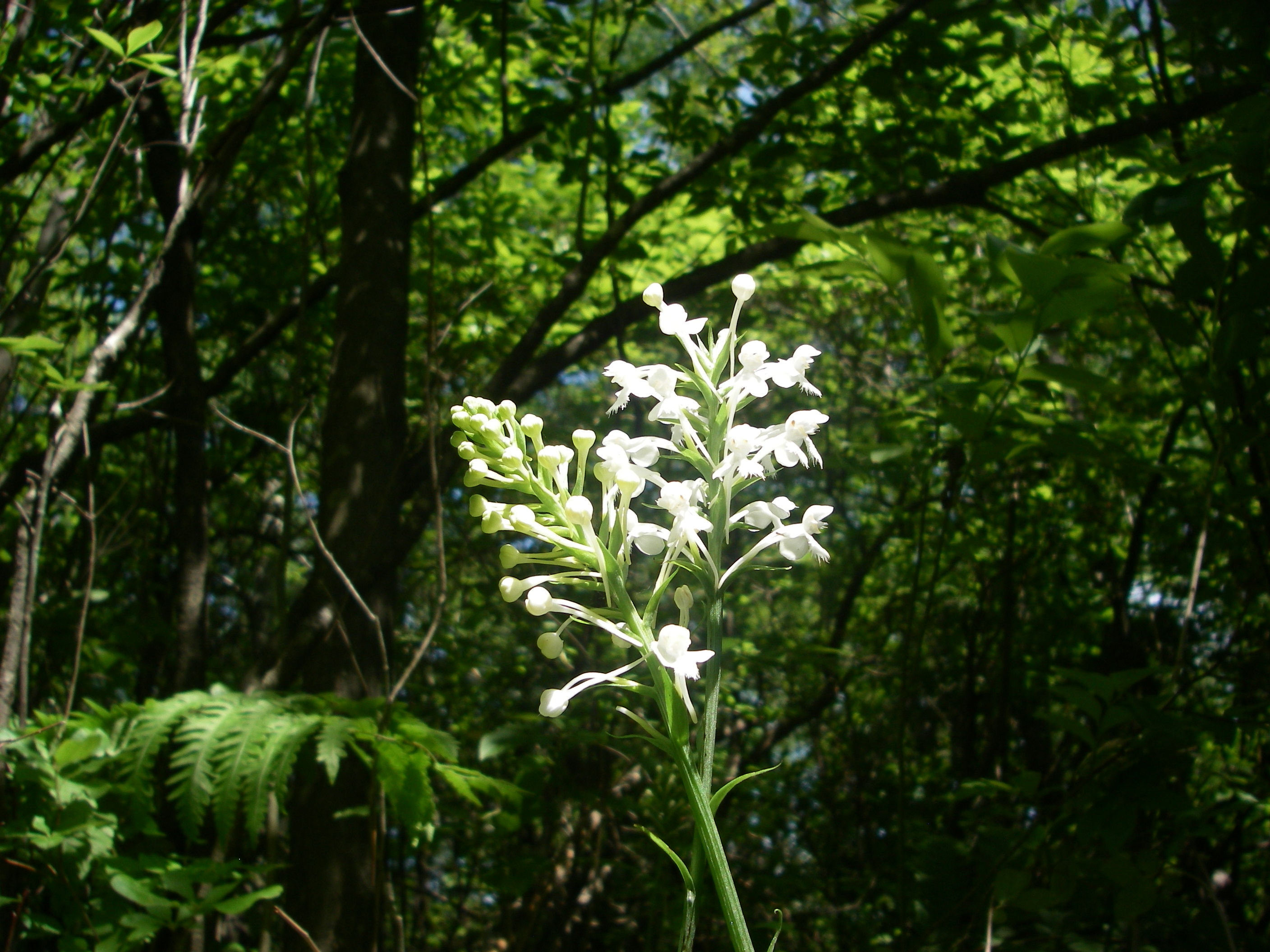
- Flower of Platanthera blephariglottis

Conservation status
- Apparently Secure (NatureServe)

Scientific classification
- Kingdom: Plantae
- Clade: Tracheophytes
- Clade: Angiosperms
- Clade: Monocots
- Order: Asparagales
- Family: Orchidaceae
- Subfamily: Orchidoideae
- Genus: Platanthera
- Species: P. blephariglottis

Binomial name
- Platanthera blephariglottis (Willd.) Lindl.

Varieties
- P. blephariglottis var. blephariglottis (Willd.) Lindl.; P. blephariglottis var. conspicua (Nash) Luer

Synonyms
- Orchis blephariglottis Willd. (basionym); Orchis ciliaris var. alba Michx.; Habenaria blephariglottis Hook.; Platanthera holopetala Lindl.; Platanthera blephariglottis var. holopetala (Lindl.) Torr.; Platanthera ciliaris var. blephariglottis (Willd.) Chapm.; Habenaria blephariglottis var. holopetala (Lindl.) A.Gray; Habenaria ciliaris var. holopetala (Lindl.) Morong; Blephariglottis blephariglottis (Hook.) Rydb.; Blephariglottis blephariglottis var. holopetala (Lindl.) Rydb.; Blephariglottis alba House; Habenaria blephariglottis f. holopetala (Lindl.) J.Rousseau & B.Boivin; Platanthera blephariglottis f. holopetala (Lindl.) P.M.Br.; Sources: Botanicus, IPNI, ITIS, FNA, MBG

= Platanthera blephariglottis =

White fringed orchid

Species of plant

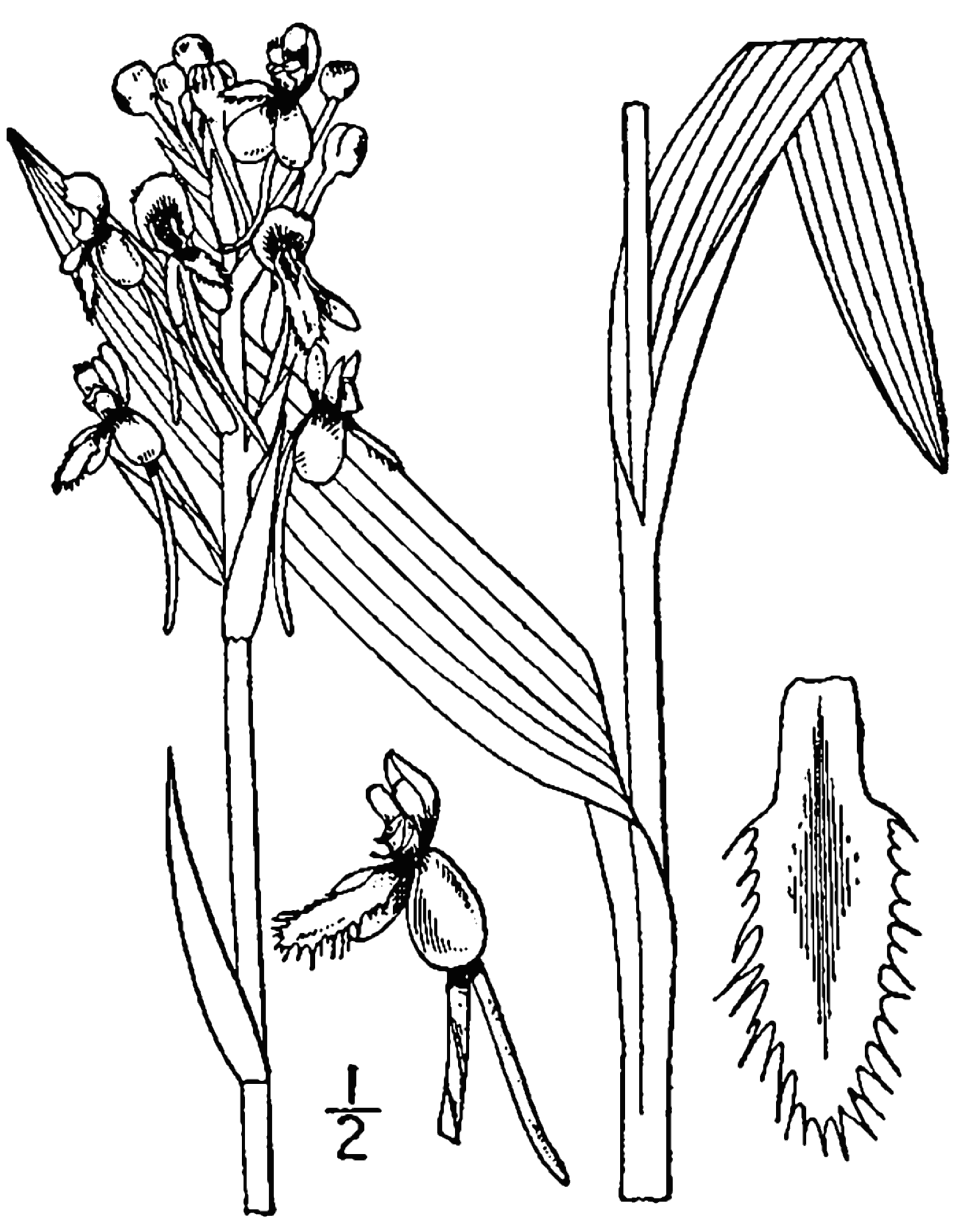
Drawing of B. blephariglottis from 1913

Platanthera blephariglottis, commonly known as the white fringed orchid or white-fringed orchis, is a species of orchid of the genus Platanthera. It is considered to be an endangered species in Connecticut and Ohio, a threatened species in Florida, Maryland and Rhode Island, exploitably vulnerable in New York, and susceptible to be threatened in Québec.

Platanthera is a Greek word that means "flat" and "flower". For this use it means "wide or flat anthered". Blephariglottis is from blepharis which means "eyelash" or "fringed" and glottis for "tongue."

== Description ==
Flowering from late spring until summer, Platanthera blephariglottis is an 8 to 110 centimeters (3 to 43 inches) tall plant that can be found growing in bogs and on the moist banks of lakes and rivers on the eastern side of North America.

Stem and leaves
At least 2 and often several spreading to ascending leaves scattered along the stem. Leaf shapes from linear-lanceolate, ovate-lanceolate and elliptic-lanceolate.

Flowers
Dense to lax spikes of showy white flowers. Lateral sepals bent downward and outward more than 90 degrees. Petals are near entire fringed and the shape is linear and narrows toward the point of attachment.

== Distribution ==
Often found growing in sphagnum and other acidic moss, in open wet areas in black spruce and/or tamarack bogs or on the boggy shores of lakes and in open wet meadows.

Native

Nearctic
Eastern Canada: Ontario, Quebec
Northeastern United States: Connecticut, Maine, Massachusetts, Michigan, New Hampshire, New Jersey, New York, Ohio, Pennsylvania, Rhode Island, Vermont
North-Central United States: Illinois, Missouri, Wisconsin
Southeastern United States: Alabama, Delaware, Florida, Georgia, Louisiana, Maryland, North Carolina, South Carolina, Virginia
South-Central United States: Texas

Sources: NRCS, WSH

Additionally, P. blephariglottis has many hybrid zones along the Eastern Coast of the United States, with Platanthera ciliaris as a key species serving as the counterpart for many of these hybrid zones.
