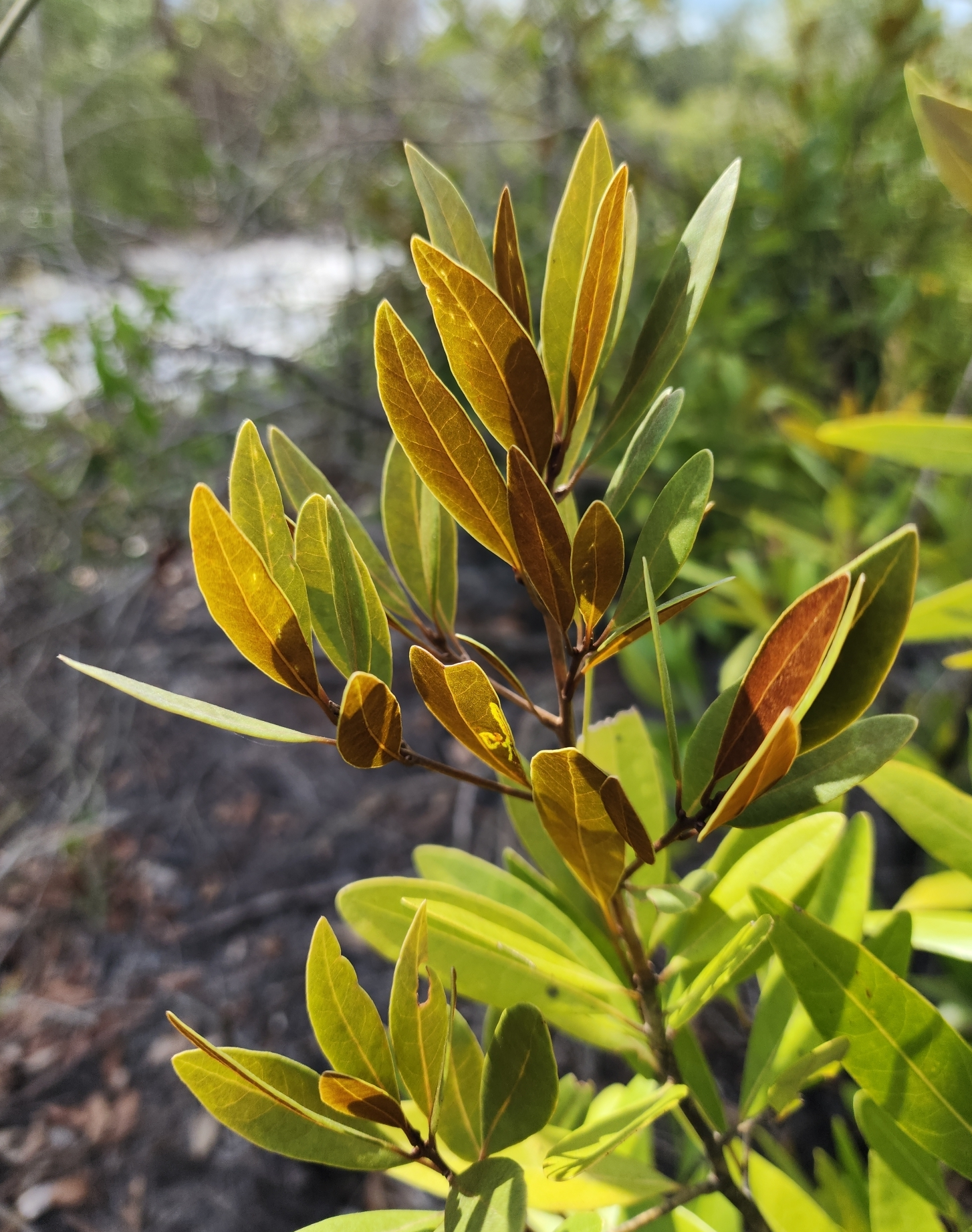
- Growing in open-canopy white sand scrub

Conservation status
- Near Threatened (IUCN 3.1)

- Vulnerable (NatureServe)

Scientific classification
- Kingdom: Plantae
- Clade: Embryophytes
- Clade: Tracheophytes
- Clade: Spermatophytes
- Clade: Angiosperms
- Clade: Magnoliids
- Order: Laurales
- Family: Lauraceae
- Genus: Tamala
- Species: T. humilis

Binomial name
- Tamala humilis (Nash) Small

Synonyms
- Borbonia humilis (Nash) House; Persea borbonia subsp. humilis (Nash) A.E.Murray; Persea borbonia var. humilis (Nash) L.E.Kopp; Persea humilis Nash

= Tamala humilis =

Species of flowering plant

Tamala humilis, commonly referred to as scrub bay or silk bay, is a species of flowering plant in the laurel family endemic to peninsular Florida in the US.

== Habitat ==
It is only known to grow in the deep sands of Florida scrub habitat, where it often associates with Pinus clausa (sand pine) and Ceratiola ericoides (Florida rosemary).

== Conservation ==
The species is relatively widespread and often locally abundant when habitat conditions are suitable. However, the majority of scrub habitat has been destroyed due to development for real estate, agriculture (particularly for citrus), and pine silviculture. Therefore, this species, like other scrub endemics, is threatened by historic and ongoing habitat loss in addition to fire suppression and invasive species.
