= Laurel wilt =

Plant disease

Laurel Wilt
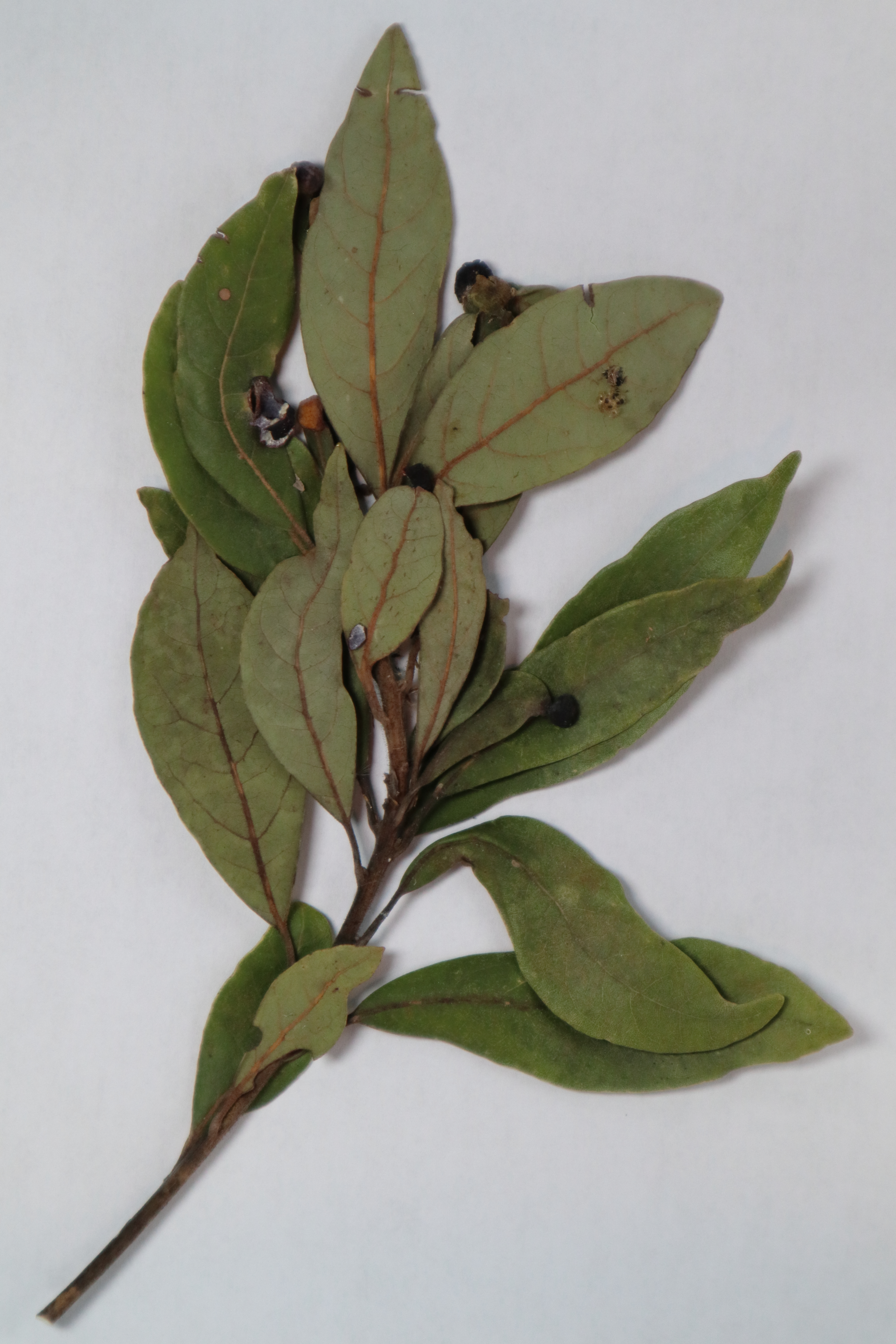
- Common names: laurel wilt disease
- Causal agents: Harringtonia lauricola
- Hosts: laurel family
- Vectors: Xyleborus glabratus
- EPPO Code: RAFFLA

Laurel wilt, also called laurel wilt disease, is a vascular disease that is caused by the fungus Harringtonia lauricola (previously known as Raffaelea lauricola), which is transmitted by the invasive redbay ambrosia beetle, Xyleborus glabratus. The disease affects and kills members of the laurel family. The avocado is perhaps the most commercially valuable plant affected by laurel wilt.

== Symptoms ==
Symptoms of laurel wilt include wilted stems and leaves and dark streaking in the wood. Laurel wilt can spread in at least two ways: one is via the beetle's natural reproduction and migration. A second way is through the sale and transport of beetle-infested wood, a result of redbay's use as firewood and for outdoor grilling.

== Life cycle ==
Harringtonia lauricola lives symbiotic with the beetleXyleborus glabratus. It reproduces clonally and is vertically transmitted – originally evolving from a sexual population of mutualists. This combination of traits and ancestral traits is common, however Dreaden et al. 2019 finds H. lauricola to be one of only a few known cases in which the current, vertically transmitted clonal symbiote retains sexuality. Almost all others have dispensed with it and reproduce asexually or functionally so

== History ==
Laurel wilt has been found in South Carolina, North Carolina, Mississippi, Alabama, and Georgia. In 2025, it was confirmed in New York. But its appearance is most notable in Florida, where it has reached as far south as Miami-Dade County and as far west as Bay County. The redbay ambrosia beetle was detected in Savannah, Georgia's Port Wentworth area in spring 2002; however, it is likely to have been established in the area prior to 2002 when the three adult specimens were trapped at the port. The beetle likely entered the country in solid wood packing material with cargo that was imported at Port Wentworth. Redbay trees began dying in Georgia and South Carolina near the Savannah area in 2003. By early 2005, officials with the Georgia Forestry Commission (GFC), South Carolina Forestry Commission (SCFC), and USDA Forest Service began to suspect the newly discovered ambrosia beetle was associated with this mortality.

== Consequences ==
The redbay (Persea borbonia), a tree particularly abundant in maritime forests of Georgia, South Carolina and Florida, has been the primary species affected by the wilt. Sassafras, a less common tree in the coastal plains of the Southeast but with a more extensive range than redbay, has also been affected by the disease but to a lesser extent than redbay. The wilt fungus has also been isolated from dead and dying pondspice (Litsea aestivalis) and pondberry (Lindera melissifolia), however the redbay ambrosia beetle has not been found in either of these species. Pondberry is a federally endangered species while pondspice is regarded as a threatened or endangered species in some southeastern states.

=== Florida avocado industry ===
In 2010, the state's avocado crop earned about $65 million wholesale each year, with commercial avocados growing on 7,500 acres (30 km^{2}) mostly in Miami-Dade County. Avocado represented the second-largest fruit crop in Florida, after citrus.

In 2007, an avocado tree near Jacksonville, FL was found showing symptoms of laurel wilt, and the laurel wilt fungus was confirmed to be present in the tree. Field and laboratory observations have since confirmed that the redbay ambrosia beetle will infest avocado trees, although there may be some variation in how susceptible different avocado cultivars are to the laurel wilt fungus.

In 2011, laurel wilt-infected trees were detected in Miami-Dade County, near areas of commercial avocado groves. Avocado groves in the area are being closely monitored for the presence of the redbay ambrosia beetle and incidence of laurel wilt disease

== Fungicidal efforts ==
In a September 2008 study, a possible fungicide was tested. The abstract of the study reads as follows:

In this study, the systemic fungicide propiconazole completely inhibited mycelial growth of Raffaelea spp. in vitro at concentrations 0.1 parts per million (ppm) or greater and was fungitoxic at 1 ppm or greater, whereas the fungicide thiabendazole was less inhibitory. None of the ten mature redbay trees that received root-flare injections of propiconazole developed crown wilt symptoms for at least 30 weeks after being inoculated with Raffaelea spp., whereas nine of ten untreated control trees wilted in more than one-third of their crowns. Propiconazole was retained in the stem xylem for at least 7.5 months after injection but was more frequently detected in samples from trees injected 4.5 months earlier and was not well detected in small-diameter branches. Results suggest that propiconazole may be useful in preventing laurel wilt in redbay, but limitations and questions regarding duration of efficacy, rate of uptake, and efficacy under different levels of disease pressure remain.

In 2011, the EPA granted a Section 18 Emergency Exemption allowing the use of Tilt (a formulation of propiconazole) on commercial avocado trees to prevent laurel wilt disease. However, questions remain about the efficacy and cost-effectiveness of this treatment in commercial groves

=== Resistance in redbay trees ===
Some redbay trees may be resistant to the disease, and future research will investigate factors associated with resistance, in the hope that tolerant varieties can be identified and developed.

== See also ==
- Japanese oak wilt - caused by Raffaelea quercivora
