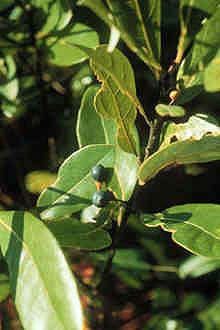
- Tamala borbonia leaves

Conservation status
- Endangered (IUCN 3.1)

Scientific classification
- Kingdom: Plantae
- Clade: Tracheophytes
- Clade: Angiosperms
- Clade: Magnoliids
- Order: Laurales
- Family: Lauraceae
- Genus: Tamala
- Species: T. borbonia

Binomial name
- Tamala borbonia (L.) Raf.
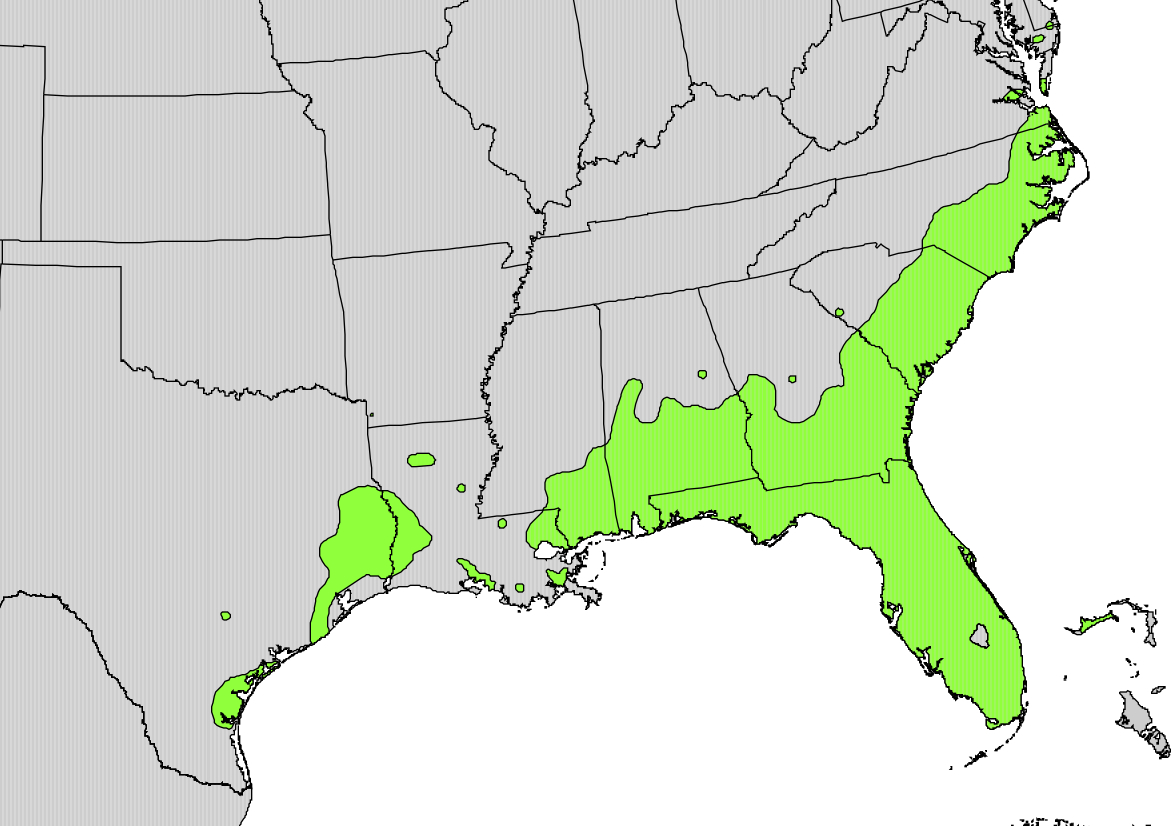
- Natural range

Synonyms
- Borbonia borbonia (L.) House; Borbonia carolinensis J.Presl; Borbonia littoralis (Small) House; Laurus borbonia L.; Laurus carolinensis Catesby ex Michx.; Laurus carolinensis var. glabra Pursh; Laurus carolinensis var. obtusa Pursh; Laurus elongata Salisb.; Laurus foetens Willd. ex Nees; Nothaphoebe borbonia (L.) Pax; Ocotea carolinensis Kostel.; Ocotea plumieri Kostel.; Persea borbonia (L.) Spreng.; Persea carolinensis (Catesby ex Michx.) Nees; Persea carolinensis f. glabriuscula (Meisn.) Mez; Persea carolinensis var. glabriuscula Meisn.; Persea littoralis Small; Tamala borbonia (L.) Raf.; Tamala carolinensis Raf.; Tamala littoralis (Small) Small

= Tamala borbonia =

Species of tree

Tamala borbonia or redbay is a small, evergreen tree in the laurel family (Lauraceae), native to the southeastern United States and the Bahamas. It belongs to the genus Tamala, which contains three species of evergreen trees native to the region. Tamala borbonia has several common names including tisswood, scrubbay, shorebay, and swampbay.

== Description ==
Tamala borbonia can grow as either a small tree or a large shrub. It has evergreen leaves that are about 3 to 6 inches long with a lance shape. The leaves are arranged alternately and emit a spicy smell when crushed. The leaves vary in color from bright green to dark green. These trees are capable of producing fruit that is a small, blue or black drupe. Redbay is a perennial, with a non-herbaceous stem that is lignified. The tree can live for 80 to 100 years

== Taxonomy ==
Tamala borbonia was originally described as Laurus borbonia by Carl Linnaeus in 1753. In the following years it was described as Laurus elongata by Richard Anthony Salisbury in 1796, Laurus carolinensis by André Michaux in 1803, and as Laurus carolinensis var. glabra by Frederick Traugott Pursh in 1814. In 1825, Kurt Polycarp Joachim Sprengel returned to using the specific name given by Linnaeus describing the plant as Persea borbonia. The binomial name Persea borbonia was adopted in 1996 at the formation of the Integrated Taxonomic Information System. Before the ITIS, however, other naming systems existed including the genus Tamala described by Constantine Samuel Rafinesque which included T. carolinensis and T. borbonia acting as geographic variants of redbay occurring on the mainland United States and the Bahamas respectively. In 2023, the genus Persea was found to be polyphyletic through genetic tests and Persea borbonia was separated into the Tamala genus as Tamala borbonia, along with T. palustris and T. humilis.

== Distribution ==
Tamala borbonia is native to the coastal margins of the southeastern United States and the Bahamas. It grows in the lowlands of Texas, Arkansas, Louisiana, Florida, Mississippi, Alabama, Georgia, South Carolina, and eastern North Carolina. Small, isolated populations can be found in coastal Virginia, and near the Maryland and Delaware state line. It also grows in the Bahamas and is cultivated in Hawaii. It usually grows on the borders of swamp land.

Due to an invasion of redbay ambrosia beetle in the Southern United States the tree is slowly dying out. The beetle was discovered in 2002 near Savannah, Georgia and it carries a laurel wilt fungal disease that is responsible for killing redbays. However, foresters agree the species will likely not go extinct in the southeastern U.S. since it appears to rejuvenate to some degree on its own.

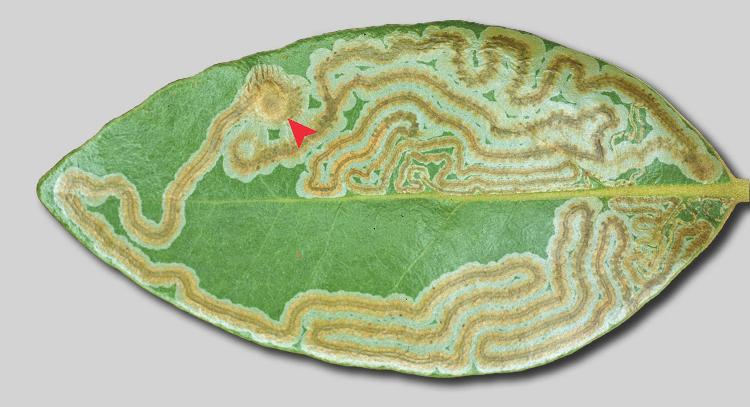
Tamala borbonia leaf with leaf mines by larvae of the moth Phyllocnistis hyperpersea.

== Uses ==
The plant is not widely used now for medicinal purposes, however members of the Seminole tribe formerly used it as an emetic to induce vomiting. The dried leaves can be used as a flavoring spice.

The wood is hard and strong and can be used to build boats, cabinets and for lining the interior of structures. The wood is not traded on a large scale so it is confined to the regions where T. borbonia grows.

=== Cultivation ===
Tamala borbonia is cultivated as an ornamental tree for gardens and parks.

=== Wildlife ===
Deer and bears also eat the leaves and fruits of redbay. Birds, including turkey, eat the plant's bitter fruit.

== See also ==
Bay tree (Laurus nobilis)
