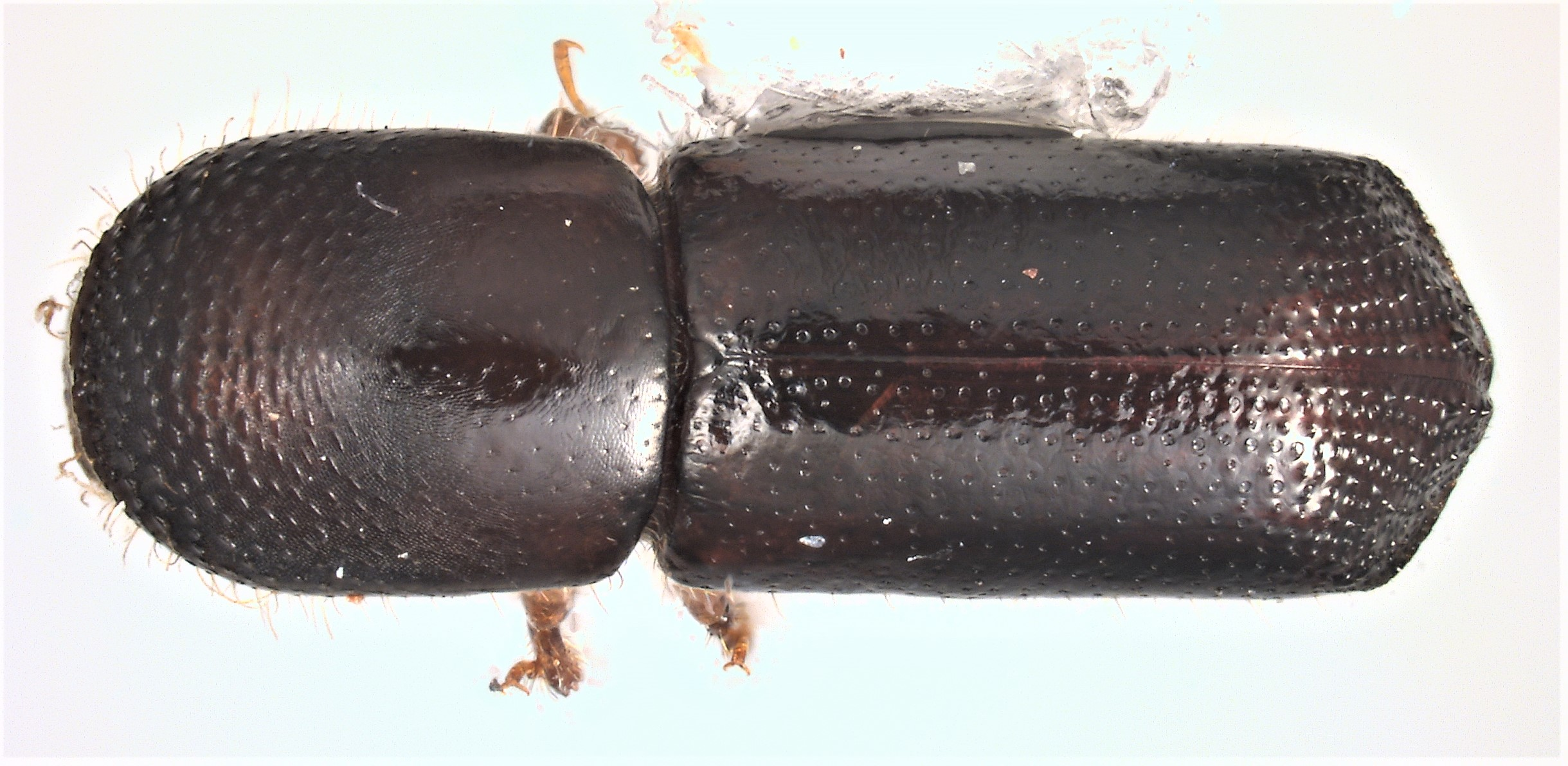

Scientific classification
- Kingdom: Animalia
- Phylum: Arthropoda
- Class: Insecta
- Order: Coleoptera
- Suborder: Polyphaga
- Infraorder: Cucujiformia
- Family: Curculionidae
- Genus: Xyleborus
- Species: X. glabratus

Binomial name
- Xyleborus glabratus Eichhoff, 1877

= Xyleborus glabratus =

Species of beetle

Xyleborus glabratus, the redbay ambrosia beetle, is a type of ambrosia beetle invasive in the United States. It has been documented as the primary vector of Raffaelea lauricola, the fungus that causes laurel wilt, a disease that can kill several North American tree species in the family Lauraceae, including redbay, sassafras, and avocado.

== Distribution ==
Xyleborus glabratus is native to Asia, including India, Japan, Myanmar, and Taiwan. It was first detected in the United States in 2002, and may have arrived in wood products, packing materials or pallets. X. glabratus and laurel wilt disease have since spread through much of the Gulf Coastal Plain and Atlantic Plain, ranging from eastern Texas and Arkansas to North Carolina, and in 2019 they were found in Kentucky and Tennessee.

== Identification ==
=== Adult ===
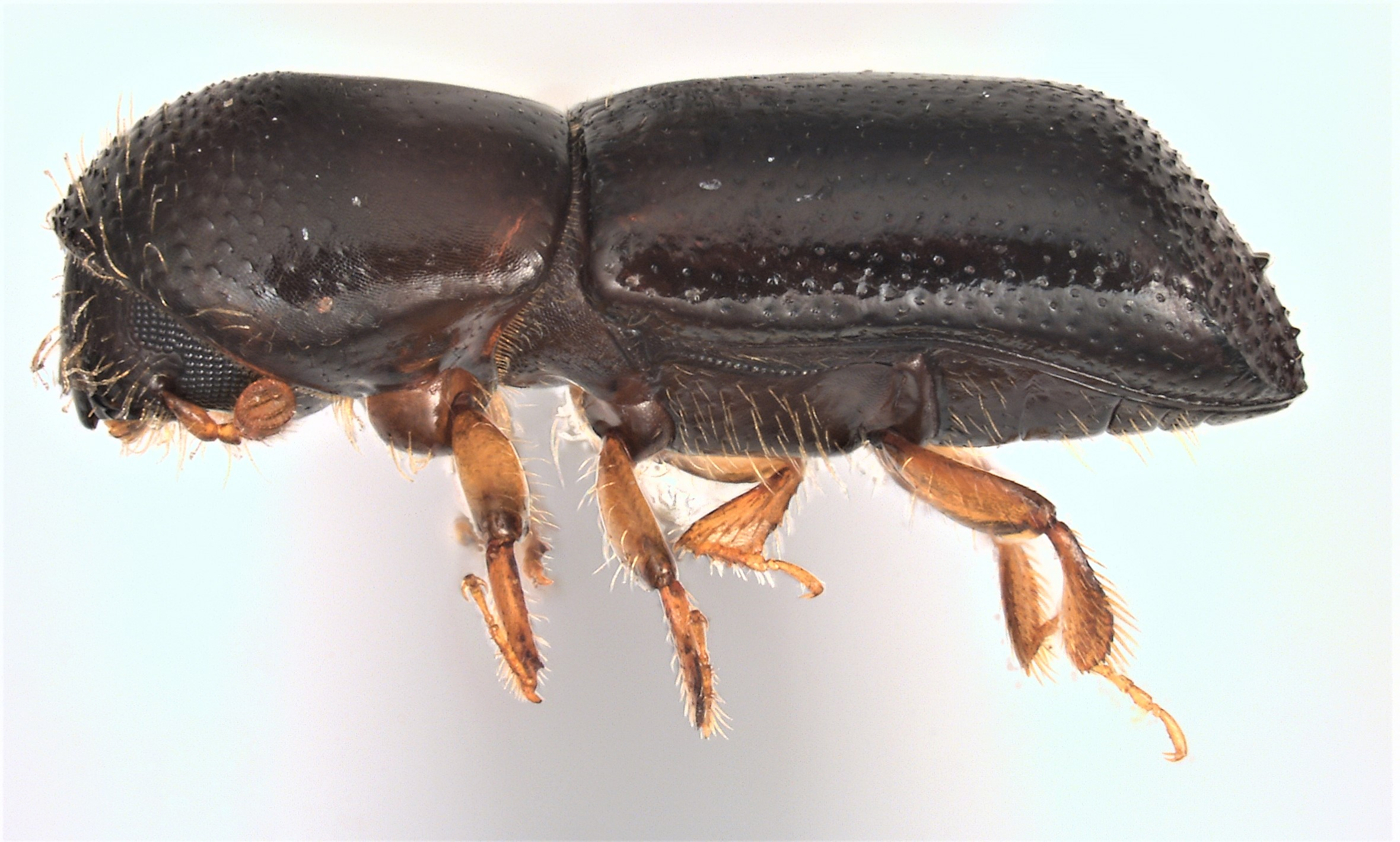
Lateral view of a female Xyleborus glabratus. Length: 2.2 mm.

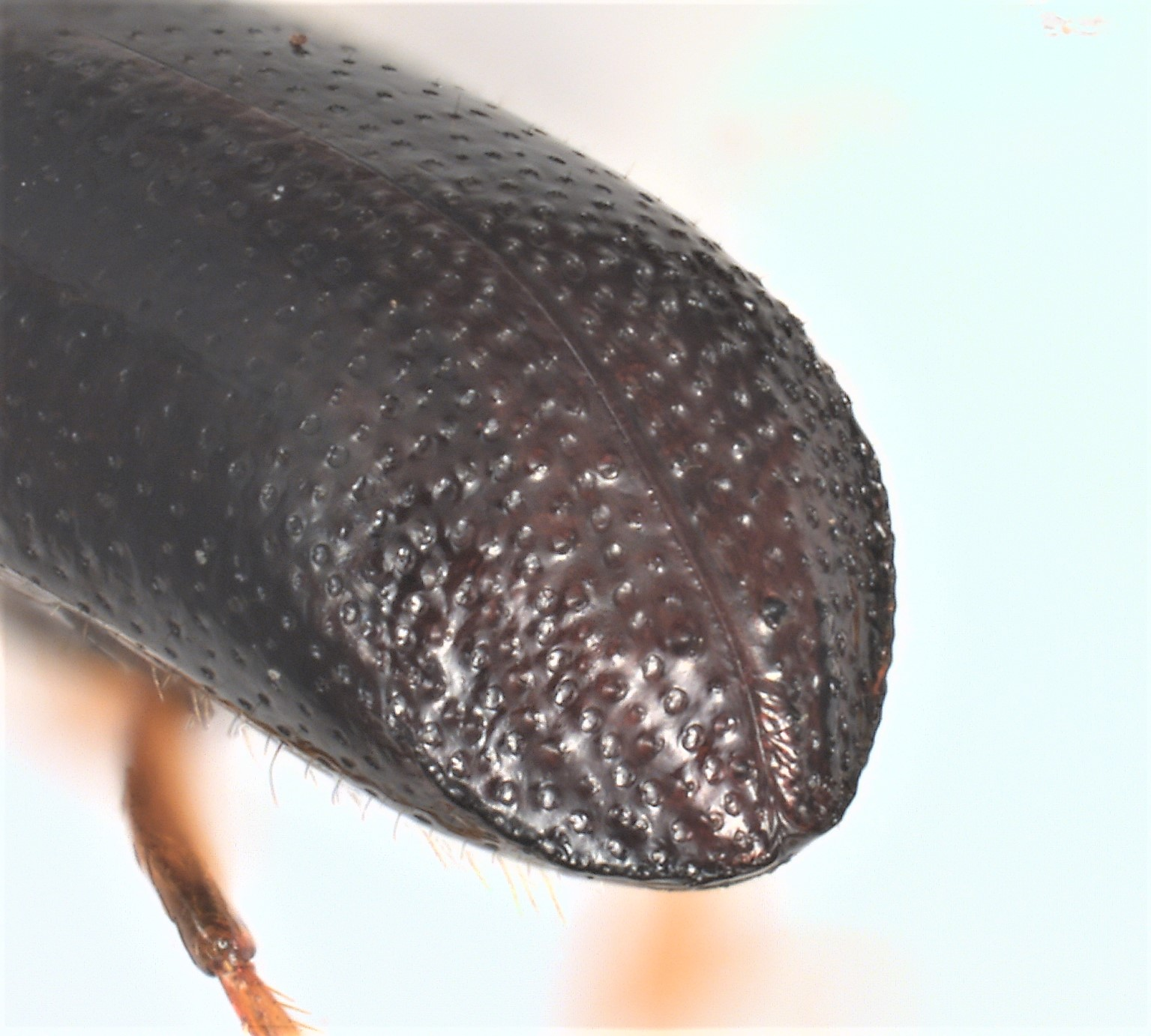
Elytral declivity of a female Xyleborus glabratus beetle.

The female redbay ambrosia beetle is a small (2.1 to 2.4 mm long), black or amber-brown, cigar-shaped beetle. The dorsal surface is mostly hairless and shiny when compared to other ambrosia beetles. They can be specifically identified by characters present on the elytral declivity, including its steep and convex shape when compared to other Xyleborus, and by the large size of indentations on the elytra.

=== Larvae and pupae ===
The larvae of the beetle are similar in appearance to others of the group, developing as a white and legless "worm" with an amber-colored head capsule. The pupae are whitish, exarate (with free appendages), and similar in size to the adult.

== Biology ==
The redbay ambrosia beetle is believed to originate from Asia or southeast Asia. Males are haploid, smaller in size, and flightless. The beetle's biology is poorly documented, but presumed to be similar to that of other ambrosia beetles, with larvae and adults feeding on the symbiotic fungus it carries with it, and not the wood of the host tree. The spores of the fungus are carried in mycangia at the base of each mandible.

Larval development time takes from fifty to sixty days. Studied populations increase steadily in size until late summer and early fall without distinct population peaks, leading researchers to believe that there are overlapping generations with year-round reproduction for the insect.

== History of expansion ==
The redbay ambrosia beetle can spread in at least two ways: one is via the beetle's natural reproduction and migration. A second way is through the sale and transport of beetle-infested wood, a result of redbay's use as firewood and for outdoor grilling.

The beetle was first detected in the United States in 2002, in Port Wentworth, Georgia. It has been suggested that this insect was introduced to the country on the wood of packing crates. The significance of these detections became apparent when the beetle was linked to and identified as the vector of laurel wilt, a fungal disease that had been killing large numbers of redbay trees. The fungus grows throughout the xylem of the tree, preventing the flow of water and nutrients throughout the plant. Host tree death can occur from four to eleven weeks after inoculation.

== See also ==
- Ambrosia beetle
- Euwallacea fornicatus
- Laurel wilt disease
- Forest pathology
