= List of Ambrosiodmus species =

This is a list of 100 species in Ambrosiodmus, a genus of typical bark beetles in the family Curculionidae.

== Ambrosiodmus species ==
- Ambrosiodmus addendus Wood & Bright, 1992^{c}
- Ambrosiodmus adustus Wood & Bright, 1992^{c}
- Ambrosiodmus aegir Wood & Bright, 1992^{c}
- Ambrosiodmus albizzianus Wood & Bright, 1992^{c}
- Ambrosiodmus alexae Wood, 2007^{c}
- Ambrosiodmus alsapanicus Wood & Bright, 1992^{c}
- Ambrosiodmus anepotulus Wood & Bright, 1992^{c}
- Ambrosiodmus apicalis Wood & Bright, 1992^{c}
- Ambrosiodmus artegranulatus Wood & Bright, 1992^{c}
- Ambrosiodmus asperatus Wood & Bright, 1992^{c}
- Ambrosiodmus bispinosulus Wood & Bright, 1992^{c}
- Ambrosiodmus bostrichoides Wood & Bright, 1992^{c}
- Ambrosiodmus brunneipes Wood & Bright, 1992^{c}
- Ambrosiodmus camphorae Wood & Bright, 1992^{c}
- Ambrosiodmus catharinensis Wood & Bright, 1992^{c}
- Ambrosiodmus coffeiceus Wood & Bright, 1992^{c}
- Ambrosiodmus colossus Wood & Bright, 1992^{c}
- Ambrosiodmus compressus Wood & Bright, 1992^{c}
- Ambrosiodmus consimilis Wood & Bright, 1992^{c}
- Ambrosiodmus conspectus Wood & Bright, 1992^{c}
- Ambrosiodmus declivispinatus Wood & Bright, 1992^{c}
- Ambrosiodmus devexulus (Wood, 1978)^{i c}
- Ambrosiodmus devexus Wood & Bright, 1992^{c}
- Ambrosiodmus diversipennis Wood & Bright, 1992^{c}
- Ambrosiodmus eichhoffi Wood & Bright, 1992^{c}
- Ambrosiodmus facetus Wood & Bright, 1992^{c}
- Ambrosiodmus ferus Wood, 1986c^{c}
- Ambrosiodmus fraterculus Wood & Bright, 1992^{c}
- Ambrosiodmus funebris Wood & Bright, 1992^{c}
- Ambrosiodmus funereus Wood & Bright, 1992^{c}
- Ambrosiodmus funestus Wood & Bright, 1992^{c}
- Ambrosiodmus guatemalensis Hopkins, 1915b^{c}
- Ambrosiodmus gundlachi Eggers, 1931^{g}
- Ambrosiodmus hagedorni Wood & Bright, 1992^{c}
- Ambrosiodmus himalayensis Schedl (Eggers in), 1964k^{c}
- Ambrosiodmus incertus Wood & Bright, 1992^{c}
- Ambrosiodmus inferior Wood & Bright, 1992^{c}
- Ambrosiodmus innominatus Wood & Bright, 1992^{c}
- Ambrosiodmus inoblitus Wood & Bright, 1992^{c}
- Ambrosiodmus inopinatus Wood & Bright, 1992^{c}
- Ambrosiodmus katangensis Bright & Skidmore, 2002^{c}
- Ambrosiodmus klapperichi Bright, 1985c^{c}
- Ambrosiodmus latecompressus Wood & Bright, 1992^{c}
- Ambrosiodmus lecontei Hopkins, 1915^{i c b}
- Ambrosiodmus lewisi Wood & Bright, 1992^{c b}
- Ambrosiodmus linderae Hopkins, 1915b^{c}
- Ambrosiodmus loebli Wood & Bright, 1992^{c}
- Ambrosiodmus luteus Bright & Skidmore, 2002^{c}
- Ambrosiodmus mahafali Wood & Bright, 1992^{c}
- Ambrosiodmus mamibillae Wood & Bright, 1992^{c}
- Ambrosiodmus minor Wood & Bright, 1992^{c b}
- Ambrosiodmus natalensis Wood & Bright, 1992^{c}
- Ambrosiodmus neglectus Wood & Bright, 1992^{c}
- Ambrosiodmus nepocranus Wood & Bright, 1992^{c}
- Ambrosiodmus nigripennis Wood & Bright, 1992^{c}
- Ambrosiodmus nodulosus Wood & Bright, 1992^{c}
- Ambrosiodmus obliquecaudata Wood & Bright, 1992^{c}
- Ambrosiodmus obliquus (LeConte, 1878)^{i c}
- Ambrosiodmus ocellatus Wood & Bright, 1992^{c}
- Ambrosiodmus opacithorax Wood & Bright, 1992^{c}
- Ambrosiodmus opimus (Wood, 1974)^{i c}
- Ambrosiodmus optatus Wood & Bright, 1992^{c}
- Ambrosiodmus ovatus Wood & Bright, 1992^{c}
- Ambrosiodmus pardous Wood, 2007^{c}
- Ambrosiodmus paucus Wood, 1986c^{c}
- Ambrosiodmus pellitus Wood & Bright (Schedl in), 1992^{c}
- Ambrosiodmus permarginatus Wood & Bright, 1992^{c}
- Ambrosiodmus pernodulus Schedl, 1957d^{c}
- Ambrosiodmus pertortuosus Wood & Bright, 1992^{c}
- Ambrosiodmus pithecolobius Wood & Bright, 1992^{c}
- Ambrosiodmus pseudocitri Wood & Bright, 1992^{c}
- Ambrosiodmus pseudocolossus Wood & Bright, 1992^{c}
- Ambrosiodmus raucus Wood & Bright, 1992^{c}
- Ambrosiodmus restrictus Wood & Bright, 1992^{c}
- Ambrosiodmus rhodesianus Wood & Bright, 1992^{c}
- Ambrosiodmus rubricollis (Eichhoff, 1875)^{i c g b}
- Ambrosiodmus rugicollis Wood & Bright, 1992^{c}
- Ambrosiodmus rusticus Wood & Bright, 1992^{c}
- Ambrosiodmus sakoae Wood & Bright, 1992^{c}
- Ambrosiodmus sandragotoensis Wood & Bright, 1992^{c}
- Ambrosiodmus sarawakensis Wood & Bright, 1992^{c}
- Ambrosiodmus scalaris Wood & Bright, 1992^{c}
- Ambrosiodmus semicarinatus Wood & Bright, 1992^{c}
- Ambrosiodmus sexdentatus Wood & Bright, 1992^{c}
- Ambrosiodmus signiceps Wood & Bright, 1992^{c}
- Ambrosiodmus signifer Wood & Bright, 1992^{c}
- Ambrosiodmus subnepotulus Wood & Bright, 1992^{c}
- Ambrosiodmus sulcatus Wood & Bright, 1992^{c}
- Ambrosiodmus tachygraphus (Zimmermann, 1868)^{i c b}
- Ambrosiodmus tenebrosus Wood & Bright, 1992^{c}
- Ambrosiodmus tomicoides Wood & Bright, 1992^{c}
- Ambrosiodmus tortuosus Wood & Bright, 1992^{c}
- Ambrosiodmus triton Wood & Bright, 1992^{c}
- Ambrosiodmus trolaki Wood & Bright, 1992^{c}
- Ambrosiodmus tropicus Wood & Bright, 1992^{c}
- Ambrosiodmus trux Wood & Bright, 1992^{c}
- Ambrosiodmus turgidus Wood & Bright, 1992^{c}
- Ambrosiodmus upoluensis Wood & Bright, 1992^{c}
- Ambrosiodmus vaspatorius Eggers (Hagedorn in), 1923a^{c}
- Ambrosiodmus wilderi Wood & Bright, 1992^{c}

Data sources: i = ITIS, c = Catalogue of Life, g = GBIF, b = Bugguide.net
