= Cnestus gravidus =

Scientific classification
- Kingdom: Animalia
- Phylum: Arthropoda
- Clade: Pancrustacea
- Class: Insecta
- Order: Coleoptera
- Suborder: Polyphaga
- Infraorder: Cucujiformia
- Superfamily: Curculionoidea
- Family: Curculionidae
- Genus: Cnestus
- Species: C. gravidus

Binomial name
- Cnestus gravidus (Blanford, 1898)

Synonyms
- Xyleborus gravidus Blanford, 1898; Xylosandrus gravidus (Blanford): Wood & Bright, 1992

Species of beetle

Cnestus gravidus is a species of weevil found in Sri Lanka, India, Bangladesh, Nepal, Myanmar, Laos, Thailand, Vietnam, and China.

== Description ==
Average body length is about 5.0 to 5.5 mm. There is a mesonotal mycangial tuft found on the pronotal base. Elytral disc is short and elytral declivity is obliquely truncate. Elytral interstriae is granulate with a median row of long erect hairs.
