= Coptodryas elegans =

Scientific classification
- Kingdom: Animalia
- Phylum: Arthropoda
- Clade: Pancrustacea
- Class: Insecta
- Order: Coleoptera
- Suborder: Polyphaga
- Infraorder: Cucujiformia
- Superfamily: Curculionoidea
- Family: Curculionidae
- Subfamily: Scolytinae
- Genus: Coptodryas
- Species: C. elegans

Binomial name
- Coptodryas elegans (Sampson, 1923)

Synonyms
- Coptodryas concinnus; Coptodryas flexiocostatus; Xyleborus elegans, Sampson, 1923

Species of beetle

Coptodryas elegans is a species of ambrosia beetles in the tribe Xyleborini (highly specialized weevils of the subfamily Scolytinae). It is found in Asia (Burma, India, Indonesia) and the Pacific. The type locality is Raja Bhat Khawa in Bengal. It can be found on Albizzia moluccana, Eugenia jambolana, Lansium sp. and Shorea robusta.

== Footnotes ==
- "Coptodryas elegans". The Encyclopedia of Life.
- Coptodryas elegans at xyleborini.speciesfile.org
