= Webbia =

Webbia may refer to:

- Hypericum sect. Webbia, the taxonomic section Webbia within the genus Hypericum
- Webbia (journal), a scientific journal published by the University of Florence
- Webbia (beetle), an ambrosia beetle genus in the tribe Xyleborini
