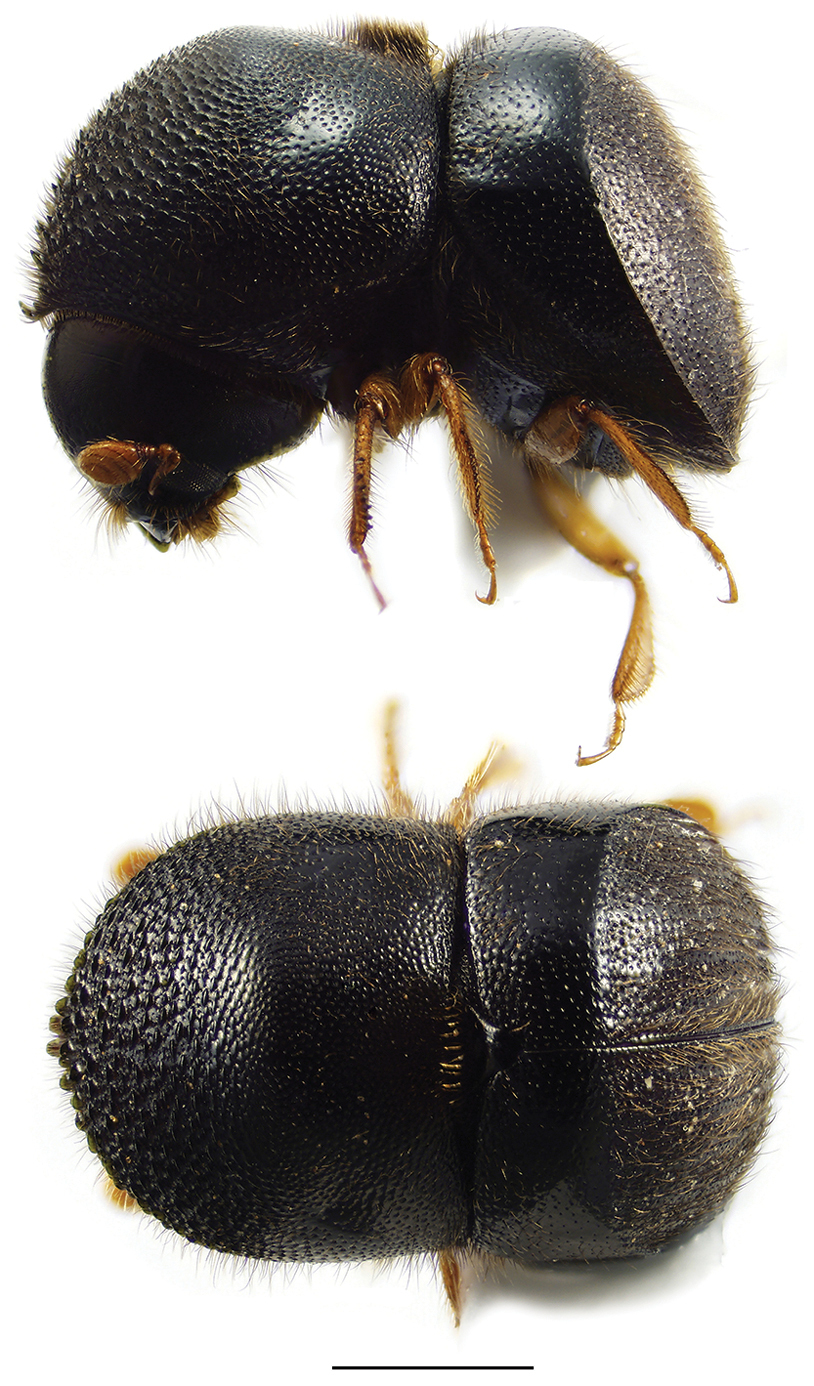
- Cnestus mutilatus

Scientific classification
- Kingdom: Animalia
- Phylum: Arthropoda
- Clade: Pancrustacea
- Class: Insecta
- Order: Coleoptera
- Suborder: Polyphaga
- Infraorder: Cucujiformia
- Superfamily: Curculionoidea
- Family: Curculionidae
- Subfamily: Scolytinae
- Genus: Cnestus
- Species: C. mutilatus

Binomial name
- Cnestus mutilatus (Blandford, 1894)

Synonyms
- Xylosandrus mutilatus (Blandford); Xyleborus mutilatus Blandford; Xyleborus sampsoni Eggers; Xyleborus bangoewangi Schedl; Xyleborus taitonus Eggers

= Cnestus mutilatus =

Species of beetle

Cnestus mutilatus, commonly known as the camphor shot borer, camphor shoot borer, or sweetgum ambrosia beetle, is a species of ambrosia beetle in the subfamily Scolytinae of the weevil family Curculionidae. It is native to Asia, but has been established as an invasive species in the United States since 1999.

== Description ==
Cnestus mutilatus adult females are mainly black in color, and are large and robust compared to most ambrosia beetles, ranging from 3.4 to 3.9 mm in length, and about 1.7 times longer than wide. This makes C. mutilatus the largest ambrosia beetle species found in North America. Their body shape is also distinctive compared to most ambrosia beetles, with an abdomen that is shorter than the head and thorax, and a sharp slope to the posterior end that gives them a severed or "squished" appearance. Adult male beetles are smaller, and flightless.

== Distribution ==
Cnestus mutilatus is native to Asia, where it is known from Burma, China, India, Indonesia, Japan, Korea, Malaysia, New Guinea, Sri Lanka, and Thailand. In 1999, it was collected in traps in Mississippi (USA), and subsequent survey work found it to be widely established there. It has since spread throughout much of the eastern United States, from Florida north to Pennsylvania, and west to Illinois and Texas.

== Ecology and behavior ==
Like other ambrosia beetles, Cnestus mutilatus carries a symbiotic species of fungus that it introduces into the host plant, and which serves as the primary food source for the adult beetles and larvae; the ambrosia fungus associated with C. mutilatus is Ambrosiella beaveri.

The female beetle tunnels directly through the bark and into the wood of the host tree's branches, attacking stems that are relatively small (typically 1 to 5 cm in diameter), and entering through circular holes that are about 2 mm in diameter. Their galleries (tunnels) typically extend horizontally into the stem for a short distance, before branching into long (up to 3.8 cm) vertical tunnels.

== Damage to fuel containers ==
Cnestus mutilatus has been documented as damaging vessels and lines containing gasoline fuel, such as plastic fuel storage containers, lawnmower components, and boat fuel lines. They tunnel in through the plastic, creating small (~2 mm), circular entrance holes. This "accidental" damage (which often results in the death of the beetle) is apparently due to the fact that standard gasoline fuel in the United States contains up to 10% ethanol, which is a primary attractant of C. mutilatus, as a chemical released by stressed host trees.
