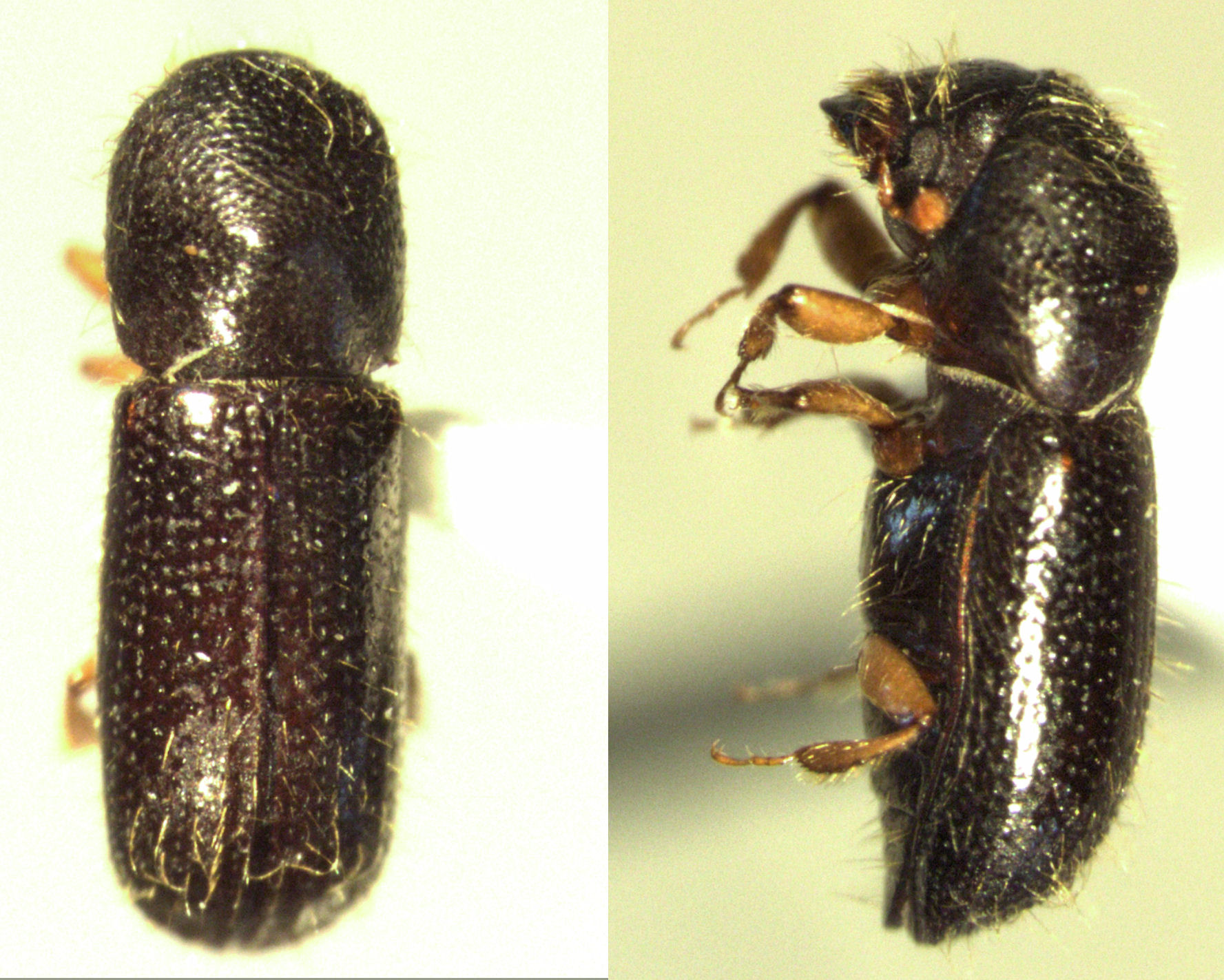
- Xyleborus inurbanus (female)

Scientific classification
- Kingdom: Animalia
- Phylum: Arthropoda
- Class: Insecta
- Order: Coleoptera
- Suborder: Polyphaga
- Infraorder: Cucujiformia
- Family: Curculionidae
- Subfamily: Scolytinae
- Tribe: Xyleborini
- Genus: Xyleborus; Eichhoff, 1864

Species
- About 535, see text

Synonyms
- Anaeretus Duges, 1887; Anisandrus Ferrari, 1867; Boroxylon Hopkins, 1915; Heteroborips Reitter, 1913; Mesoscolytus Broun, 1904; Notoxyleborus Schedl, 1934; Phloeotrogus Motschulsky, 1863; Progenius Blandford, 1896; Xyleborips Reitter, 1913

= Xyleborus (beetle) =

Genus of beetles

Xyleborus is by far the largest ambrosia beetle genus in the tribe Xyleborini, with over 500 species.

Xyleborus nowadays includes a number of formerly independent genera. In addition, the genera Coptoborus, Cryptoxyleborus and Euwallacea are often included here, too; this may be correct, as they seem to be closely related. Less often, Ambrosiodmus, Premnobius and Xyleborinus are included in Xyleborus, but they seem to be well distinct; Premnobius might even not belong to the Xyleborini at all.

The different species can be best differentiated by the gallery burrows they build and the tree species they infest. A significant member, X. dispar, causes pear blight.

== Selected species ==
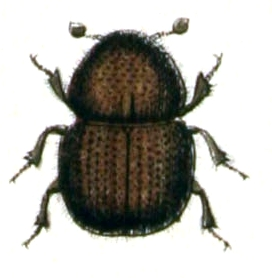
X. dispar

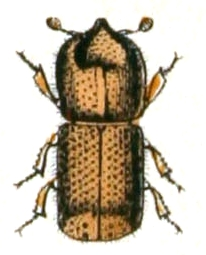
X. monographus

- Xyleborus affinis Eichhoff, 1868
- Xyleborus atratus Eichhoff, 1875
- Xyleborus californicus Wood, 1975 - may belong in Cyclorhipidion
- Xyleborus celsus Eichhoff, 1868
- Xyleborus cryptographus (Ratzeburg, 1837)
- Xyleborus dispar (Fabricius, 1792)
- Xyleborus dryographus (Ratzeburg, 1837)
- Xyleborus eurygraphus (Ratzeburg, 1837)
- Xyleborus ferrugineus (Fabricius, 1801)
- Xyleborus glabratus Eichhoff, 1877
- Xyleborus horridus Eichhoff, 1869
- Xyleborus impressus Eichhoff, 1868
- Xyleborus intrusus Blandford, 1898
- Xyleborus inurbanus (Broun, 1880)
- Xyleborus monographus (Fabricius, 1792)
- Xyleborus obesus LeConte, 1868
- Xyleborus pelliculosus Eichhoff, 1878 - may belong in Cyclorhipidion
- Xyleborus perforans (Wollaston, 1857)
- Xyleborus pfeilii (Ratzeburg, 1837)
- Xyleborus planicollis Zimmermann, 1868
- Xyleborus pubescens Zimmermann, 1868
- Xyleborus sayi (Hopkins, 1915)
- Xyleborus similis Ferrari, 1867
- Xyleborus viduus Eichhoff, 1878
- Xyleborus volvulus (Fabricius, 1775)
- Xyleborus xylographus (Say, 1826)

== See also ==
- List of Xyleborus species
