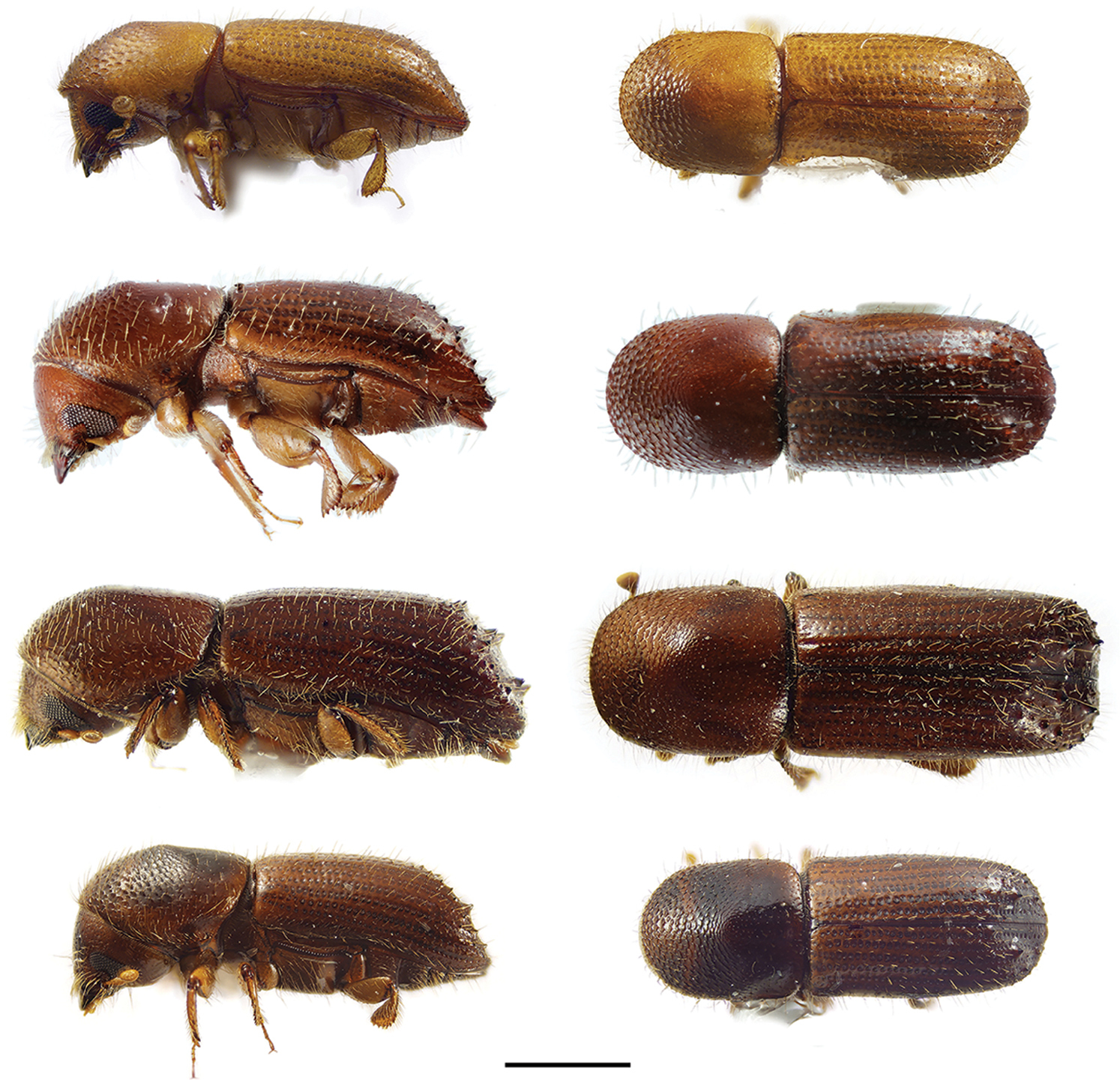

Scientific classification
- Kingdom: Animalia
- Phylum: Arthropoda
- Clade: Pancrustacea
- Class: Insecta
- Order: Coleoptera
- Suborder: Polyphaga
- Infraorder: Cucujiformia
- Superfamily: Curculionoidea
- Family: Curculionidae
- Genus: Xyleborus
- Species: X. affinis

Binomial name
- Xyleborus affinis Eichhoff, 1868

= Xyleborus affinis =

Species of beetle

Xyleborus affinis, the sugarcane shot-hole borer, is a species of ambrosia beetle in the family Curculionidae. It is found on all continents with woodlands and is one of the most widespread ambrosia beetles internationally, primarily in areas with humid tropical climates like Florida. Like other ambrosia beetles, Xyleborus affinis is attracted to dead fallen logs in early stages of decay. Due to the presence of X. affinis on moist timber, this species is mistakenly believed to be the cause of tree death. However, there is insufficient evidence to support their presence as a causal factor. Rather, these beetles are believed to target and accelerate the decay process of trees that are already deteriorated and weak.

Similar to other species of ambrosia beetles, Xyleborus affinis lives in symbiosis with ambrosia fungi and dig tunnels (formally known as galleries) into the xylem of decaying trees where the fungus is then grown. Female eggs are laid in these fungus-lined galleries and use the fungus as a food source.

How prominent sexual dimorphism is in this species is highly dependant on temperature conditions during development, with individuals that were reared under high temperatures having less pronounced sexually dimorphic traits than those that were reared under lower temperature conditions.

== Subspecies ==
These two subspecies belong to the species Xyleborus affinis:

- Xyleborus affinis affinis
- Xyleborus affinis mascarensis Eichhoff, 1878

== Range ==
In the United Status, Xyleborus affinis is found all over the east coast, ranging from Michigan in the north to Florida in the south and even to Texas in the west. This species is also found in regions of South and Central America, such as the Antilles, Belize, Costa Rica, El Salvador, Guatemala, Honduras, Mexico, Nicaragua, Panama, and Argentina. The species has also spread into Africa, Asia, Australia, Europe, and the Pacific Islands such as Hawaii.

Xyleborus affinis originates in the American tropics, and is especially abundant in tropical climates like Florida, it currently inhabits the majority of international tropical and subtropical regions. Similar to other beetle species that inoculate wood, Xyleborus affinis is easily transmitted via wood distribution and international trade.

== Characteristics ==
=== Adults ===
This species is yellowish to reddish brown in color and resembles the morphology of other Xyleborus species with its elongated, cylindrical body. Xyleborus adults are sexually dimorphic, which means that the size, shape, and structure of bodily characteristics differ between males and females. Females are, on average, 2.0–2.7 mm long and are larger than males, which are typically 1.7–2.0 mm long. In contrast to females, males do not have wings, have smaller eyes and antennae, and are less numerous in the population. Although the female to male sex ratio has been reported as 14 to 1 in a study by Roeper et al. (2017), it widely varies and has not yet definitively been identified.

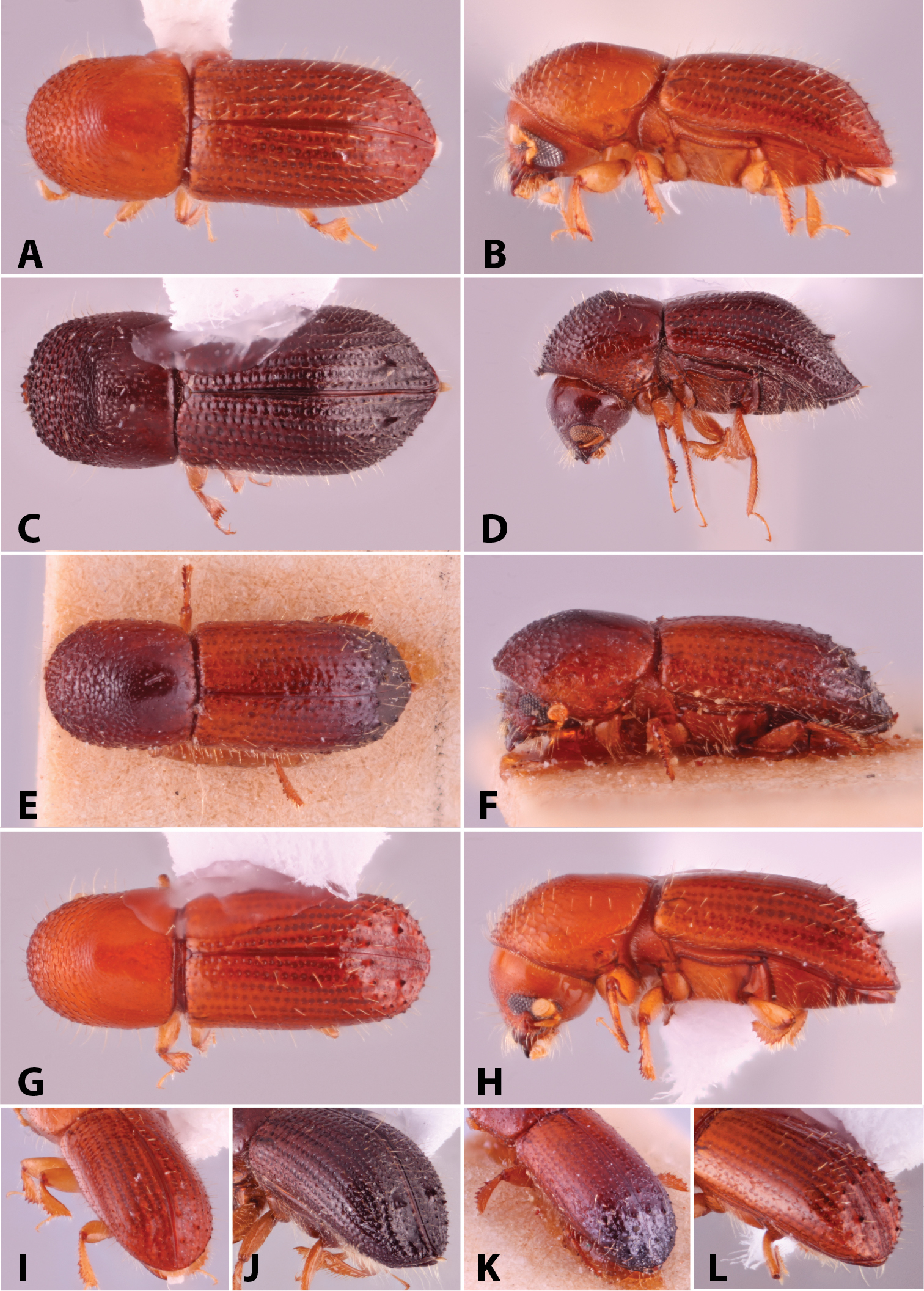
Different views of adult Xyleborus affinis

This species very closely resembles Xyleborus perforans Wollaston and Xyleborus volvulus Fabricius, both of which are found in Florida.Xyleborus affinis is unique based on the downward slant of its abdomen at the end of its elytra. In Xyleborus affinis, the surface of this declivity is dull and nontransparent, whereas it is shiny and smooth in the other two species.

=== Eggs ===
The eggs are ivory-colored, ellipsoidal, and shiny and vary in length from 0.6 to 1.0 mm with an average of 0.718 mm. Females lay eggs in groups of two to four along the fungus-lined horizontal galleries that extend horizontally away from the main vertical tunnels. At 29 °C, eggs can be laid anywhere from three to 27 days after introduction into the host log.

=== Larvae ===
Larvae are white, have a slightly bent shape, and do not have legs. At 29 °C, larvae take 7–14 days to hatch, whereas they take14–35 days to hatch at 22–24 °C. Larvae are nourished solely from the symbiotic fungus inhabiting the galleries.

=== Pupae ===
Pupae are initially white, but they become light brown in color just before they appear as adults. On average, males are 2.0 mm long and shorter than females, which are 2.7 mm long. At 29 °C, it takes larvae 11-23 days to mature into pupae, whereas it takes 21–35 days at 22–24 °C. At 29 °C, it takes adults 18-35 to surface, whereas it takes 27–35 days at 22–24 °C.

== Ecology ==
=== Hosts ===
Xyleborus affinis is found in natural woodlands and inhabits damp logs on the ground. Even though this species is one of the most common ambrosia beetles found in wooded regions, its population size is often grossly underestimated. The beetles inoculate large trees in a series of stages, first inhabiting dead phloem and then moving onto the xylem, which is where most eggs are laid.

Although Xyleborus affinis is not particular about choosing the species of its host tree, it is selective based on how deteriorated and damp the fallen log is. These beetles favor large and moist pieces of wood that are early on in the decay process, which is believed to be due to the symbiotic fungus' moisture requirement for survival. As a result, these beetles are especially plentiful in logs partially immersed in water or lying on moist ground.

=== Symbiosis ===
The female beetles have a specialized pocket inside their mouths, known as mycangium, where they maintain a population of fungal symbiont. This fungus gets injected inside the galleries the females create, allowing for a mutualistic symbiosis. Until they become adults, larvae will continue to feed on the spore-containing fungi.

Ethanol is the most popularly used chemicals that attracts ambrosia beetles and is used in observational studies. However, Xyleborus affinis is not strongly drawn toward ethanol and is thus more difficult to monitor.

== Reproduction ==
Like all other Xyleborus beetles, Xyleborus affinis is haplodiploid. In this sex-determination system, females develop from fertilized eggs with a diploid set of DNA from both their mother and father, whereas males develop from unfertilized eggs and are born haploid, containing DNA from only their mother. Additionally, Xyleborus affinis is inbred. Because males remain confined to their original host tree and their only purpose is to fertilize nearby females, many of these eggs are their sisters. After becoming adults, females will either continue reproducing in the host log or, if the current log is too decomposed, will look for a new host. In contrast to most ambrosia beetles in which each generation seeks a new host, Xyleborus affinis' ability to maintain consecutive populations in the same log is atypical.

== Sexual dimorphism ==
=== In the genus ===
The phenomenon of sexual dimorphism within Xyleborus genus, particularly in terms of size and distinct categorical traits, has been thoroughly established. In research conducted by Ospina-Garcés, Sandra M., et al. (2021), an analysis was carried out to assess the differences in size and shape of the elytra and pronotum between sexes. The findings indicated that sex does not affect how size influences shape differences in these body parts, with the degree of shape variation attributable to similar centroid size between the sexes and the two structures examined. A significant correlation was identified between the shapes of the pronotum and elytra, suggesting a coordinated development of body shape in these beetles. Furthermore, while both the elytra and pronotum exhibit sexual dimorphism in size and shape, this difference is more pronounced in the shape of the pronotum compared to the elytra. The study also revealed contrasting patterns of shape variation in relation to centroid size for each structure: a negative allometric trend was observed for elytra shape from males to females, where as a positive allometric trend was observed for pronotum shape from males to females.

=== In the species ===
The findings reveal that structural differences in the elytra and pronotum vary in a coordinated manner. However, the pronotum demonstrates greater variation in shape and therefore a higher degree of sexual dimorphism in both size and shape compared to the elytra. Prior studies, including observations in X. affinis, have noted sexual size dimorphism in the pronotum, with females displaying a larger size than males when measured using traditional methods of length and width.

An additional study by Ospina-Garcés, Sandra M., et al. (2021) detected a notable sexual dimorphism in X. affinis, with males possessing shorter and wider mandibles compared to females, as well as exhibiting an apophysis on the external contour of the mandible. This dimorphism is thought to be influenced by the species' haplodiploid sex determination system and prevalence of inbreeding, as well as the fact that only females spread out and colonize.

==== Effect of temperature ====
The same study evaluated the effect of different temperatures on the development of head size and mandible shape throughout the growth stages of X. affinis. It suggests that the temperature in which the larvae grow contributes to head size variation, where a narrower mandible size range was observed at higher temperatures (width: 0.12–0.40 mm), while lower temperatures allowed for a wider range of mandible sizes (width: 0.11–0.49 mm). It was also found that mandible size variation was linked to changes in larval instars through four distinct ontogenesis stages, regardless of the temperature conditions.

Regarding the extent and pattern of sexual dimorphism in mandible shape and size, the study found that the differences between sexes were minimized at higher temperatures, whereas more variable patterns of dimorphism were observed at lower and medium temperatures. The most pronounced disparities in mandible shape between sexes were recorded at 23 °C, and the largest size differences at 26 °C. These findings suggest that extreme temperatures outside optimal temperature ranges (23 °C and 29 °C) may induce phenotypic variations in mandible shape between sexes, potentially affecting their functionality.

== Damage ==
Although the inoculation of Xyleborus affinis on fallen logs can accelerate the decay process, these beetles typically seek out weak and injured timber that are already deteriorating. As a result, the presence of these beetles alone is typically not believed to cause decomposition.

Xyleborus affinis is gaining attention in the context of plant diseases based on its ability to transmit disease-causing fungi, such as the causal agent of laurel wilt disease, between different plant species. When these beetles burrow into trees in the Laurel family, they transfer the fungal seeds to the trees. These spores proceed to contaminate the xylem bu cutting off the vascular system, leading to wilting and mortality in as quick as weeks to months after inoculation.

Xyleborus affinis can also compromise the structural integrity of freshly cut natural wood more than any other ambrosia species because of its family arrangement and labor division. In most ambrosia beetle species, the mother is solely responsible for burrowing galleries, but in Xyleborus affinis, the daughter females help expand the tunnel system as well. This allows numerous gallery systems to be formed, both superficially and deep within the xylem.
