= Coptodryas =

Scientific classification
- Kingdom: Animalia
- Phylum: Arthropoda
- Class: Insecta
- Order: Coleoptera
- Suborder: Polyphaga
- Infraorder: Cucujiformia
- Family: Curculionidae
- Tribe: Xyleborini
- Genus: Coptodryas; Hopkins 1915

Species
- See text

Genus of beetles

Coptodryas is a genus of ambrosia beetles in the tribe Xyleborini (highly specialized weevils of the subfamily Scolytinae).

== Species ==
- Coptodryas abbreviata
- Coptodryas alpha
- Coptodryas amphicauda
- Coptodryas artegrapha
- Coptodryas atava
- Coptodryas bella
- Coptodryas borneensis
- Coptodryas brunnea
- Coptodryas camela
- Coptodryas chimbui
- Coptodryas chrysophylli
- Coptodryas compta
- Coptodryas confusa Hopkins, 1915
- Coptodryas corporaali
- Coptodryas costipennis
- Coptodryas curvidentis
- Coptodryas cylindrica
- Coptodryas destricta
- Coptodryas diversicolor
- Coptodryas docta
- Coptodryas elegans
- Coptodryas erinacea
- Coptodryas eucalyptica
- Coptodryas exsculpta
- Coptodryas extensa
- Coptodryas gorontalosa
- Coptodryas huangi
- Coptodryas hylurgoides Schedl, 1948
- Coptodryas intermedias
- Coptodryas izuensis
- Coptodryas judenkoi
- Coptodryas kirishimana
- Coptodryas libra
- Coptodryas muasi
- Coptodryas mus
- Coptodryas myllus
- Coptodryas myristicae
- Coptodryas nitellus
- Coptodryas nudibrevis
- Coptodryas nudipennis
- Coptodryas nugax
- Coptodryas obtusicollis
- Coptodryas parva
- Coptodryas pedella
- Coptodryas perparva
- Coptodryas pometiana
- Coptodryas popondettae
- Coptodryas pubipennis
- Coptodryas pulla
- Coptodryas punctipennis
- Coptodryas quadricostata
- Coptodryas recidens
- Coptodryas rosseli
- Coptodryas semistriata
- Coptodryas tenella
- Coptodryas undulata
- Coptodryas vafra

== Footnotes ==
- "Coptodryas". The Encyclopedia of Life.
- Data related to Coptodryas at Wikispecies
