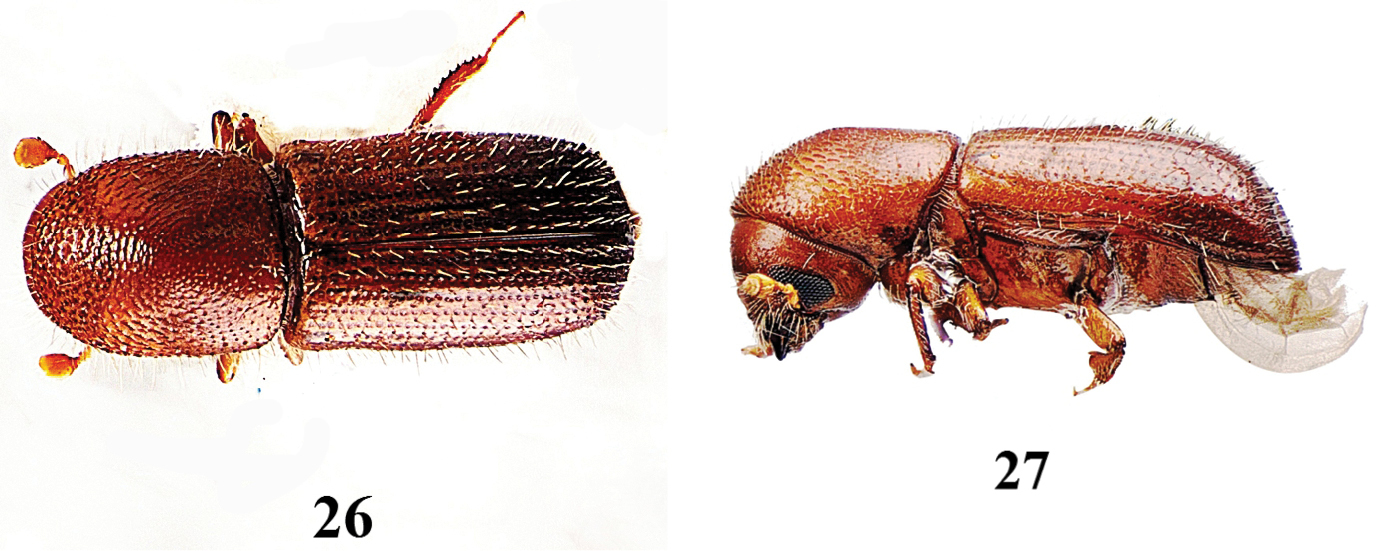

Scientific classification
- Domain: Eukaryota
- Kingdom: Animalia
- Phylum: Arthropoda
- Class: Insecta
- Order: Coleoptera
- Suborder: Polyphaga
- Infraorder: Cucujiformia
- Family: Curculionidae
- Genus: Xyleborus
- Species: X. xylographus

Binomial name
- Xyleborus xylographus (Say, 1826)

= Xyleborus xylographus =

Species of beetle

Xyleborus xylographus is a species of typical bark beetle in the family Curculionidae.
