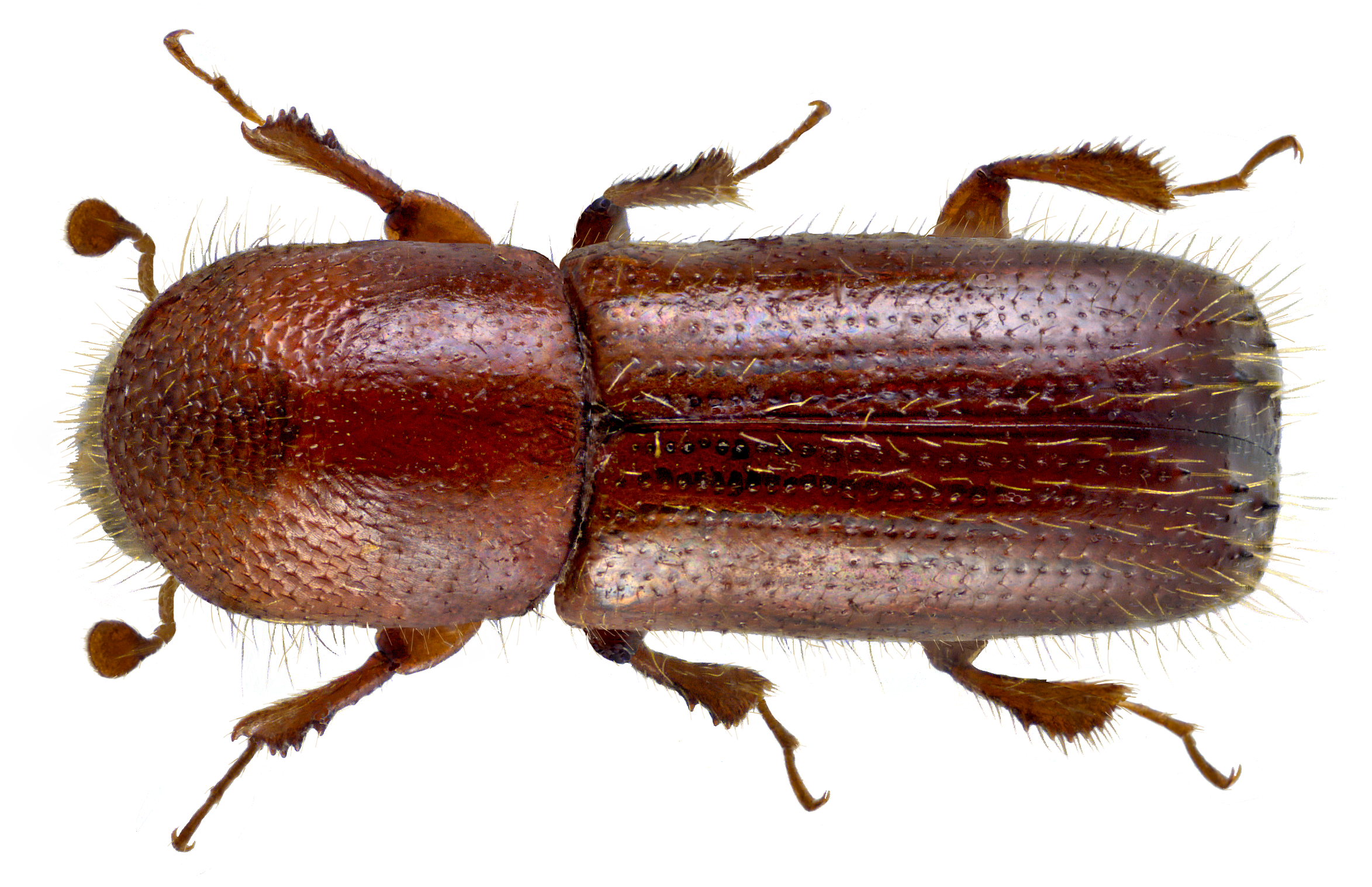
- Xyleborus monographus female

Scientific classification
- Kingdom: Animalia
- Phylum: Arthropoda
- Clade: Pancrustacea
- Class: Insecta
- Order: Coleoptera
- Suborder: Polyphaga
- Infraorder: Cucujiformia
- Superfamily: Curculionoidea
- Family: Curculionidae
- Genus: Xyleborus
- Species: X. monographus

Binomial name
- Xyleborus monographus Fabricius, 1792

= Xyleborus monographus =

Species of beetle

Xyleborus monographus, the Mediterranean oak borer, is a species of ambrosia beetle in the family Curculionidae. It is native to oaks in the regions around the Mediterranean Sea, but since 2019 has been found in California, where the oak trees it infests may be more vulnerable.

== Native habitat ==
The Mediterranean oak borer is around 1/8 inch (3.2 mm) long. It is native to the regions surrounding the Mediterranean. In these parts of Europe, the Middle East and North Africa the beetle mostly infests dead and dying oak trees. It is found in at least twelve species of oak. As with other ambrosia beetles, it carries symbiotic ambrosia fungi, which it cultivates for food along the boring tunnels. One of these fungi, Raffaelea montetyi, seems linked to wilt disease in cork trees (Quercus suber) in Portugal.

When the females fly to another tree they carry the fungal spores in their mycangia. The beetle penetrates through thin or cracked bark in the canopy branches. It first invades and kill branches in the canopy of a tree, then spreads to the trunk, culminating in the death of the tree. The females produce two or more generations annually. Large populations can develop in the lower trunk over a number of growing seasons. The fungi take nutrients from the xylem, which transports nutrients from the roots of the tree to its stems and leaves. Mechanical damage seems to cause the greatest amount of damage, since the extensive tunnels weaken the tree limbs, which may break.

== California invasion ==
The Mediterranean oak borer probably reached California around 2015. It was found in 2019 in Napa County, infesting oak trees near Calistoga. Since then it has been found in Lake County, Sonoma County and suburbs of Sacramento. It is not clear whether healthy trees are vulnerable, since the valley oak (Quercus lobata) and blue oak (Quercus douglasii) trees that were infested by Mediterranean Oak Borers were already under stress from other factors. As of August 2020 the California Department of Food and Agriculture was cooperating with county, state and federal organizations to survey the patterns of infestation and investigate approaches to managing the beetle.

== Sources ==
- Jones, Michael I (17 December 2020), New Invasive Insect: Mediterranean Oak Borer, Agriculture and Natural Resources, University of California
- Lyle, Steve (4 August 2020), Mediterranean Oak Borer detected in Lake, Napa, and Sonoma counties, Sacramento: CFDA
- Mobilian, Julianne (4 August 2020), "Mediterranean oak borer detected in several California counties", Norsery Management
- Robertson, Barbara (22 January 2021), "Tiny but dangerous new pest threatens oak trees", Marin Independent Journal
