= Xyleborus perforans =

Scientific classification
- Kingdom: Animalia
- Phylum: Arthropoda
- Clade: Pancrustacea
- Class: Insecta
- Order: Coleoptera
- Suborder: Polyphaga
- Infraorder: Cucujiformia
- Superfamily: Curculionoidea
- Family: Curculionidae
- Genus: Xyleborus
- Species: X. perforans

Binomial name
- Xyleborus perforans (Wollaston, 1857)

Synonyms
- Tomicus perforans Wollaston, 1857; Bostrichus testaceus Walker, 1859; Xyleborus duponti Montrouzier, 1861; Anodius tuberculatus Motschulsky, 1863; Anodius denticulus Motschulsky, 1863; Xyleborus kraatzii Eichhoff, 1868; Xyleborus kraatzii philippinensis Eichhoff, 1878; Xyleborus immaturus Blackburn, 1885; Xylopertha hirsuta Lea, 1894; Xyleborus whitteni Beeson, 1935; Xyleborus apertus Schedl, 1939; Xyleborus criticus Schedl, 1950; Xyleborus shionomisakiensis Murayama, 1951; Xyleborus cylindrus Schedl, 1951; Xyleborus minimus Schedl, 1955

Species of beetle

Xyleborus perforans, commonly known as island pinhole borer, is a species of weevil native in the Oriental region through to Australia but shows a cosmopolitan distribution due to introduction to many parts of the world.

== Distribution ==
The native range of the species includes: Bangladesh, Cambodia, China, Hong Kong, India, Andaman and Nicobar Islands, Indonesia (Java, Maluku Islands, Sulawesi, Sumatra), Laos, Malaysia, Myanmar, Nepal, Pakistan, Philippines, Singapore, Sri Lanka, Taiwan, Thailand, Vietnam, Papua New Guinea and Australia.

It is introduced to many African, European and American countries particularly through timber and wood commodities. This exotic range includes: Burundi, Cabo Verde, Cameroon, Comoros, Democratic Republic of the Congo, Republic of the Congo, Côte d'Ivoire, Gabon, Ghana. Kenya, Madagascar, Malawi, Mauritius, Nigeria, Réunion, Rwanda, São Tomé and Príncipe, Seychelles, Sierra Leone, Somalia, Tanzania, Uganda, Cocos Islands, Ryukyu Islands, Maldives, Portugal, Spain, Canada, British Columbia, United States, Hawaii, American Samoa, Christmas Island, Cook Islands, Micronesia, Fiji, French Polynesia, Guam, Kiribati, Marshall Islands, New Caledonia, Niue, Northern Mariana Islands, Palau, Samoa, Solomon Islands, Tonga, and Vanuatu.

== Description ==
Body length of the female ranges from 2.1 to 2.5 mm. Frons convex, and the entire surface is minutely reticulate with faint, shallow punctures. Pronotum sides are moderately arcuate whereas the anterior margin is broadly rounded, without serrations. Elytral apex is narrowly rounded. Elytral declivity is steep, and convex. There is a row of 4 to 5 small, acute granules found in elytral interspaces 1 and 3.

== Biology & control ==
A highly polyphagous species, it is known from diverse array of host plants. Due to being a secondary borer, it is considered as a high-risk quarantine pest. They show inbreeding, where the males usually mating with their sisters within the parental gallery system before dispersal. It is particularly common in disturbed areas and flies mainly around dusk, and can be attracted to light in large numbers easily. Adults normally attacks stressed or recently felled trees, newly sawn timber, fire-damaged trees, and salvaged logs. Sometimes, they attack living trees particularly through injuries or diseased areas. However, there is no any attack observed in small shoots and twigs.

The gallery system consists of branching tunnels, without enlargements, and penetrate deeply into the wood. During severe attacks, the tunnels ranges from different broods which are intersect withothers. These tunnels are usually in one transverse plane and rarely in vertical galleries. The surface galleries also have been observed at the cambial level. The first eggs brood appear when the tunnel length is from 3–8 cm. Then the emerging larvae develop and pupate within the same gallery system. Both parent female and the larvae feed on the ambrosia fungus such as Ambrosiella which are growing on the walls of the galleries. The fungus is transmitted by the female in a mycangium. Duration of the egg stage is about 4 days, and the larval stage is about 7 to 9 days. Pupal stage is 4 days, where the total duration from egg to teneral adult is about 16 to 18 days. The first females of the new generation extend the gallery system, and begin to lay eggs before the parental female has died. Therefore, overlapping generations is common within a single cane stem.

Adults can be controlled naturally by the parasite Phymastichus xylebori and other natural predators such as lizards, clerid beetles and ants as they attempt to bore into the host tree. Immature stages are susceptible for both predators and parasitoids.

=== Host plants ===
- Acacia mangium
- Agathis macrophylla
- Albizia zygia
- Anacardium occidentale
- Annona squamosa
- Araucaria cunninghamii
- Artocarpus heterophyllus
- Bauhinia variegata
- Bombax ceiba
- Boswellia serrata
- Carica papaya
- Cinnamomum verum
- Citrus
- Cocos nucifera
- Diospyros suaveolens
- Dryobalanops aromatica
- Eucalyptus
- Ficus
- Gonystylus bancanus
- Hevea brasiliensis
- Leucaena leucocephala
- Macadamia integrifolia
- Mangifera indica
- Parkia bicolor
- Persea americana
- Punica granatum
- Rhizophora mangle
- Rhizophora mucronata
- Saccharum officinarum
- Shorea robusta
- Theobroma cacao
- Toona ciliata
