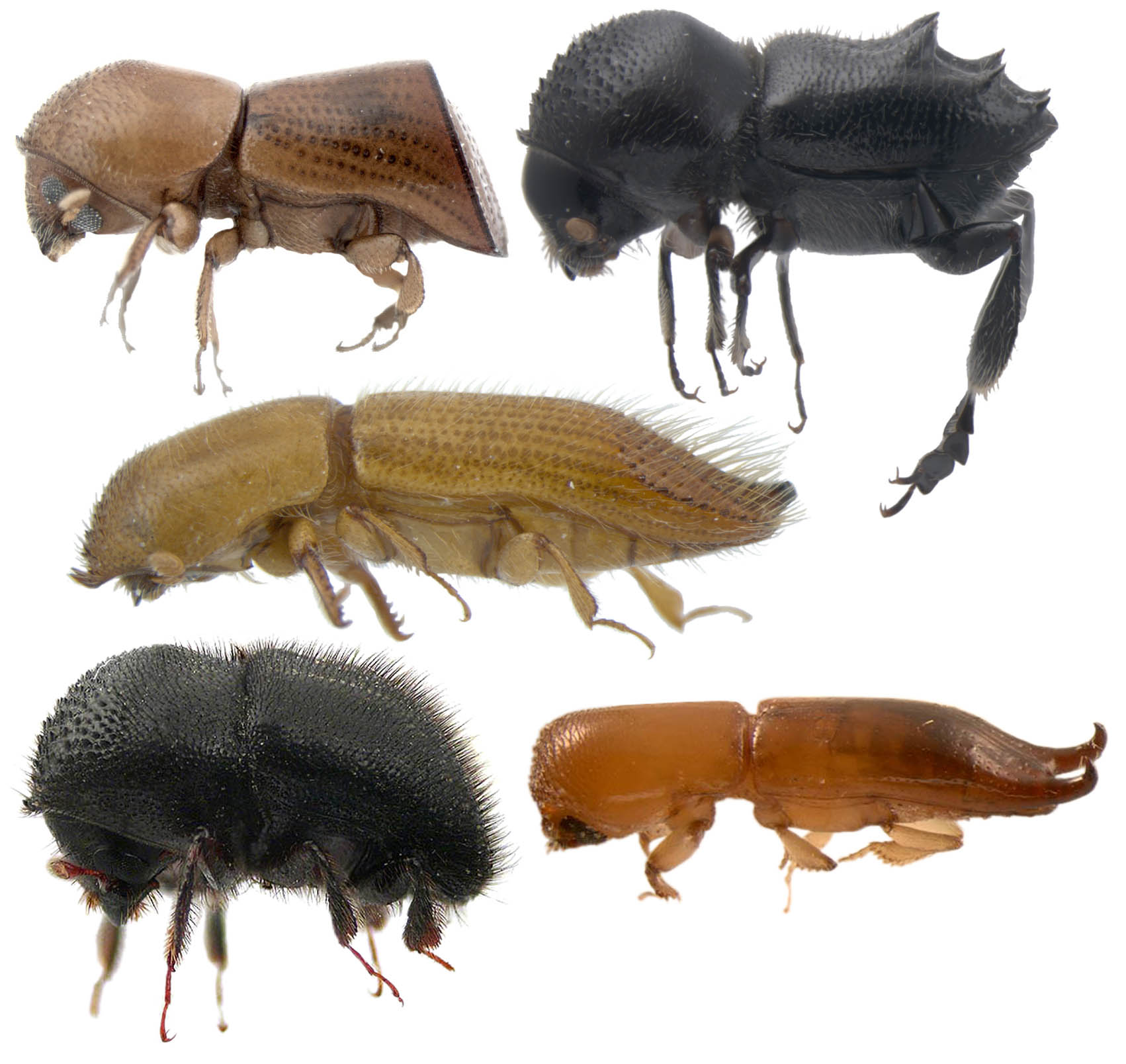
- Top left: Amasa resecta Top right: Eccoptopterus spinosus Center: Sampsonius sp. Bottom left: Xylosandrus ursa Bottom right: Coptoborus fragilis

Scientific classification
- Kingdom: Animalia
- Phylum: Arthropoda
- Clade: Pancrustacea
- Class: Insecta
- Order: Coleoptera
- Suborder: Polyphaga
- Infraorder: Cucujiformia
- Superfamily: Curculionoidea
- Family: Curculionidae
- Subfamily: Scolytinae
- Tribe: Xyleborini; LeConte, 1876

Genera
- Several, see text

= Xyleborini =

Tribe of beetles

Xyleborini are a tribe of ambrosia beetles (alternatively called subtribe Xyleborina of tribe Scolytini), highly specialized weevils of the subfamily Scolytinae. Much of the ambrosia beetle fauna in Eurasia and the Americas consists of Xyleborini species. Some Xyleborini are notorious invasive species.

Most genera are small or even monotypic, and contain 1-8 dozen species. The type genus Xyleborus contains over 500 species, but it is an unnatural grouping of species which are not closely related. Key for the world genera of Xyleborini available through a North Carolina State University website.

== Genera ==
Genera include:

- Amasa Lea 1893
- Ambrosiodmus Hopkins, 1915 (sometimes included in Xyleborus)
- Ambrosiophilus Hulcr & Cognato 2009
- Ancipitis
- Anisandrus Ferrari 1867
- Arixyleborus Hopkins 1915
- Beaverium Hulcr & Cognato 2009
- Cnestus Sampson 1911
- Coptoborus Hopkins, 1915
- Coptodryas Hopkins 1915
- Cryptoxyleborus Schedl, 1937
- Cyclorhipidion Hagedorn, 1912 - includes Terminalinus
- Debus Hulcr & Cognato 2010
- Diuncus Hulcr & Cognato 2009
- Dryocoetoides Hopkins 1915
- Dryoxylon Bright & Rabaglia 1999
- Eccoptopterus Motschulsky 1863
- Eggersanthus
- Euwallacea Hopkins, 1915 - often included in Xyleborus
- Fortiborus Hulcr & Cognato, 2010
- Fraudatrix Cognato, Smith and Beaver, 2020
- Hadrodemius Wood 1980
- Immanus Hulcr and Cognato, 2013
- Leptoxyleborus Wood 1980
- Melanesicus
- Microperus Wood 1980
- Planiculus Hulcr & Cognato, 2010
- Pseudowebbia Browne 1962
- Sampsonius Eggers 1935
- Schedlia Browne 1950
- Stictodex Hulcr & Cognato 2010
- Streptocranus Schedl 1939
- Taphrodasus Wood 1980
- Taurodemus Wood 1980
- Terminalinus
- Theoborus Hopkins 1915
- Tricosa Cognato, Smith & Beaver, 2020
- Truncaudum Hulcr & Cognato, 2010
- Wallacellus
- Webbia Hopkins 1915
- Xyleborinus Reitter, 1913
- Xyleborus (possibly paraphyletic with Cyclorhipidion)
- Xylosandrus Reitter, 1913

== Footnotes ==
- Genus list from Michigan State University (MSU) (2004): PEET Xyleborini - Genus list. Retrieved 2008-JUL-08.
