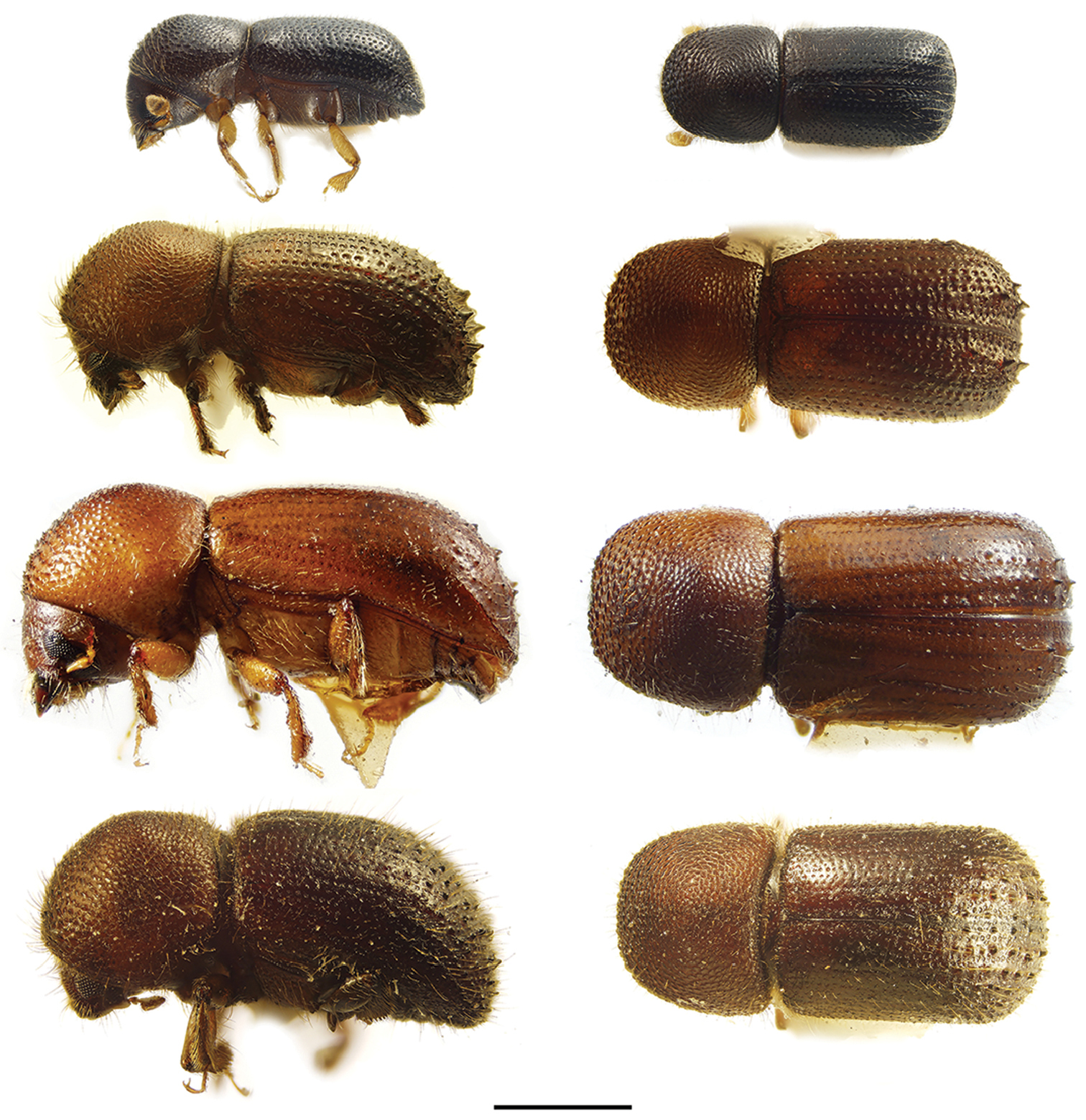
- Lateral and dorsal views of Ambrosiodmus species. Ambrosiodmus lecontei is shown in the second row from the top. The others species are A. devexulus, A. lewisi, and A. minor. Scale bar: 1.0 mm.

Scientific classification
- Domain: Eukaryota
- Kingdom: Animalia
- Phylum: Arthropoda
- Class: Insecta
- Order: Coleoptera
- Suborder: Polyphaga
- Infraorder: Cucujiformia
- Family: Curculionidae
- Genus: Ambrosiodmus
- Species: A. lecontei

Binomial name
- Ambrosiodmus lecontei Hopkins, 1915

= Ambrosiodmus lecontei =

Species of bark beetle

Ambrosiodmus lecontei is a species of typical bark beetle in the family Curculionidae. It is found in North America.
