= Xyleborus volvulus =

Scientific classification
- Domain: Eukaryota
- Kingdom: Animalia
- Phylum: Arthropoda
- Class: Insecta
- Order: Coleoptera
- Suborder: Polyphaga
- Infraorder: Cucujiformia
- Family: Curculionidae
- Genus: Xyleborus
- Species: X. volvulus

Binomial name
- Xyleborus volvulus (Fabricius, 1775)

Species of beetle

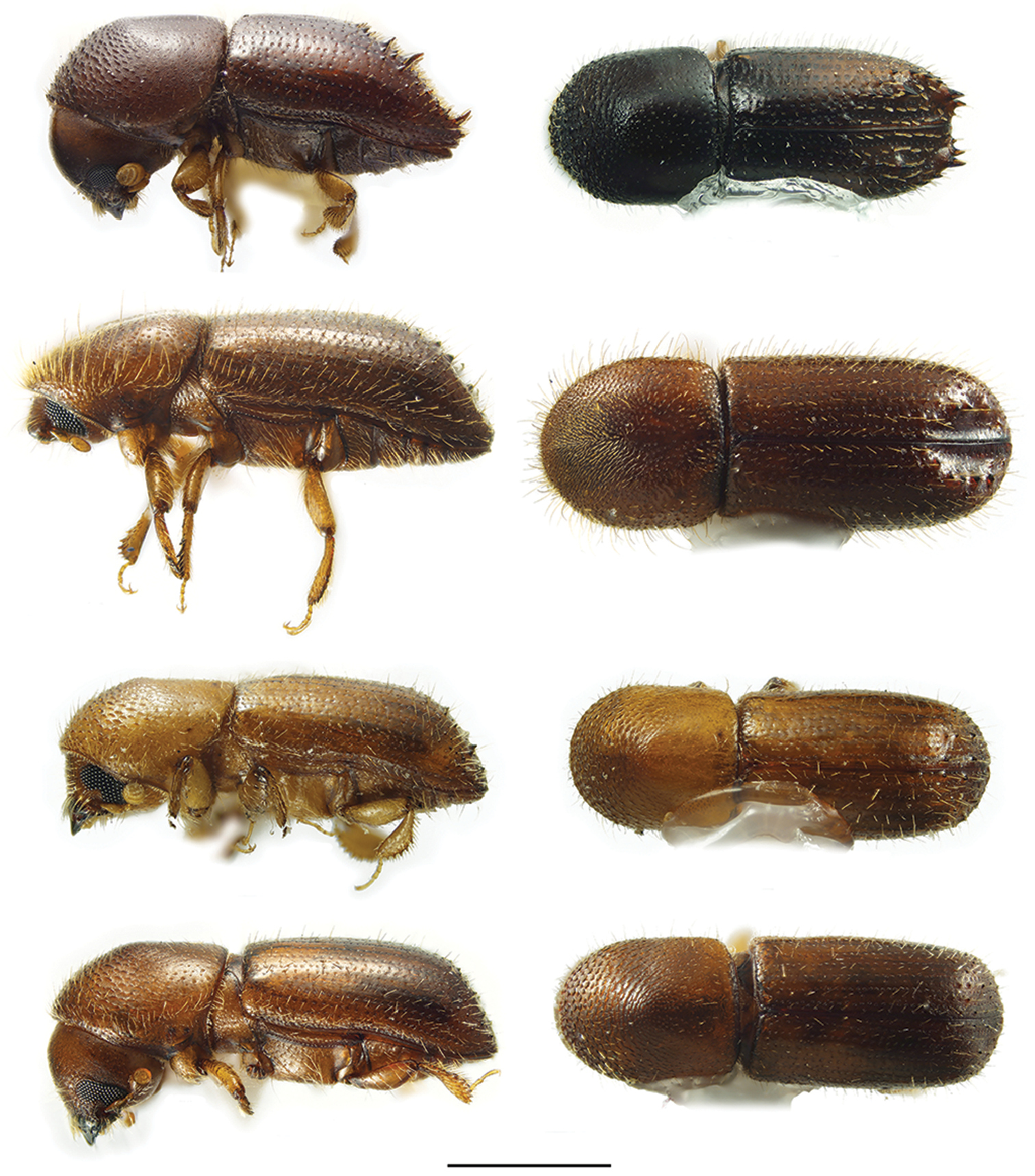
Specimen of X. volvulus (2nd row from bottom)

Xyleborus volvulus is a species of typical bark beetles in the family Curculionidae. It is found in North America.

Xyleborus volvulus beetles are found in all tropical and subtropical climates, mostly in Mexico. Their distribution is limited by cold (absent from higher elevations) and low humidity (absent from desert regions) conditions.
