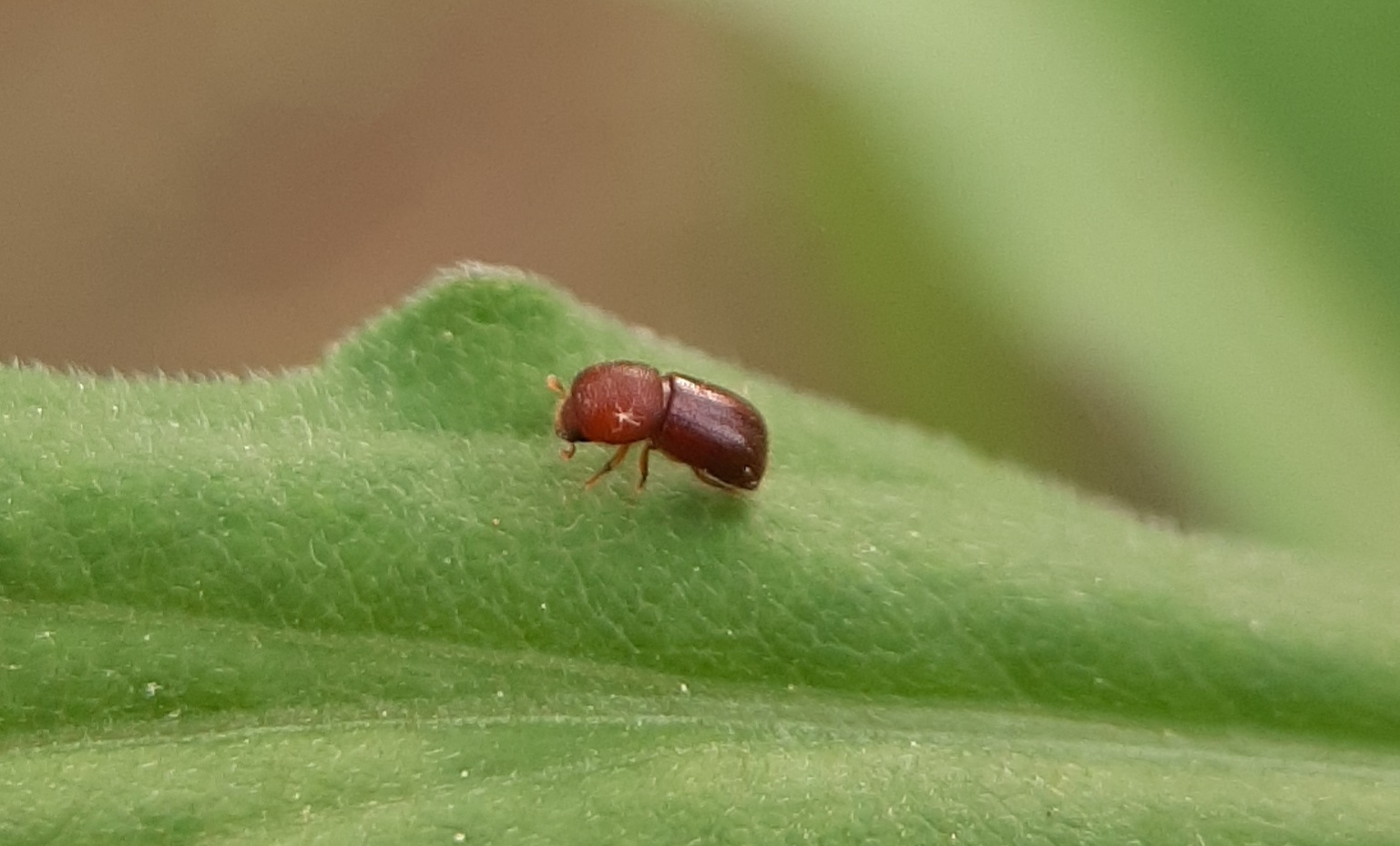

Scientific classification
- Domain: Eukaryota
- Kingdom: Animalia
- Phylum: Arthropoda
- Class: Insecta
- Order: Coleoptera
- Suborder: Polyphaga
- Infraorder: Cucujiformia
- Family: Curculionidae
- Genus: Ambrosiodmus
- Species: A. rubricollis

Binomial name
- Ambrosiodmus rubricollis (Eichhoff, 1875)

= Ambrosiodmus rubricollis =

Species of bark beetle

Ambrosiodmus rubricollis is a species of typical bark beetle in the family Curculionidae. It is found in North America and has been introduced to Italy.
