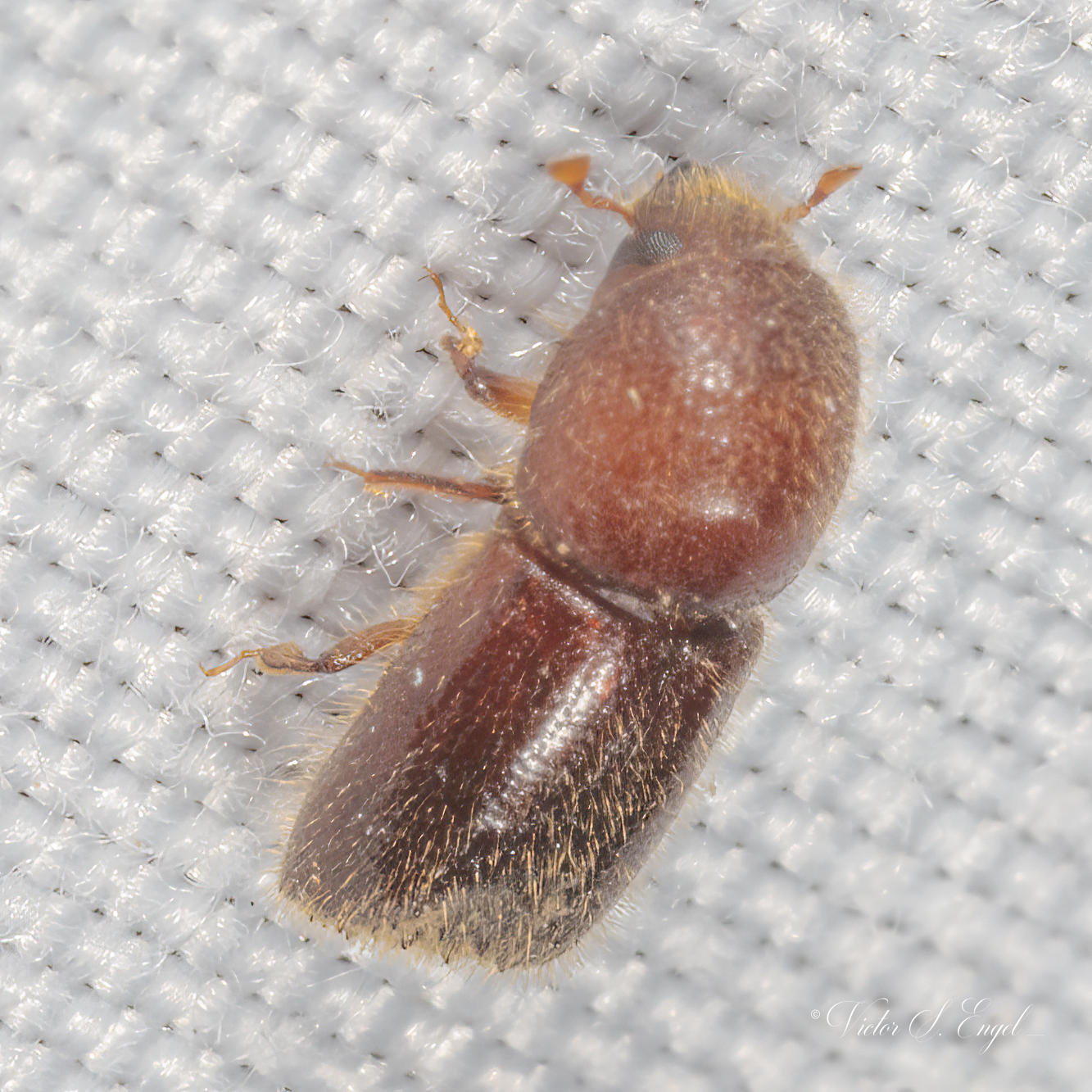

Scientific classification
- Kingdom: Animalia
- Phylum: Arthropoda
- Clade: Pancrustacea
- Class: Insecta
- Order: Coleoptera
- Suborder: Polyphaga
- Infraorder: Cucujiformia
- Family: Curculionidae
- Genus: Xyleborus
- Species: X. horridus

Binomial name
- Xyleborus horridus Eichhoff, 1869

= Xyleborus horridus =

Species of beetle

Xyleborus horridus is a species of typical bark beetle in the family Curculionidae. It is found in North America.
