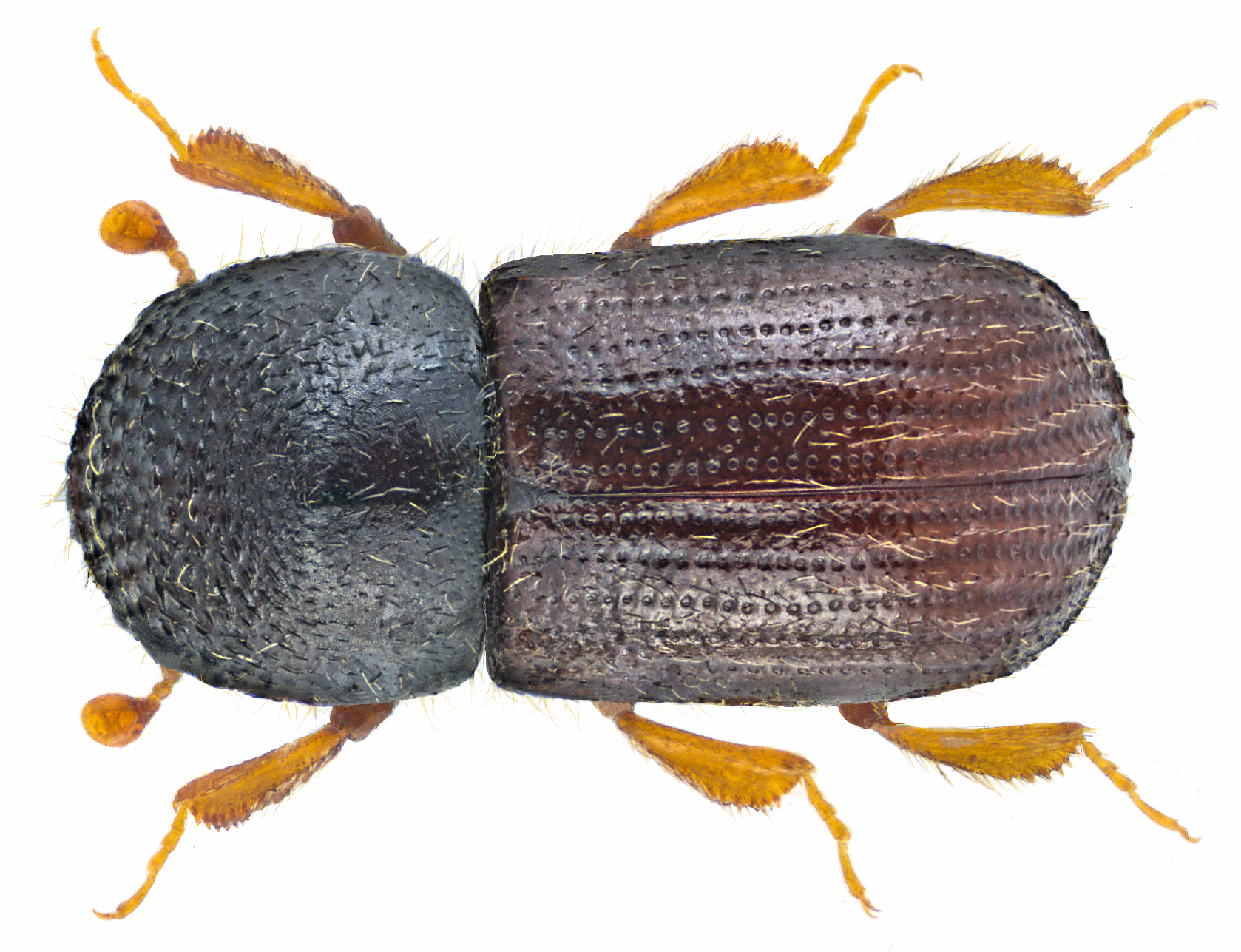

Scientific classification
- Kingdom: Animalia
- Phylum: Arthropoda
- Clade: Pancrustacea
- Class: Insecta
- Order: Coleoptera
- Suborder: Polyphaga
- Infraorder: Cucujiformia
- Superfamily: Curculionoidea
- Family: Curculionidae
- Genus: Xyleborus
- Species: X. dispar

Binomial name
- Xyleborus dispar (Fabricius), 1792

= Xyleborus dispar =

Species of beetle

Xyleborus dispar is a species of bark beetle commonly called the Pear blight beetle, or the European shothole borer. It is an invasive species in North America, and can be a pest in orchards and forests throughout its range.

== Taxonomy ==
Xyleborus dispar was first described by Fabricius in 1792 as Apate dispar. Current status was given in 1992 by Wood & Bright. North American beetles were once believed to be a separate species, but are now recognized as an invasive branch of the European species. It was named after the similarity of the beetle's effect on trees to the pear blight fungus.

== Identification ==
The body is wide and stout, and black-brown with a cylindrical shape. The legs and antennae are reduced to facilitate movement through tunnels. The female is 3.2-3.7 mm long, and is elongated and cylindrical compared with the smaller male (1.8-2.1 mm long). The females are about twice as long as wide. The elytra are dark in color with longitudinal streaks. The eggs are oval-shaped (1mm x 0.06mm) and white.

== Distribution ==
It is native to temperate and boreal regions of Europe and Asia. It has been introduced to North America prior to 1817, and is known to be present in the eastern United States from the Great Lakes states south to North Carolina, and the Pacific Northwest, suggesting that two separate introduction events occurred.

== Ecology and behavior ==
=== Life history ===
This beetle usually attacks compromised trees, however in its exotic range or when populations are especially high it has been known to infest healthy trees. The holes that the beetle makes in trees are small in diameter and circular. The holes in trees have a short (1–3 cm) entrance hole leading to a series of transverse tunnels containing eggs and larvae. Each female lays about 50 eggs, and once pupation is complete, the beetles stay in the galleries until the following spring.

The adult is known to overwinter in the holes they have created, and true hibernation occurs. One generation per year is produced. In early spring the female exits the hole and disperses, the male is smaller and wingless and stays in their natal tree. Once a female discovers a suitable tree, she sends out an aggregation hormone that attracts many other beetles, so a tree may have a large infestation, but usually not more than 40 beetles. Beetles may be found into June; the peak of activity is March and early April.

The beetle is strongly polyphagous, and has been known to infest many types of trees over its wide host range. These include Acer, Aesculus, Alnus, Betula, Castanea, Celtis, Crataegus, Corylus, Cydonia, Fagus, Fraxinus, Juglans, Liriodendron, Magnolia, Malus, Platanus, Populus, Prunus, Punica, Pyrus, Quercus, Salix, Styrax, Tilia, Ulmus, and Vitis. This beetle could be able to infect such a wide variety of trees because of its association with fungi potentially overcoming some of the plant's natural defenses. In the field of forest ecology, ambrosia beetles such as Xyleborus dispar that attack dead or dying plant matter are important for the decay process and leads to nutrient cycling.

Xyleborus dispar is the only species in the tribe Scolytidae to exhibit a true diapause.

=== Relationship with Fungi ===
Xyleborus dispar forms a symbiotic relationship with the fungus Ambrosiella hartigii. Adults introduce the fungi to their offspring, and it is stored in intersegmental pouches between pro- and mesonotum in the female. Larvae and adults then consume the fungus as it grows on the wood inside the galleries. The fungus often stains sapwood in the areas surrounding the larval galleries.

== Damage and control ==
This species is an invasive species in North America, and though it is already widely dispersed, it has the potential to invade new areas due to inbreeding among galleries enabling a small number of females to colonize new areas. The beetle is mostly an economic pest of fruit trees including apple, pear, apricot, and peach, but damage has also been reported from vineyards. It is a serious pest of Chestnut.

The species can be detected on damaged trees by the presence of sap flows, and sawdust on tree limbs or the ground indicating recent excavations. Drought, waterlogged soils, and temperature damage can make trees more susceptible to Xyleborus dispar infestations. Infested trees experience delayed growth.

Control

Xyleborus dispar, as well as other species of ambrosia beetles, are often attracted by the scent of alcohol traps, due to the fact that stressed trees produce ethanol as a byproduct of microbial growth in the dead woody tissues. Red winged sticky traps or window flight traps baited with ethanol can be an effective control of this species. Synthetic aggregation hormones may also be effective for controlling ambrosia beetles.

It is not known to have a large number of natural enemies, as larvae are typically well-protected in their galleries. No effective method of biological control exists at present, but bacteria found on the adult has been proposed as a means of treatment. Typically pesticides are ineffective due to the protected nature of the galleries, and very direct spraying is needed. Destroying branches on the trees that are affected may be necessary, and is effective at controlling outbreaks.
