= Ambrosiodmus tachygraphus =

Scientific classification
- Domain: Eukaryota
- Kingdom: Animalia
- Phylum: Arthropoda
- Class: Insecta
- Order: Coleoptera
- Suborder: Polyphaga
- Infraorder: Cucujiformia
- Family: Curculionidae
- Genus: Ambrosiodmus
- Species: A. tachygraphus

Binomial name
- Ambrosiodmus tachygraphus (Zimmermann, 1868)

Species of bark beetle

Ambrosiodmus tachygraphus is a species of typical bark beetle in the family Curculionidae. It is found in North America.
