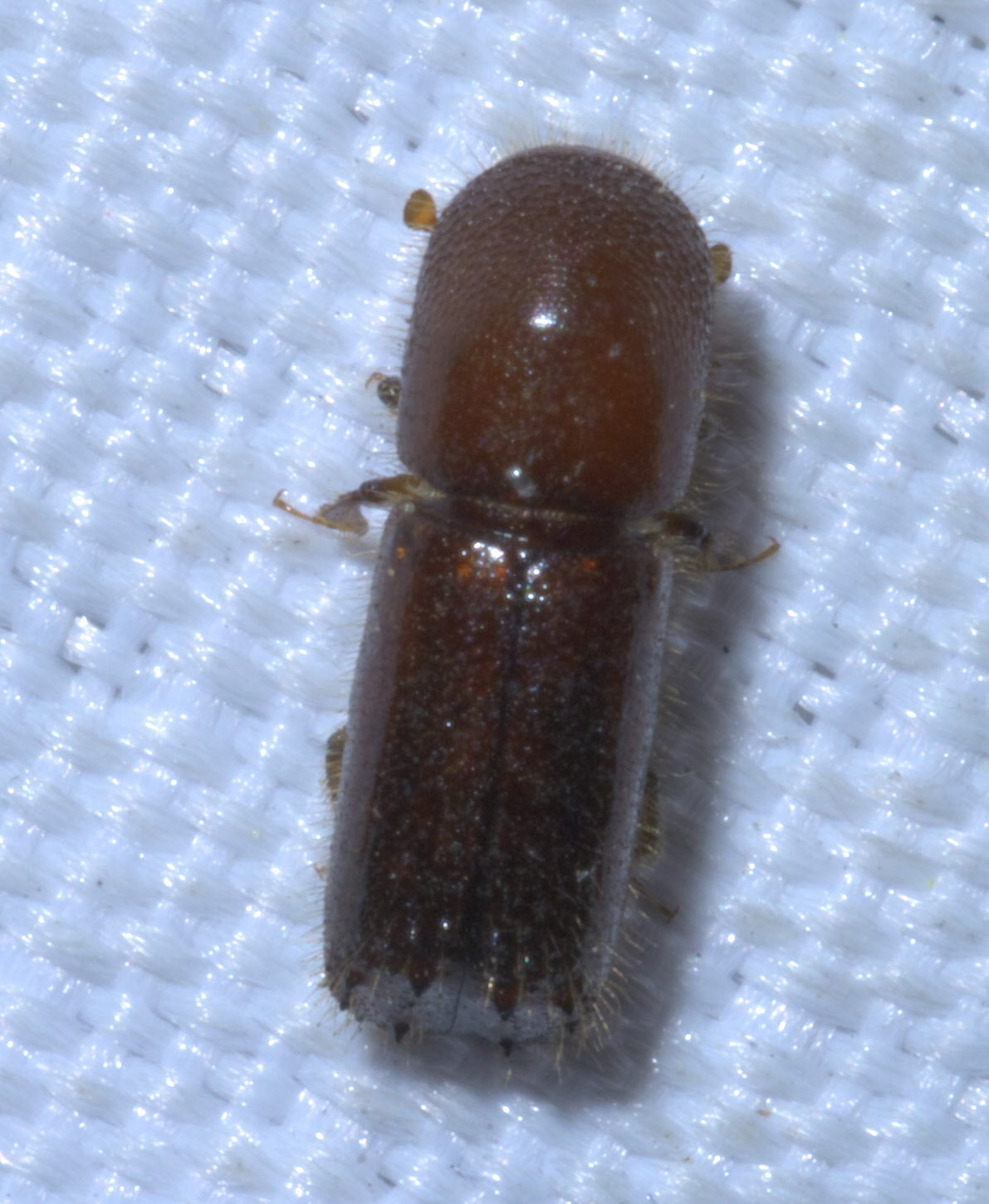

Scientific classification
- Kingdom: Animalia
- Phylum: Arthropoda
- Clade: Pancrustacea
- Class: Insecta
- Order: Coleoptera
- Suborder: Polyphaga
- Infraorder: Cucujiformia
- Family: Curculionidae
- Genus: Xyleborus
- Species: X. celsus

Binomial name
- Xyleborus celsus Eichhoff, 1868

= Xyleborus celsus =

Species of beetle

Xyleborus celsus is a species of typical bark beetle in the family Curculionidae. It is found in North America.

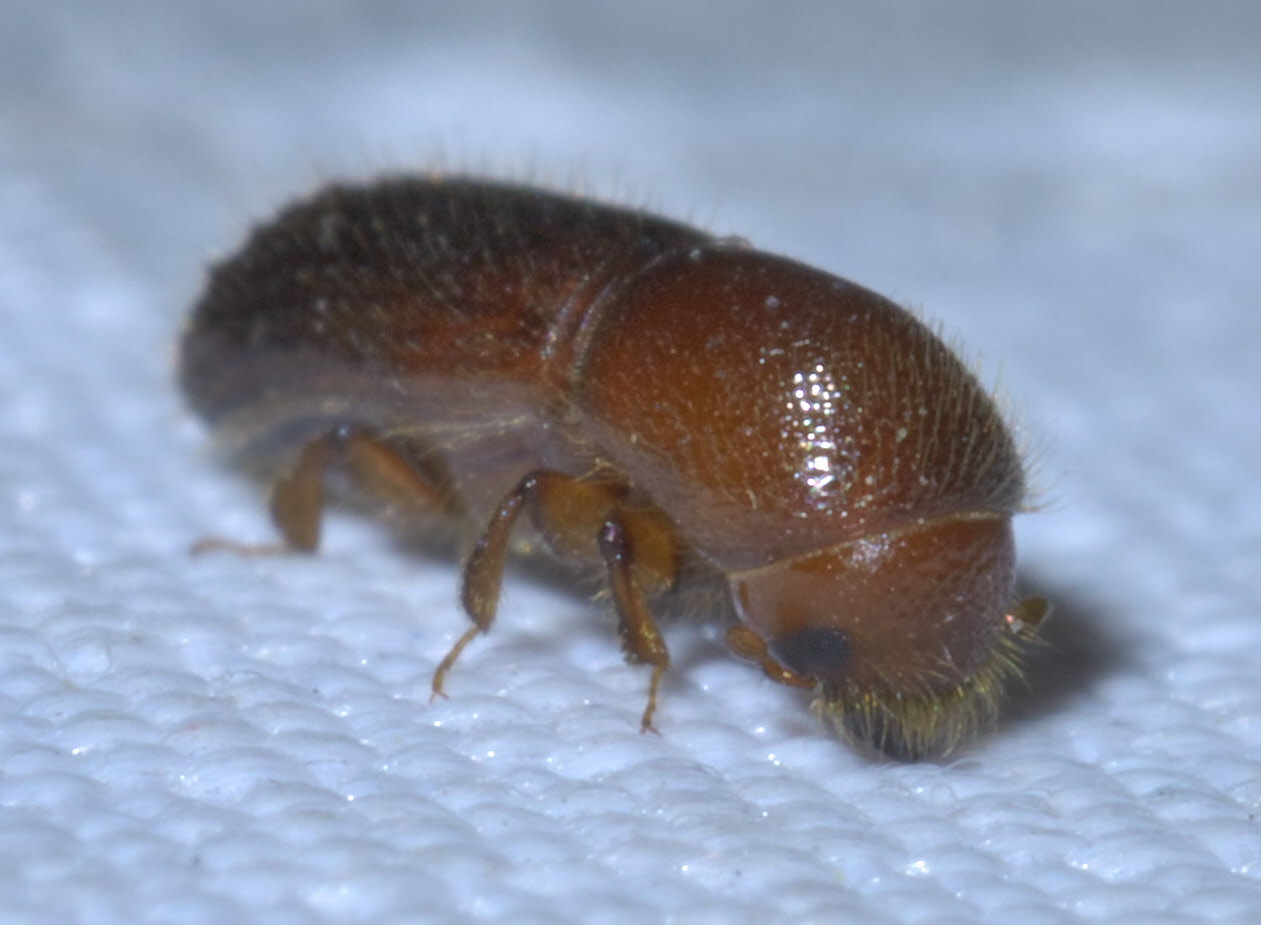
