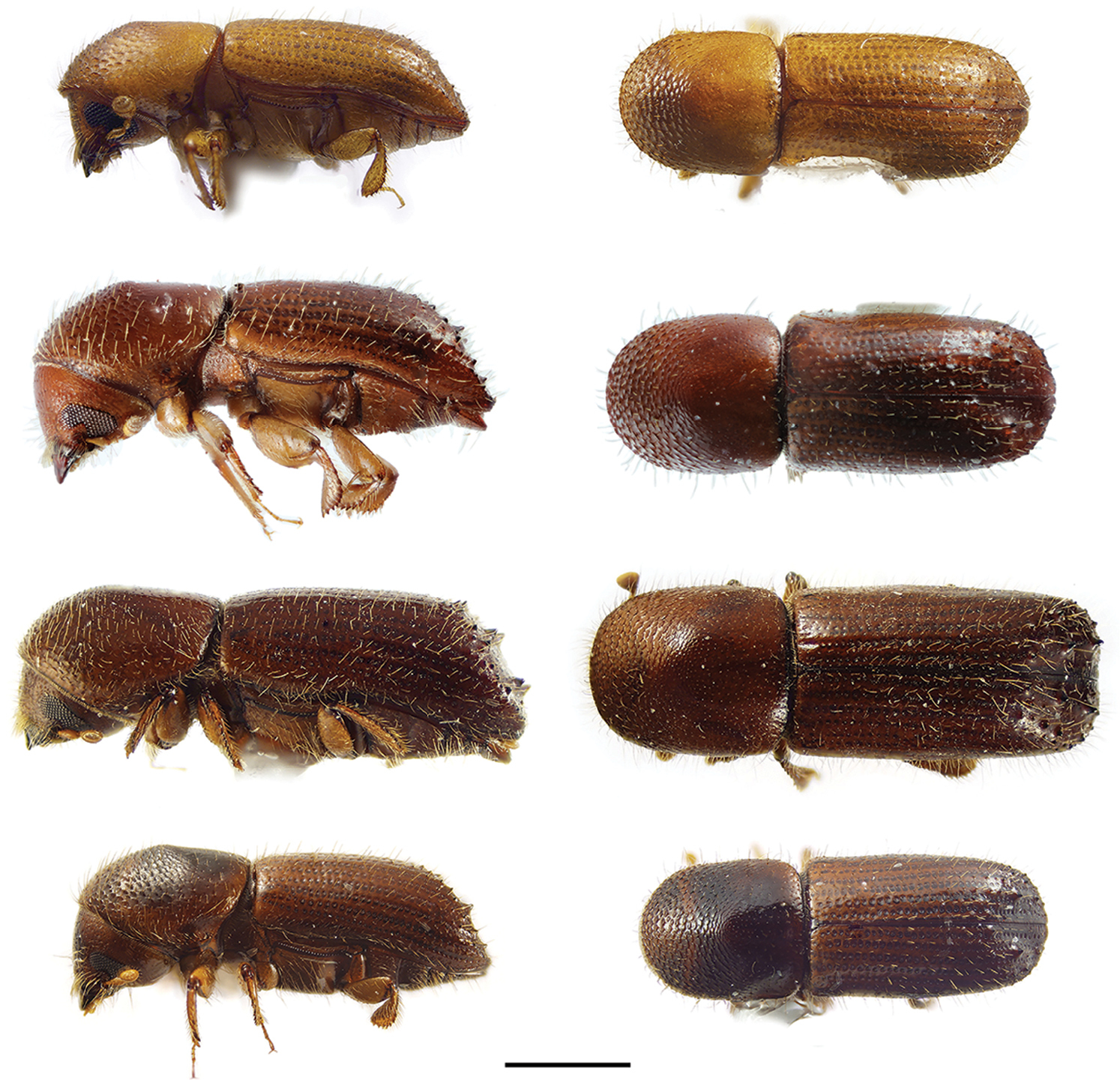

Scientific classification
- Kingdom: Animalia
- Phylum: Arthropoda
- Class: Insecta
- Order: Coleoptera
- Suborder: Polyphaga
- Infraorder: Cucujiformia
- Family: Curculionidae
- Genus: Xyleborus
- Species: X. ferrugineus

Binomial name
- Xyleborus ferrugineus (Fabricius, 1801)

= Xyleborus ferrugineus =

Species of beetle

Xyleborus ferrugineus is a species of typical bark beetle in the family Curculionidae. It is widely distributed across tropical and subtropical regions and is known for its symbiotic relationship with ambrosia fungi, which it cultivates and depends on for nutrition.

== Taxonomy ==
Xyleborus ferrugineus is one of the many species within the diverse genus Xyleborus, which belongs to the tribe Xyleborini in the subfamily Scolytinae, commonly known as ambrosia beetles.

- Kingdom: Animal
- Phylum: Arthropod
- Class: Insecta
- Order: Coleoptera
- Family: Curculionidae
- Subfamily: Scolytinae
- Genus: Xyleborus
- Species: Xyleborus ferrugineus

Authority: (Fabricius, 1801)

== Description ==
Adult beetles of Xyleborus ferrugineus are small, cylindrical, and reddish-brown in color. Like other members of the genus Xyleborus, they exhibit sexual dimorphism, with females being more numerous and responsible for gallery formation inside host trees.

== Ecology and Behavior ==
Xyleborus ferrugineus is an ambrosia beetle, meaning it does not feed directly on wood. Instead, females bore into host trees to create galleries where they cultivate symbiotic ambrosia fungi, which serve as the primary food source for both adults and larvae.

The species prefers weakened, stressed, or dead trees, although some infestations have been reported in apparently healthy hosts. Its preferred hosts include a variety of hardwood species, particularly in tropical forests.

== Economic Importance ==
Due to its association with wood products and its ability to infest a wide range of tree species, Xyleborus ferrugineus is considered a pest in the timber and forestry industry. Its presence in commercial wood can lead to structural damage and aesthetic defects, making lumber less valuable. Additionally, the fungi it introduces can cause staining and degradation of the wood.

== Synonyms ==
Throughout taxonomic history, this species has been referred to under various synonyms, as classification within Scolytinae has undergone several revisions.
