= Ambrosiodmus asperatus =

Scientific classification
- Kingdom: Animalia
- Phylum: Arthropoda
- Clade: Pancrustacea
- Class: Insecta
- Order: Coleoptera
- Suborder: Polyphaga
- Infraorder: Cucujiformia
- Family: Curculionidae
- Genus: Ambrosiodmus
- Species: A. asperatus

Binomial name
- Ambrosiodmus asperatus (Blandford, 1895)

Synonyms
- Xyleborus asperatus Blandford, 1895; Xyleborus nepotulus Eggers, 1923; Xyleborus citri Beeson, 1930; Xyleborus nepotulomorphus Eggers, 1936

Species of beetle

Ambrosiodmus asperatus, commonly known as ambrosia beetle, is a species of weevil found in China, India, Nepal, Indonesia: Java, Sumatra, Japan: Ryukyu Islands, Malaysia, Sri Lanka, Taiwan, and Brunei. The species also introduced to Australia.

== Description ==
This very small species has a body length is about 2.5 to 2.8 mm. The species is characterized by having declivital interstriae 2 bearing a row of 3 to 5 denticles. The declivital interstriae 1 are distinctly impressed.
