= Xyleborus pubescens =

Scientific classification
- Domain: Eukaryota
- Kingdom: Animalia
- Phylum: Arthropoda
- Class: Insecta
- Order: Coleoptera
- Suborder: Polyphaga
- Infraorder: Cucujiformia
- Family: Curculionidae
- Genus: Xyleborus
- Species: X. pubescens

Binomial name
- Xyleborus pubescens Zimmermann, 1868

Species of beetle

Xyleborus pubescens is a species of typical bark beetle in the family Curculionidae. It is found in North America.
