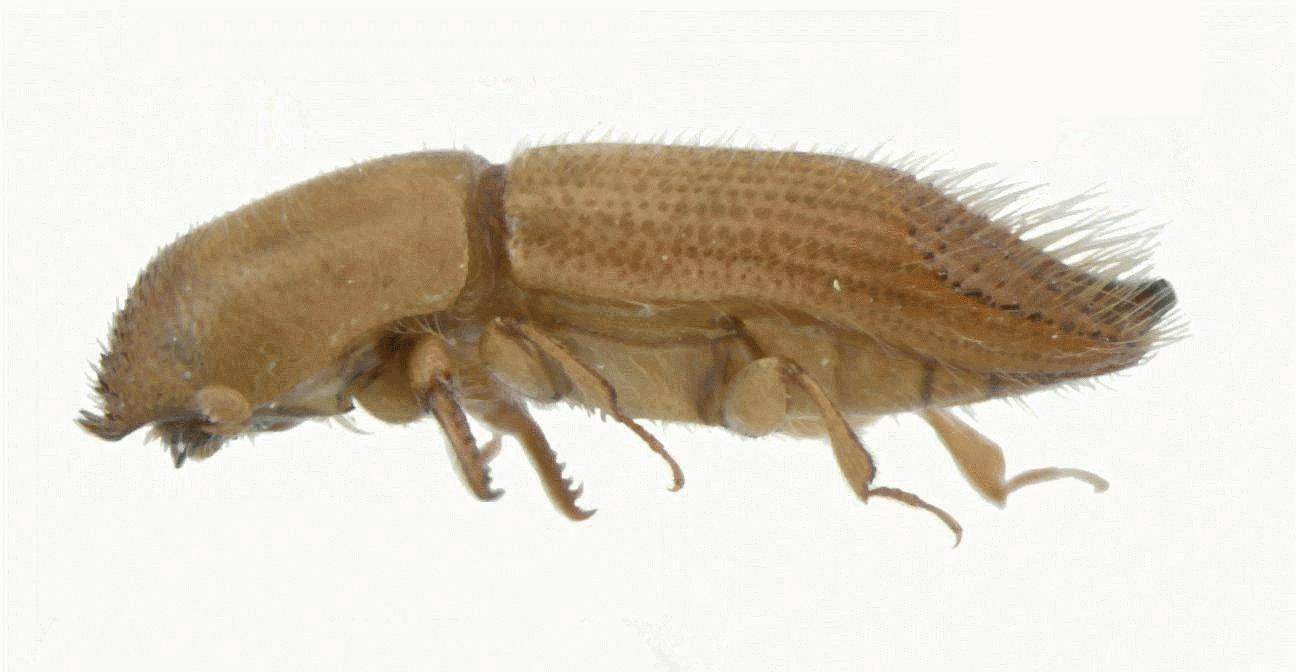

Scientific classification
- Kingdom: Animalia
- Phylum: Arthropoda
- Clade: Pancrustacea
- Class: Insecta
- Order: Coleoptera
- Suborder: Polyphaga
- Infraorder: Cucujiformia
- Superfamily: Curculionoidea
- Family: Curculionidae
- Genus: Sampsonius; Eggers, 1933

= Sampsonius =

Genus of beetles

Sampsonius is a genus of beetles belonging to the family Curculionidae.

The species of this genus are found in South America.

== Species ==
Species:

- Sampsonius alvarengai Bright, 1991c
- Sampsonius buculus Schedl, 1937h
- Sampsonius conifer Wood & Bright, 1992
- Sampsonius costaricensis Nunberg 1963
- Sampsonius dampfi Schedl 1940
- Sampsonius ensifer Wood 2007
- Sampsonius giganteus Schoenherr & J. 1994
- Sampsonius kuazi Petrov & Mandelshtam 2009
- Sampsonius lapidosus Petrov & Flechtmann, 2013
- Sampsonius lepusculusPetrov & Flechtmann, 2013
- Sampsonius mexicanus Bright 1991
- Sampsonius militaris Petrov & Flechtmann, 2013
- Sampsonius obtusicornis Schedl 1976
- Sampsonius pedrosai Schönherr, 1994
- Sampsonius pennatus Schedl 1973
- Sampsonius prolongatus Schönherr, 1994
