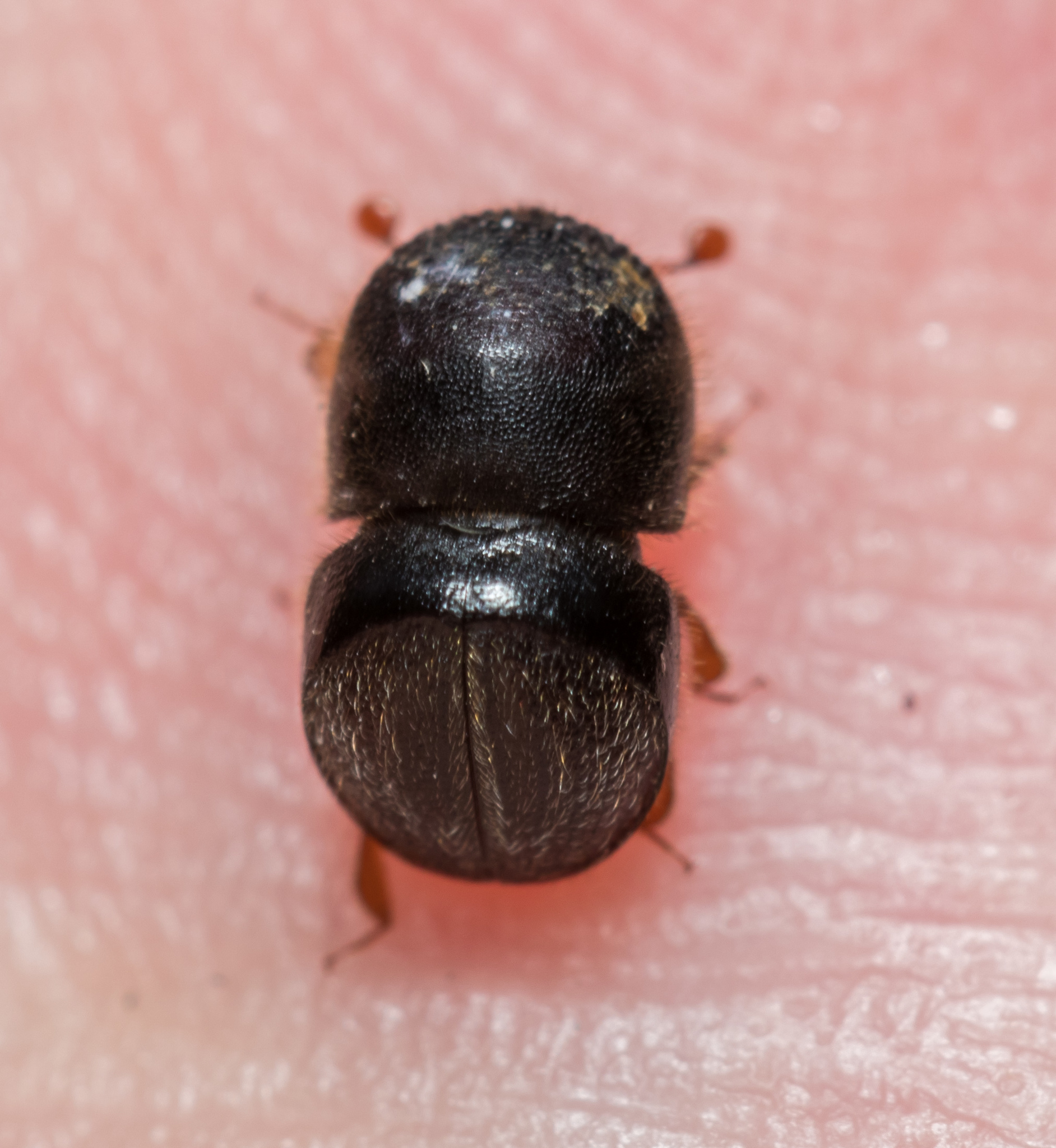
- female Cnestus sp. from Hong Kong

Scientific classification
- Domain: Eukaryota
- Kingdom: Animalia
- Phylum: Arthropoda
- Class: Insecta
- Order: Coleoptera
- Suborder: Polyphaga
- Infraorder: Cucujiformia
- Family: Curculionidae
- Subfamily: Scolytinae
- Tribe: Xyleborini
- Genus: Cnestus; Sampson, 1911

= Cnestus =

Genus of beetles

Cnestus is a genus of ambrosia beetles.

One prominent species is Cnestus mutilatus, the camphor shot borer. It is an invasive species that originated in Asia, and has spread over much of the Eastern United States.

== Description ==
Beetles of this genus are commonly around 3–4 mm in body length.

== Etymology ==
The original author did not give any indication on the etymology of the genus name.

== Taxonomy ==
Around twenty species have been described for this genus.
