= Walter F. H. Blandford =

British entomologist

- Born: 28 December 1864; London
- Died: 23 January 1952 (aged 87); London

Walter Fielding Holloway Blandford (1864–1952) was a British entomologist. He attended Cambridge University, where he took first class in the Natural History Tripos. He served as a Secretary and officer for the Royal Entomological Society of London. His contributions included extensive studies of the beetle family Scolytidae (now classified as a subfamily, Scolytinae), including formal descriptions of many newly-discovered species from around the world.
