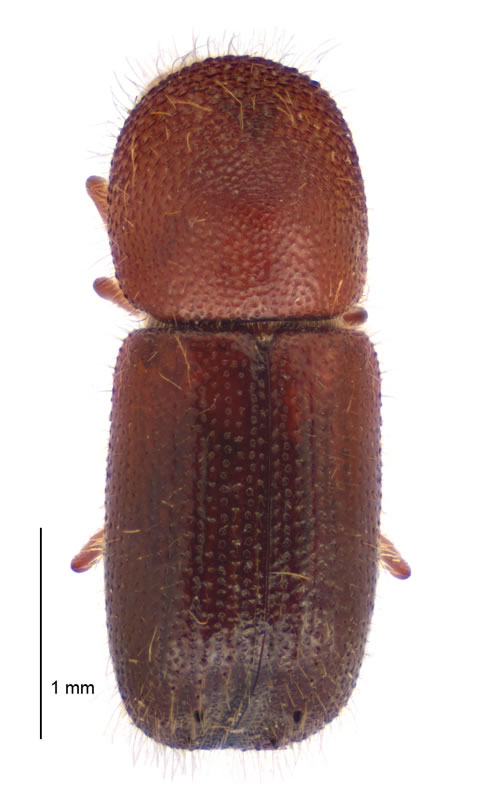
- Ambrosiodmus compressus

Scientific classification
- Kingdom: Animalia
- Phylum: Arthropoda
- Class: Insecta
- Order: Coleoptera
- Suborder: Polyphaga
- Infraorder: Cucujiformia
- Family: Curculionidae
- Subfamily: Scolytinae
- Tribe: Scolytini
- Subtribe: Xyleborina
- Genus: Ambrosiodmus; Hopkins, 1915

Diversity
- At least 100 species

= Ambrosiodmus =

Genus of beetles

Ambrosiodmus is a genus of typical bark beetles in the family Curculionidae. There are at least 100 described species in Ambrosiodmus.

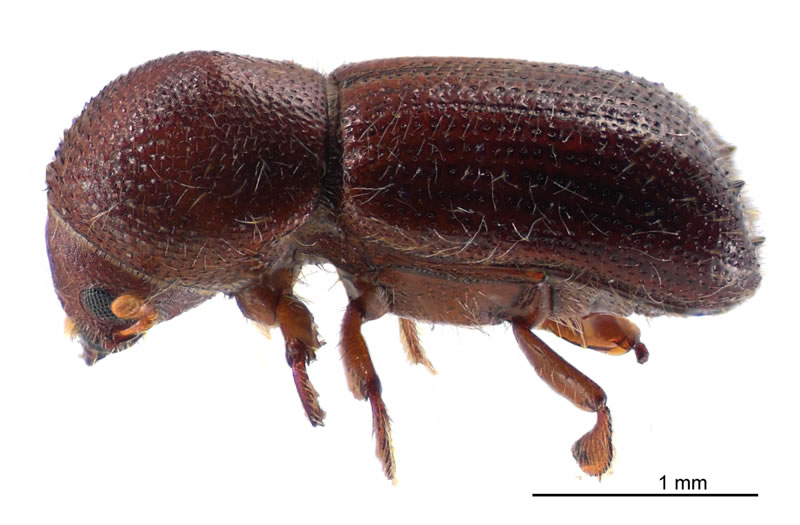
Ambrosiodmus compressus

== See also ==
- List of Ambrosiodmus species
