= Ambrosiella roeperi =

Scientific classification
- Kingdom: Fungi
- Division: Ascomycota
- Class: Sordariomycetes
- Order: Microascales
- Family: Ceratocystidaceae
- Genus: Ambrosiella
- Species: A. roeperi

Binomial name
- Ambrosiella roeperi T.C. Harr. & McNew (2014)

Ambrosia fungus of granulate ambrosia beetle

Ambrosiella roeperi is the fungal symbiont of the granulate ambrosia beetle, Xylosandrus crassiusculus, facilitating this insect's capacity to accumulate on and damage a diverse array of woody plants from around the world. It is one of several important nutritional partners derived from order Microascales that sustain and are transported by xylomycetophagous scolytine beetles.

== Taxonomy ==
Although unnamed Ambrosiella-like fungi had previously been documented from the galleries and mycangia of native X. crassiusculus populations in central Japan, A. roeperi was first described as a novel species of ambrosia fungus by Harrington and McNew in 2014 based on isolations from beetles collected and trapped in the eastern United States, where it is invasive. It has not been assigned a common name at the time of this writing. All Ambrosiella are ambrosia beetle symbionts and belong to the family Ceratocystidaceae, which, where sexual stages are recognized, produce round, ostiolate (with a pore) fruiting bodies for their ascospores with a fine peridium (outer layer) and aseptate (lacking crosswalls) paraphyses (sterile tissue found among – and arising from the same surface as – spore-bearing cells). This family also includes Ceratocystis, representing several plant pathogens and sap-staining fungi, often transported by insects (including scolytine beetles); Chalaropsis, encompassing a few economically insignificant root diseases; Huntiella, primarily made up of saprobes associated with lesions on trees, transported by sap beetles and in one case an Ips bark beetle; Thielaviopsis, containing various agents of disease affecting monocots; Davidsoniella, comprising several species of tree pathogens, and Endoconidiophora, growing on conifers, producing disease and/or sap stain, and also often acting as a bark beetle associate. The closest relatives within the genus are Ambrosiella xylebori, the symbiont of Xylosandrus compactus (the black twig borer), and Ambrosiella grosmanniae, the symbiont of Xylosandrus germanus (the black stem borer).

The genera of Ceratocystidaceae have been revised multiple times based on molecular data, incorporating sequences derived from other Ambrosiella species but not necessarily A. roeperi (and sometimes only including Ambrosiella that have now been moved elsewhere). These analyses imply the genus is most closely related to Huntiella. Within this taxon, studies incorporating the LSU rDNA of A. roeperi suggest that it, A. xylebori, A. hartigii, and A. beaveri comprise a monophyletic lineage excluding A. ferruginea (now Phialoporopsis ferruginea) and most closely aligned to Ceratocystis adiposa, subsequent analysis using 18S rDNA and translation elongation factor alpha confirms this and suggests a monophyletic clade of Ambrosiella associated with the scolytine tribe Xyleborini.

== Morphology ==
When within a host tree, A. roeperi appears as a dark stain along the walls of X. crassiusculus galleries, not immediately distinguishable from many other ambrosia fungi. Culturing A. roeperi on malt yeast extract agar (MYEA) for approximately a week in darkness at 25 °C yields large colonies with translucent, filamentous edges, immediately preceded by a dark inner ring speckled with white powder, which grows increasingly dense moving towards the middle of the colony but tapers out towards the very center. There may also be droplets of orange exudate coming from the powdery region of growth; this fluid may darken as the culture ages. The bottom of the colony similarly becomes a much deeper brown as it matures, even in refrigerated cultures.

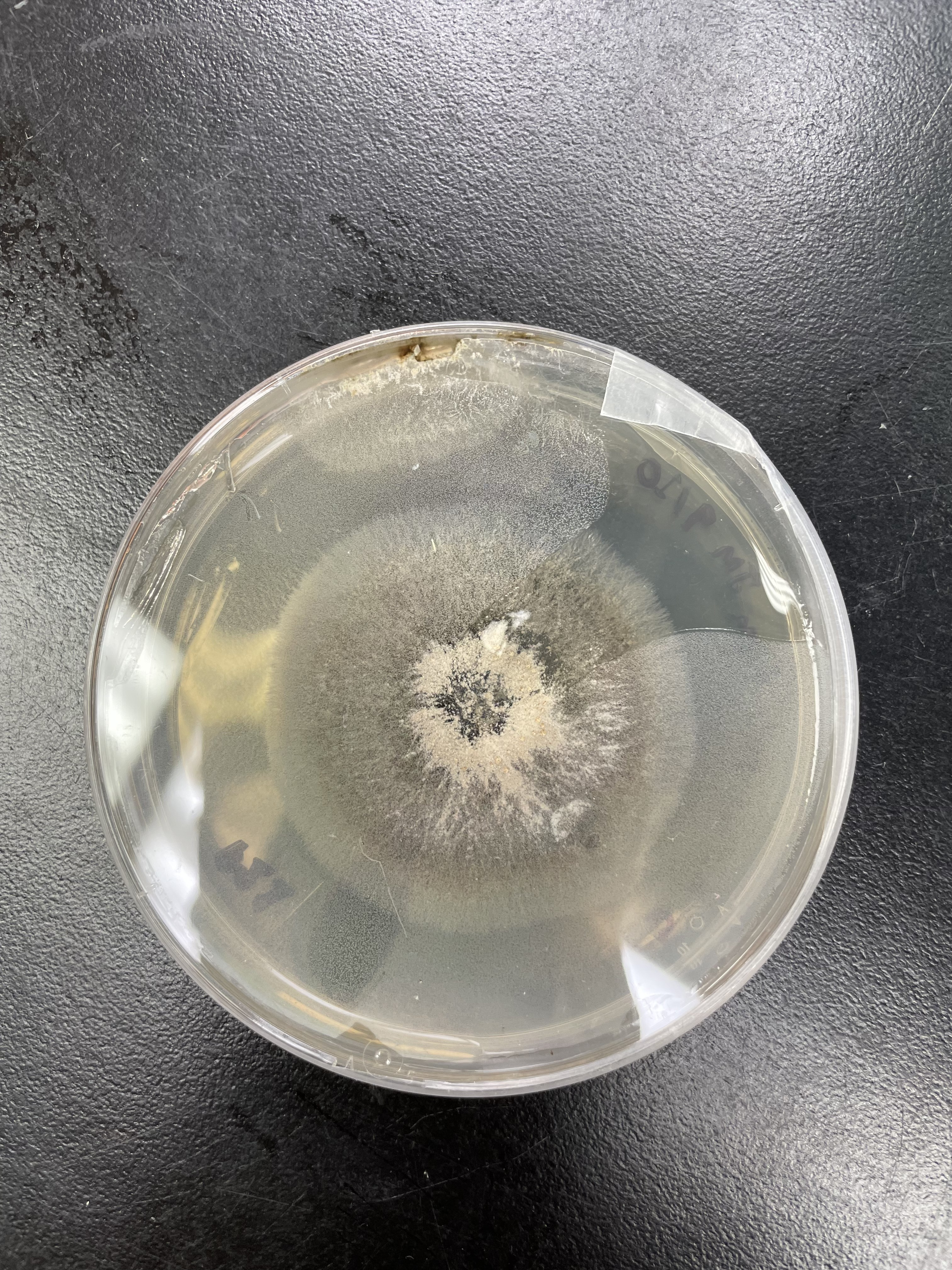
An image of a colony of A. roeperi growing on MYEA

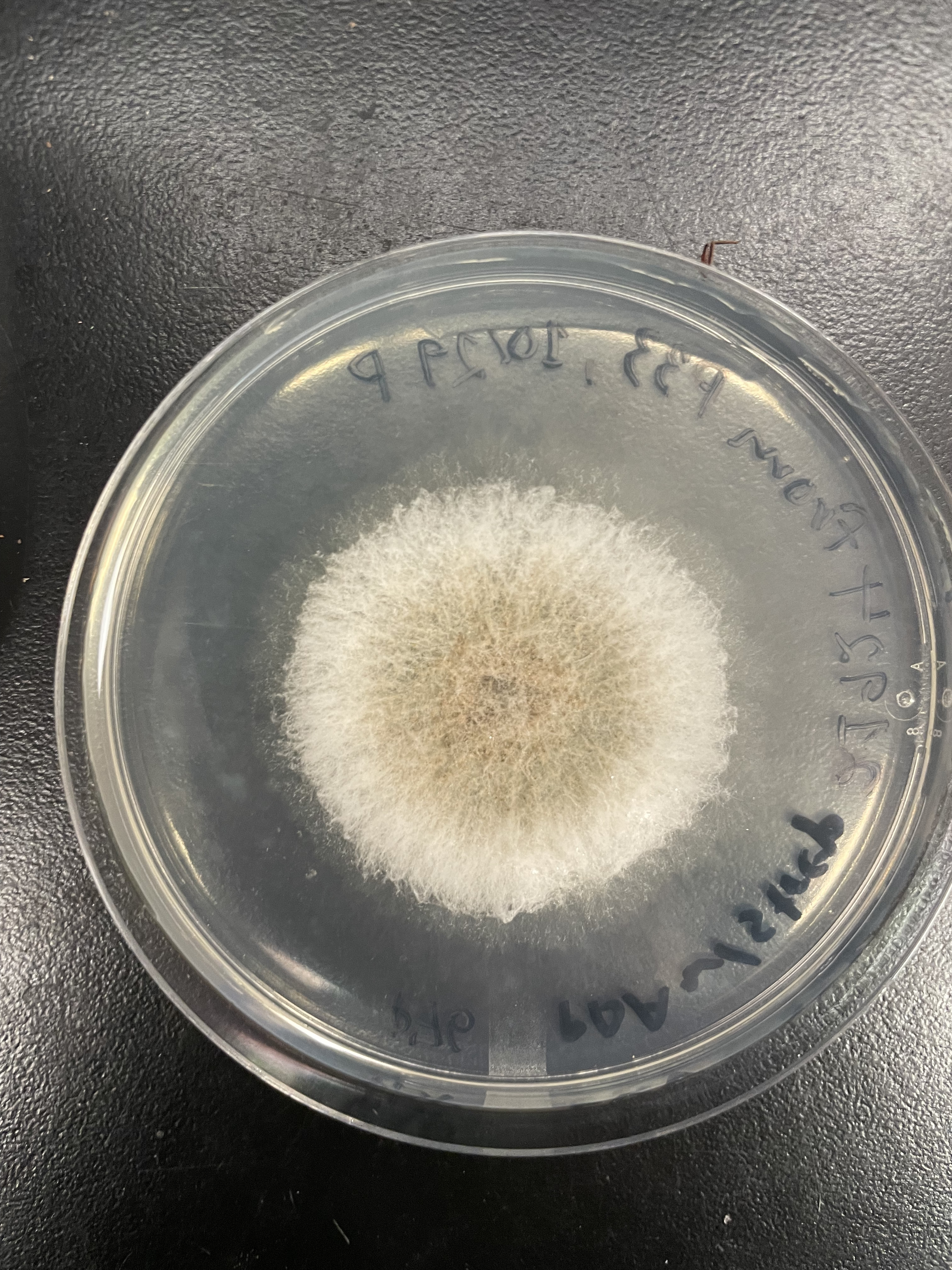
An image of a colony of A. roeperi with a slightly different morphology growing on MYEA

Only one Ambrosiella (A. cleistominuta from the xyleborine ambrosia beetle Anisandrus maiche) has ever been reported to produce sexual structures, and the rest (including A. roeperi) have been assumed to undergo exclusively clonal reproduction. All Ambrosiella produce translucent, flask-shaped conidiogenous cells (phialides) borne on non-fertile sporodochia (minute, dense cushions of nonreproductive hyphae holding up the fertile tissue). Conidia may arise from these phialides as chains – i.e., new spores are successively pushed out, with the newest growth closest to the original conidiogenous cell – or singly, as an aleurioconidium that ruptures the membrane of the mother cell and then remains a unique, differentiated terminal unit without any subsequent neighbors produced from the phialide. A. roeperi operates only through the latter mechanism, which is distinct from what is reported in A. beaveri, A. trypodendri, and A. hartigii (suggested to use the former, chain-like method).

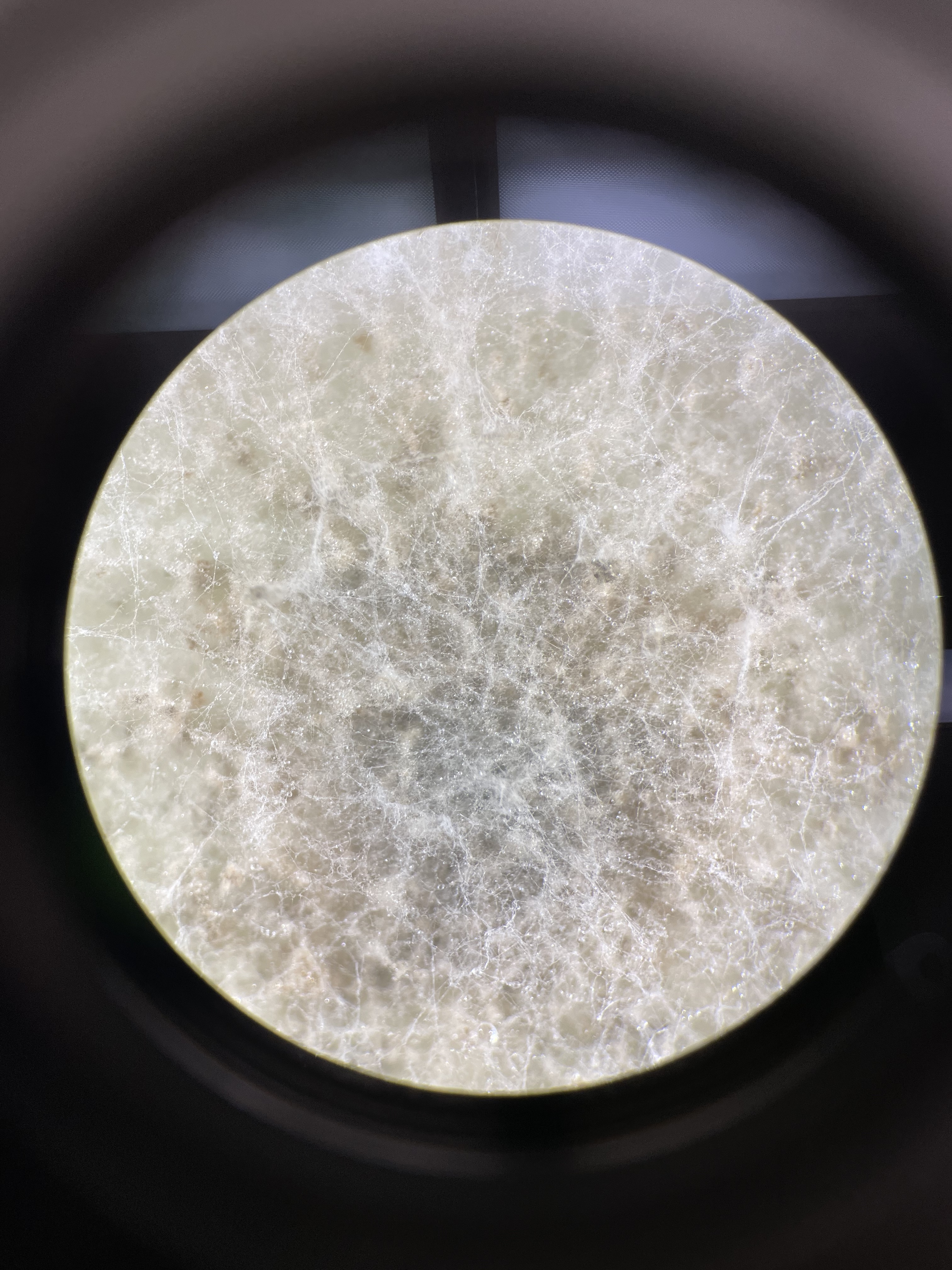
A. roeperi hyphae in culture on MYEA under a dissecting microscope

The conidia typically retain at least one adjacent spore-producing cell when broken away from the sporodochia, distinguishing A. roeperi conidiogenous structures from the less swollen, non-detachable conidiophores of A. xylebori; the original species description suggests this feature is meant to allow these units to snap off easily while X. crassiusculus is grazing upon the gallery. When within the beetle mycangium (a pocket in the insect cuticle for fungal dispersal), A. roeperi can be found as small, several-cell chains with crosswalls; this material is likely derived from chunks of mycelium scraped from the gallery walls and may thus constitute an arthrospore-like structure. Notably, this indicates that the conidia produced in the galleries are unlikely to act as the predominant dispersive forms of A. roeperi, and beetles instead transport fungi to new trees as disarticulated hyphae.

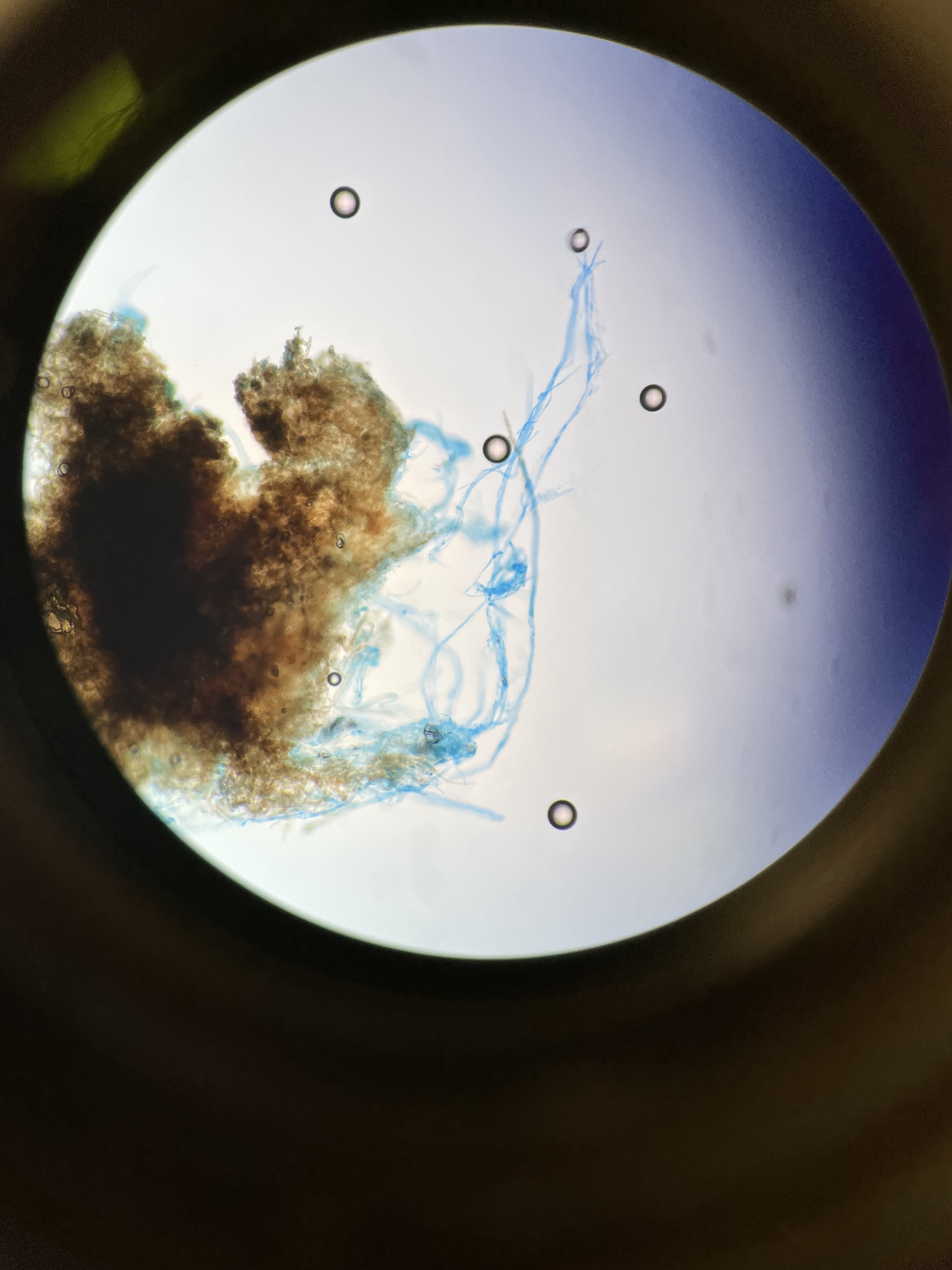
A. roeperi hyphae stained with lactophenol blue

== Ecology ==
In nature, A. roeperi is found primarily on the walls of ambrosia beetle galleries within a wide variety of host trees, where it survives by degrading compounds within wood. Traditionally, although they facilitate beetle growth and reproduction in nutritionally poor xylem tissue, ambrosia fungi are considered to be ineffective agents of wood decomposition, producing enzymes primarily dedicated to degradation of xylan, glucomannan, and callose (common components of hemicellulose) rather than cellulose, mirroring similar analyses made for various saprotrophic fungi. However, no equivalent studies have been performed on A. roeperi specifically, and it is worth noting that the article often cited in support of this conclusion only examined the fungal galleries of one beetle (Xyleborinus saxenii) associated with a different symbiont, Raffaelea sulfurea. Interestingly, metabolomic studies incorporating A. roeperi indicate that when growing on wood, this fungus possesses a lipid profile more similar to non-mutualistic Ceratocystidaceae than to other ambrosia fungi, further supporting the idea that making sweeping conclusions about fungal lifestyles based on data from apparently similar convergent systems can be misleading, as well as reinforcing how much remains to be learned about this and other ambrosial species.

There are various molecular indications that hint at other ways in which A. roeperi may interact with its woody hosts. The genus Ambrosiella shares at least two nonribosomal peptide synthesis gene clusters with the rest of Ceratocystidaceae encoding intracellular and extracellular siderophores. These products generally help chelate or bind iron for various cellular processes and can be major virulence factors in other fungi; however, seeing as Ambrosiella do not act as serious plant pathogens, the exact role of these peptide products in mediating their relationship with live or decaying tissue has yet to be determined. Unlike serious disease-causing fungi within the Ceratocystidaceae, Ambrosiella possess only half of the full complement of catechol dioxygenases common to this family. These enzymes are generally needed to help fungi metabolize certain plant chemical defenses, and the loss of these genes may reflect this genus's association with individuals that are already weakened or dead and thus less likely to be producing effective antifungal metabolites.

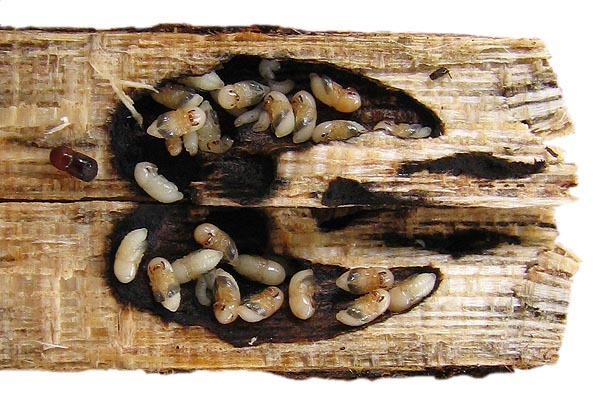
The beetle Xylosandrus crassiusculus within its gallery. Walls are stained with fungal growth.

Aside from its association with trees, A. roeperi shares its most significant ecological interactions with the granulate ambrosia beetle Xylosandrus crassiusculus. As in other ambrosia beetles, the fungus benefits from the opportunity for dispersal via the insect's mycangium, which in X. crassiusculus consists of a spacious mesonotal pouch. According to the current understanding of this symbiosis, when beetles emerge from pupae, their mycangia are inoculated with ambrosial fungi, and special gland cells flanking the mycangium begin to secrete compounds that promote their growth over that of assorted commensals. When the beetles colonize a new tree, the fungus growing in the cuticular pouch is introduced to the walls of the new gallery, glandular activity stops, and the mycangium ceases to act as a selective organ. The larvae and adults feed exclusively upon the conidia produced along the walls of the gallery, through which the beetles meet all of their nutritional requirements. (This feature differentiates ambrosia beetles from bark beetles, which typically feed on the phloem and, though they may eat and/or disperse some fungi, can generally survive on wood alone.) Structures possibly comprising lipid bodies can be seen within the cytoplasm of A. roeperi spores and conidiogenous cells, which may represent a means of storage for energy-rich compounds that it then imparts to the feeding beetles.

Though trees and insects are perhaps the most pivotal points of Ambrosiella ecology, the galleries in which A. roeperi grows are not monocultures and other fungi, particularly yeasts, can often be found within and even seem to exceed the density of A. roeperi during certain seasons (for example, in the winter, when adult beetles remain dormant until their springtime emergence). It has been suggested that during the height of a beetle attack, the presence of ethanol – produced by stressed trees and sometimes even by the fungus itself – helps to select for the proliferation of A. roeperi over potential competitors such as molds, which are unable to effectively detoxify this compound.

The distribution of A. roeperi mirrors that of its insect partner and is thus quite expansive, both in terms of hosts and geographic range. X. crassiusculus has been reported feeding on woody plants from over 40 families, though it seems to prefer non-coniferous species (with the exception of cedars, from which infestations have been reported). Perhaps in part due to its capacity for extreme polyphagy, this beetle is highly invasive and has spread beyond its native range in southeast Asia to Africa (from tropical regions to the southern tip), Australia and New Zealand, Europe, South America, and the United States, taking A. roeperi with it.

== Significance ==
Among bark and ambrosia beetle pests that disperse various fungi, the degree to which the beetle and its symbiont are each responsible for causing host damage varies from system to system – for example, Harringtonia lauricola represents a true pathogen of Lauraceae vectored by Xyleborus glabratus, but others merely facilitate the mass accumulation of beetles on wood. A. roeperi and the symbionts of most other Xylosandrus fall into the latter category. As previously mentioned, X. crassiusculus is highly attracted to ethanol produced by stressed trees, in which they can kill twigs, branches, and saplings; this makes them of particular concern in settings such as nurseries and orchards, where the protrusion of noodle-like extrusions of beetle frass can be a diagnostic feature for this and other Xylosandrus. The potential for damage necessitates management techniques such as ensuring the growth of vigorous, unstressed stands by allowing more space between individual trees, keeping track of soil water content, selecting plants well-adapted to the climate, pruning infested twigs, monitoring beetle populations with ethanol-based lures, designating trap trees or logs, and applying insecticides (for example, through direct injection) [28]. Novel methods such as entomopathogenic or mycopathogenic microorganisms remain under exploration [29]. Ecologically, though biologists may be concerned about the downstream impact of beetle attacks on native plants such as oaks, cedars, maples, elms, redbud, magnolia, etc. [19], healthy trees outside of intensively managed environments are unlikely to sustain serious permanent damage from these insects.

Both in silvicultural and natural contexts, the beetles themselves remain the most problematic and worrisome components of the symbiosis, and A. roeperi is not in and of itself a severe tree disease, merely a critical foundation for X. crassiusculus nutrition. Disrupting the relationship between fungus and beetle may thus someday provide fruitful avenues for pest control.
