= Endoconidiophora =

Scientific classification
- Kingdom: Fungi
- Division: Ascomycota
- Class: Sordariomycetes
- Order: Microascales
- Family: Ceratocystidaceae
- Genus: Endoconidiophora; Münch 1907

Genus of fungi

Endoconidiophora is a genus of fungi within the Ceratocystidaceae family.

== Species ==
As accepted by Species Fungorum;

- Endoconidiophora coerulescens Münch (1907)
- Endoconidiophora douglasii (R.W. Davidson) Z.W. de Beer, T.A. Duong & M.J. Wingf. (2014)
- Endoconidiophora fujiensis (M.J. Wingf., Yamaoka & M. Marín) Z.W. de Beer, T.A. Duong & M.J. Wingf. (2014)
- Endoconidiophora laricicola (Redfern & Minter) Z.W. de Beer, T.A. Duong & M.J. Wingf. (2014)
- Endoconidiophora lunae Kitaj. (1936)
- Endoconidiophora pinicola (T.C. Harr. & M.J. Wingf.) Z.W. de Beer, T.A. Duong & M.J. Wingf. (2014)
- Endoconidiophora polonica (Siemaszko) Z.W. de Beer, T.A. Duong & M.J. Wingf. (2014)
- Endoconidiophora resinifera (T.C. Harr. & M.J. Wingf.) Z.W. de Beer, T.A. Duong & M.J. Wingf. (2014)
- Endoconidiophora rufipennis (M.J. Wingf., T.C. Harr. & H. Solheim) Z.W. de Beer, T.A. Duong & M.J. Wingf. (2014)

Former species (all Ceratocystidaceae family);

- E. adiposa (E.J. Butler) R.W. Davidson (1935) = Catunica adiposa
- E. bunae Kitaj. (1936) = Ceratocystis bunae
- E. coerulescens f. douglasii R.W. Davidson (1953) = Endoconidiophora douglasii
- E. fagacearum Bretz (1952) = Ceratocystis fagacearum
- E. fimbriata (Ellis & Halst.) R.W. Davidson (1935) = Ceratocystis fimbriata
- E. fimbriata f. platani J.M. Walter (1951) = Ceratocystis platani
- E. moniliformis (Hedgc.) R.W. Davidson (1935) = Huntiella moniliformis
- E. paradoxa (De Seynes) R.W. Davidson (1935) = Ceratocystis paradoxa
- E. variospora R.W. Davidson (1944) = Ceratocystis variospora
- E. virescens R.W. Davidson (1944) = Davidsoniella virescens
