= List of pineapple diseases =

This article is a list of diseases of pineapples (Ananas comosus).

== Bacterial diseases ==
Bacterial diseases
Bacterial heart rot	Erwinia chrysanthemi

== Bacterial diseases (fruit) ==
Bacterial diseases (fruit)
Acetic souring	Acetic acid bacteria
Bacterial fruitlet brown rot	Erwinia ananas pv. ananas
Fruit collapse	Erwinia chrysanthemi
Marbled fruit	Acetobacter spp. A. peroxydans Erwinia herbicola var. ananas
Pink fruit	Acetobacter aceti Erwinia herbicola Gluconobacter oxydans
Soft rot	Erwinia carotovora subsp. carotovora

== Fungal diseases ==
Fungal diseases
Anthracnose	Colletotrichum ananas
Pineapple black rot	Chalara paradoxa = Thielaviopsis paradoxa Ceratocystis paradoxa [teleomorph]
Leaf spot	Curvularia eragrostidis Cochliobolus eragrostidis [teleomorph]
Phytophthora heart rot	Phytophthora cinnamomi Phytophthora nicotianae var. parasitica = Phytophthora parasitica
Root rot	Pythium spp. Pythium arrhenomanes
Seedling blight	Pythium spp.
White leaf spot	Chalara paradoxa = Thielaviopsis paradoxa Ceratocystis paradoxa [teleomorph]

== Fungal diseases (fruit) ==
Fungal diseases (fruit)
Aspergillus rot	Aspergillus flavus
Botryodiplodia rot	Lasiodiplodia theobromae = Botryodiplodia theobromae
Black rot (water blister)	Chalara paradoxa = Thielaviopsis paradoxa Ceratocystis paradoxa [teleomorph]
Fusariosis (gummosis)	Fusarium subglutinans = Fusarium moniliforme var. subglutinans
Glassy spoilage	Yeast species
Hendersonula fruit rot	Hendersonula toruloidea
Interfruitlet corking	Penicillium funiculosum
Leathery pocket	Penicillium funiculosum
Nigrospora fruit rot	Nigrospora sphaerica
Phytophthora	Phytophthora nicotianae var. parasitica
Rhizopus rot	Rhizopus oryzae Rhizopus stolonifer
Yeasty fermentation	Yeast species

== Nematodes, parasitic ==
diseases
Lesion	Paratylenchus brachyurus Paratylenchus elachistus = Paratylenchus minutus
Reniform	Rotylenchulus reniformis
Root-knot	Meloidogyne javanica
Spiral	Helicotylenchus spp.

== Virus and viruslike diseases ==
diseases
Mealybug wilt	Unconfirmed virus/toxin
Terminal mottle	Unconfirmed virus/toxin
Yellow spot	Tomato spotted wilt virus

== Miscellaneous diseases or disorders (fruit) ==
Fruit diseases or disorders (miscellaneous)
Internal browning	Physiological (chill injury)
Radial brown stripe	Physiological
Triad rot	Unknown
Y-center rot	Unknown
Woody fruit	Genetic

== See also ==
- List of foliage plant diseases (Bromeliaceae)
