= Ceratocystis pluriannulata =

Scientific classification
- Kingdom: Fungi
- Division: Ascomycota
- Class: Sordariomycetes
- Order: Microascales
- Family: Ceratocystidaceae
- Genus: Ceratocystis
- Species: C. pluriannulata

Binomial name
- Ceratocystis pluriannulata (Hedgc.) C. Moreau, (1952)

Synonyms
- Ceratostomella pluriannulata Ophiostoma pluriannulatum

Species of fungus

Ceratocystis pluriannulata is a fungal plant pathogen. It is distinguishable from a similar species called Ceratocystis californica due to the latter's smaller perithecia and narrower conidia.
