= Ambrosiella grosmanniae =

Scientific classification
- Kingdom: Fungi
- Division: Ascomycota
- Class: Sordariomycetes
- Order: Microascales
- Family: Ceratocystidaceae
- Genus: Ambrosiella
- Species: A. grosmanniae

Binomial name
- Ambrosiella grosmanniae C.Mayers, McNew & T.C.Harr. (2015)

Species of fungus

Ambrosiella grosmanniae is a species of fungus in the family Ceratocystidaceae. It is carried and grown by Xylosandrus germanus, the black stem borer.
