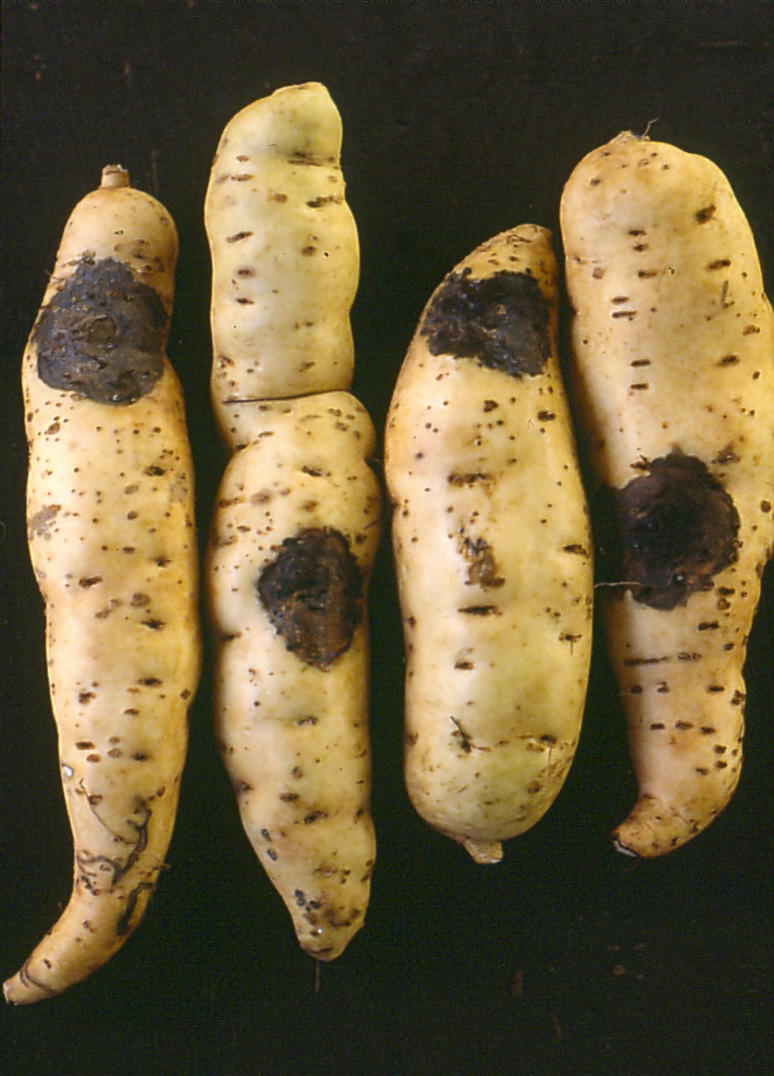
- Sweet potato black rot caused by Ceratocystis fimbriata

Scientific classification
- Kingdom: Fungi
- Division: Ascomycota
- Class: Sordariomycetes
- Order: Microascales
- Family: Ceratocystidaceae
- Genus: Ceratocystis
- Species: C. fimbriata

Binomial name
- Ceratocystis fimbriata Ellis & Halst. (1890)

Synonyms
- Ceratocystis moniliformis f. coffeae; Ceratostomella fimbriata; Endoconidiophora fimbriata; Ophiostoma coffeae; Ophiostoma fimbriatum

= Ceratocystis fimbriata =

Species of fungus

Ceratocystis fimbriata is a fungus and a plant pathogen, attacking such diverse plants as the sweet potato (black rot) and the tapping panels of the Para rubber tree (moldy rot). It is a diverse species that attacks a wide variety of annual and perennial plants. There are several host-specialized strains, some of which, such as Ceratocystis platani that attacks plane trees, are now described as distinct species.

== Taxonomy ==
Ceratocystis fimbriata, the type species of the genus Ceratocystis, was originally described on the sweet potato (Ipomoea batatus) in 1890. It has since been found on a wide variety of annual and perennial plants. It is a large, diverse complex of species that cause wilt-type diseases of many economically important plants. There are thought to be three broad geographic clades, the North American, the Latin American and the Asian clades.

It is thought likely that Ceratocystis fimbriata contains many undescribed, hidden species. One form of the fungus that causes a wilt disease in cacao was in 2005 described as a new species Ceratocystis cacaofunesta. Another form that causes a disease on plane trees (Platanus), and which was previously known as Ceratocystis fimbriata f. platani, was in 2005 elevated to species Ceratocystis platani.

=== Host and symptoms ===
Ceratocystis fimbriata is an ascomycete fungal pathogen. The species as a whole can infect a wide variety of hosts, but particular strains are host-specific. One example is the Ipomoea form of the fungus, which is specific to sweet potato (Ipomea batatas) and wild morning glory. Symptoms can be found on the fleshy root or visible in plants. On sweet potato, Ceratocystis fimbriata causes a disease called 'black rot,' which displays firm and dry circular brown/black rots. Infected plants often show stunted growth, wilting, and yellowing. Wilting occurs because this pathogen can also travel through xylem and infect vascular system. During disease, white, fuzzy mycelia with long black perithecia grow out from the lesions. Additionally, research demonstrates that sweet potatoes infected with C. fimbriata demonstrate increased respiration which is partially due to the infection's influence on protein metabolism. Higher respiration rates cause dry weight loss in the tubers which poses a problem for marketability.

== Diseases ==
=== Black rot of sweet potato ===
The Ipomoea form of the fungus that attacks the sweet potato (Ipomoea batatas), is thought likely to be native to Latin America, as is the sweet potato itself. It has spread to many locations probably on storage roots. The fungus may appear as a dry, black rot, usually with perithecia and ascospores. In some countries (such as China and Japan) it is an important constraint to sweet potato production. In other areas (such as southeastern USA) the damage is less severe due to the use of resistant varieties and sanitary measures. Fungicides can be used in sweet potato fields or as post-harvest dips of sweet potato roots.

=== Disease cycle ===
Ceratocystis fimbriata produces ascospores, and these spores are found at the top of fruiting bodies known as perithecia. There are also chlamydospores, which aid in survival as they overwinter in the soil and on roots.

Chlamydospores survive on infected roots/slips or in the soil and develop on the next season's plant material during spring. Then, mycelium produce long, black perithecia (fruiting structures) that have a sticky mass of ascospores at the top. These ascospores enter and infect new plants through wounds on any part of the plant/tuber/etc and are commonly dispersed by insects, wind, and equipment. After infecting tubers, the disease can be spread up the xylem tissue of the stem causing wilt. Ultimately, this pathogen will continue its lifecycle through vegetative propagation (transplants) of diseased tissue or chlamydospores that overwinter in roots or soil to spread the disease into the next season.

=== Environment ===
Environmental conditions such as temperature and nutrient levels are important for C. fimbriata's success. Specifically, temperatures ranging from 23-27 degrees Celsius encourage sporulation and disease growth. Also, pre-sprouting roots at warm temperature favors disease and should be avoided when growing sweet potatoes. This is because roots infected with black rot produce sprouts that frequently rot at the attachment point of the root or the roots develop lesions on the stem that rot below ground. Boron deficiencies in the soil can also enhance the disease. Since many sweet potatoes are grown from roots or slips, any diseased tissue present can lead to more widespread infection.

=== Management ===
In order to prevent black rot, it's absolutely essential to avoid using infected seed roots as this is a major way of disease transmission. Host resistance has been found and used successfully against C. fimbriata on sweet potatoes. It is also recommended to perform crop rotation every 2–3 years. Importantly, fungicides only work on seeds and sweet potato slips so if C. fimbriata is already established, fungicides will not control or eliminate disease. Thiabendazole and difenoconazole are effective on C. fimbriata. Finally, good management practices include cleaning all equipment to prevent disease spread. Tubers should be washed and dried before storage and this storage should be in ventilated boxes/crates to eliminate environmental conditions conducive to fungal growth.

=== Mouldy rot of rubber ===
On rubber trees (Hevea brasiliensis), C. fimbriata attacks the tapping panel, causing a pale-grey mould on the surface of the panel and dark discoloration in the wood under the surface. Fungicides can be used to treat tapping panels of Hevea.

=== Wilt and canker of coffee ===
A fungus attacking Coffea in Indonesia was described as Rostrella coffea in 1900 and this species was synonymized with Ceratocystis fimbriata in 1951. It is widespread in Central America and northern South America, and is a particularly damaging disease in Colombia.

=== Mango wilt ===
Mango wilt is known only in Brazil, even though mango trees (Mangifera indica) are grown in other areas where C. fimbriata is common on other plants. Infection typically occurs through fresh wounds on trees although root infections also occur. Infection is often accompanied by secondary attack by various ambrosia beetles.

=== Ficus wilt ===
Ficus wilt is a severe disease found in fig trees (Ficus carica) in Brazil. There is also an Asian form of Ficus wilt caused by C. fimbriata found in southern Japan.

=== Rapid 'Ohi'a death ===
A fungus initially identified as a form of Ceratocystis fimbriata was identified in 2015 as the cause of widespread mortality in 'ohi'a trees (Metrosideros polymorpha) in the Puna District on the island of Hawai'i. The source of the outbreak is currently unknown. In April 2018, researchers published descriptions of two species of Ceratocystis new to science that are believed to be responsible for rapid 'ohi'a death: C. huliohia and C. lukuohia. The specific names are derived from the Hawai'ian language, meaning "changes the natural state of 'ohi'a" and "destroyer of 'ohi'a", respectively. In May 2018, it was reported that infected 'ohi'a trees have been found on the Hawai'ian island of Kauai. The public has been asked to avoid transportation of 'ohi'a trees or products to slow the spread of the disease.

=== In other plants ===
Many other plants are harmed by C. fimbriata. It has caused serious mortality in Eucalyptus plantations in Brazil as well as in the Congo and Uganda. Almonds (Prunus dulcis) in California have been affected by the disease. It has also caused losses in pomegranates (Punica granatum) in India. It causes a dark, dry rot in Taro tubers.
