= Ceratocystis cacaofunesta =

Scientific classification
- Domain: Eukaryota
- Kingdom: Fungi
- Division: Ascomycota
- Class: Sordariomycetes
- Order: Microascales
- Family: Ceratocystidaceae
- Genus: Ceratocystis
- Species: C. cacaofunesta

Binomial name
- Ceratocystis cacaofunesta Engelbr. & T.C.Harr. (2005)

Species of fungus

Ceratocystis cacaofunesta is an ascomycete fungus that causes a wilt disease in cacao trees. It has led to significant economic losses in Latin America.

== Taxonomy ==
Once considered to be a form of Ceratocystis fimbriata, the fungus was described as a new species in 2005. The specific epithet "cacaofunesta" means "cacao-killing". Two closely related sublineages exist within this species, one centered in western Ecuador and the other containing isolates from Brazil, Colombia and Costa Rica.

== Ceratocystis wilt of cacao ==
The disease known as "Ceratocystis wilt of cacao" (or "Mal de machete") is a serious disease of the cocoa tree (Theobroma cacao) in Latin America. The fungus is indigenous to Central and South America.

This fungus is able to penetrate cacao trees through stem wounds that are caused either by insects or through infected cutting tools. Wounds made by harvesting pods, removing stem sprouts or weeding may become infected. The disease is a systemic infection that damages the entire plant. The fungus enters its host through the xylem, causing a deep stain leading to the obstruction of water and nutrient transport. It moves systemically through the plant. Eventually, the plant turns yellow and then brown, leading to wilting and the sudden death of the tree.

The disease has been of major importance in Costa Rica, Trinidad and Tobago, Ecuador, parts of Colombia and Venezuela. In the 1990s, C. cacaofunesta was introduced to the southern region of Bahia, which is the largest Brazilian cacao-producing state. This disease is responsible for reductions in the cacao population in plantation areas, which has resulted in great economic losses in the affected regions. The fungus has killed as many as half of the trees in some locations.
