= Ceratocystis tanganyicensis =

Scientific classification
- Domain: Eukaryota
- Kingdom: Fungi
- Division: Ascomycota
- Class: Sordariomycetes
- Order: Microascales
- Family: Ceratocystidaceae
- Genus: Ceratocystis
- Species: C. tanganyicensis

Binomial name
- Ceratocystis tanganyicensis Heath at al., 2009

Species of fungus

Ceratocystis tanganyicensis is a plant-pathogenic saprobic fungal species first found in Africa, infecting Acacia mearnsii and Eucalyptus species.
