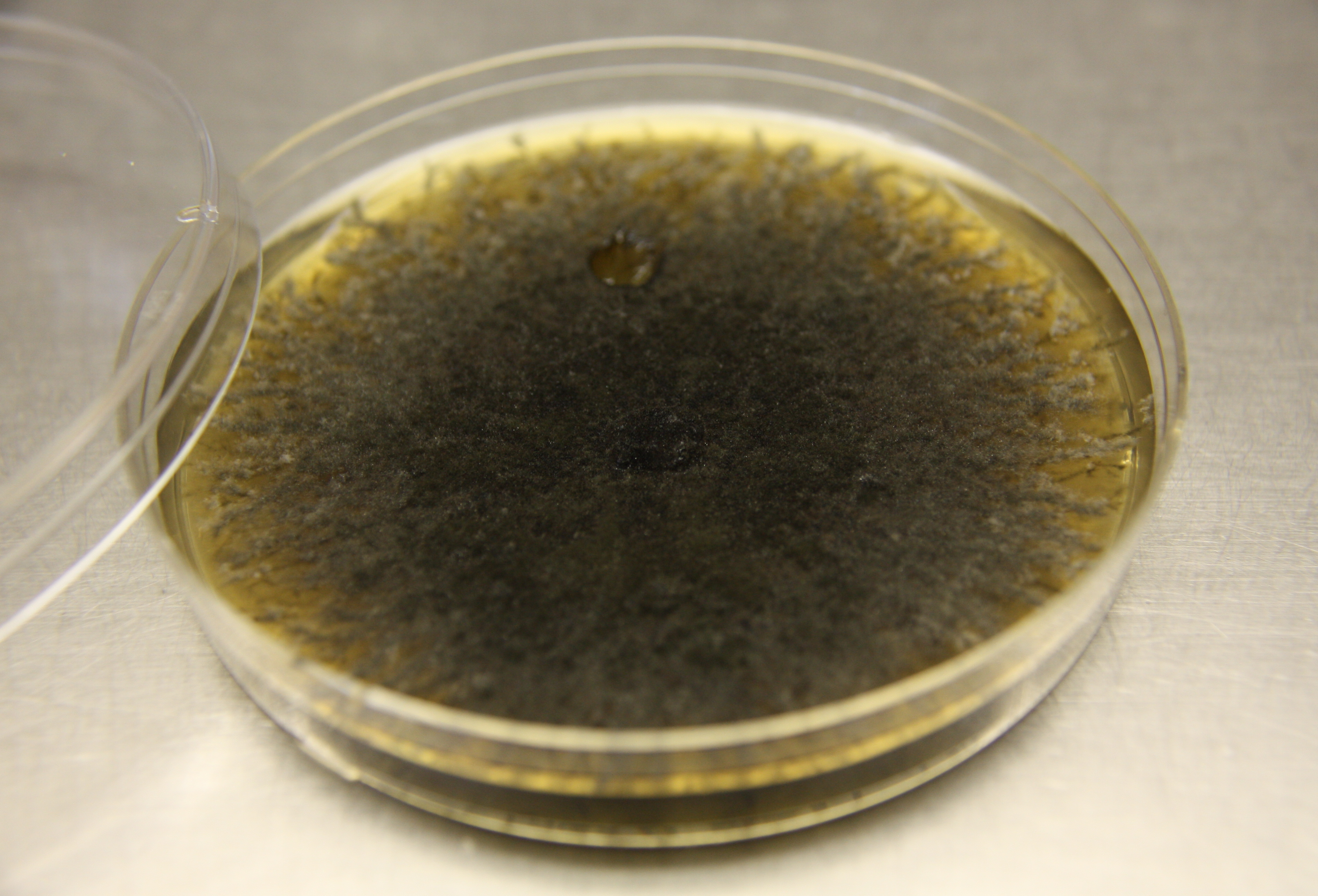
- A culture of Ceratocystis resinifera

Scientific classification
- Domain: Eukaryota
- Kingdom: Fungi
- Division: Ascomycota
- Class: Sordariomycetes
- Order: Microascales
- Family: Ceratocystidaceae
- Genus: Ceratocystis; Ellis & Halst. (1890)

Species
- See text

= Ceratocystis =

Genus of fungi

Ceratocystis is a genus of fungi in the family Ceratocystidaceae. Several species are important plant pathogens, causing diseases such as oak wilt and pineapple black rot.

== Species ==
- Ceratocystis acericola
- Ceratocystis acoma
- Ceratocystis adiposa
- Ceratocystis aequivaginata
- Ceratocystis albida
- Ceratocystis albofundus
- Ceratocystis angusticoolis
- Ceratocystis antennaroidospora
- Ceratocystis arborea
- Ceratocystis asteroides
- Ceratocystis atrox
- Ceratocystis autographa
- Ceratocystis bhutanensis
- Ceratocystis brunneocrinita
- Ceratocystis bunae
- Ceratocystis buxi
- Ceratocystis cacaofunesta
- Ceratocystis californica
- Ceratocystis capitata
- Ceratocystis caryae
- Ceratocystis castaneae
- Ceratocystis catoniana
- Ceratocystis chinaeucensis
- Ceratocystis coerulescens
- Ceratocystis colombiana
- Ceratocystis columnaris
- Ceratocystis comata
- Ceratocystis concentrica
- Ceratocystis conicicollis
- Ceratocystis corymbiicola
- Ceratocystis crenulata
- Ceratocystis curvicollis
- Ceratocystis deltoideospora
- Ceratocystis denticulata
- Ceratocystis dolominuta
- Ceratocystis douglasii
- Ceratocystis erinaceus
- Ceratocystis eucalypti
- Ceratocystis eucastaneae
- Ceratocystis fagacearum
- Ceratocystis fasciata
- Ceratocystis ficicola
- Ceratocystis filiformis
- Ceratocystis fimbriata
- Ceratocystis fimbriatomima
- Ceratocystis fujiensis
- Ceratocystis gossypina
- Ceratocystis grandicarpa
- Ceratocystis grandifoliae
- Ceratocystis horanszkyi
- Ceratocystis huliohia
- Ceratocystis hyalothecium
- Ceratocystis imperfecta
- Ceratocystis inquinans
- Ceratocystis introcitrina
- Ceratocystis ips
- Ceratocystis laricicola
- Ceratocystis larium
- Ceratocystis leptographioides
- Ceratocystis leucocarpa
- Ceratocystis longispora
- Ceratocystis lukuohia
- Ceratocystis magnifica
- Ceratocystis manginecans
- Ceratocystis merolinensis
- Ceratocystis microbasis
- Ceratocystis microcarpa
- Ceratocystis microsperma
- Ceratocystis miniata
- Ceratocystis minima
- Ceratocystis minor
- Ceratocystis minuta
- Ceratocystis minuta-bicolor
- Ceratocystis moniliformis
- Ceratocystis moniliformopsis
- Ceratocystis montium
- Ceratocystis multiannulata
- Ceratocystis musarum
- Ceratocystis narcissi
- Ceratocystis neglecta
- Ceratocystis nigra
- Ceratocystis nigrocarpa
- Ceratocystis norvegica
- Ceratocystis nothofagi
- Ceratocystis novae-zelandiae
- Ceratocystis oblonga
- Ceratocystis obpyriformis
- Ceratocystis obscura
- Ceratocystis ochracea
- Ceratocystis olivaceapini
- Ceratocystis omanensis
- Ceratocystis ossiformis
- Ceratocystis pallida
- Ceratocystis papillata
- Ceratocystis paradoxa
- Ceratocystis parva
- Ceratocystis piceiperda
- Ceratocystis pidoplichikovii
- Ceratocystis pilifera
- Ceratocystis pinicola
- Ceratocystis pirilliformis
- Ceratocystis platani
- Ceratocystis pluriannulata
- Ceratocystis polychroma
- Ceratocystis polyconidia
- Ceratocystis ponderosae
- Ceratocystis populicola
- Ceratocystis prolifera
- Ceratocystis pseudominor
- Ceratocystis pseudonigra
- Ceratocystis pseudotsugae
- Ceratocystis radicicola
- Ceratocystis resinifera
- Ceratocystis rostrocylindrica
- Ceratocystis rufipennis
- Ceratocystis savannae
- Ceratocystis schrenkiana
- Ceratocystis smalleyi
- Ceratocystis spinifera
- Ceratocystis spinulosa
- Ceratocystis stenoceras
- Ceratocystis stenospora
- Ceratocystis subannulata
- Ceratocystis sumatrana
- Ceratocystis tanganyicensis
- Ceratocystis tetropii
- Ceratocystis torticiliata
- Ceratocystis torulosa
- Ceratocystis tribiliformis
- Ceratocystis truncicola
- Ceratocystis tsitsikammensis
- Ceratocystis tubicollis
- Ceratocystis tyalla
- Ceratocystis variospora
- Ceratocystis vesca
- Ceratocystis virescens
- Ceratocystis zombamontana
