= Sporendocladia =

Scientific classification
- Kingdom: Fungi
- Division: Ascomycota
- Class: Sordariomycetes
- Order: Microascales
- Family: Ceratocystidaceae
- Genus: Sporendocladia; G.Arnaud ex Nag Raj & W.B.Kendr. (1975)

Type species
- Sporendocladia castaneae G.Arnaud ex Nag Raj & W.B.Kendr. (1975)

Species
- S. bactrospora S. castaneae S. foliicola S. fumosa S. ivoriensis S. kionochaetoides S. truncata

Synonyms
- Sporendocladia G.Arnaud (1954)

Genus of fungi

Sporendocladia is a genus of anamorphic fungi in the family Ceratocystidaceae. The widespread genus contains seven species.
