= Gondwanamyces =

Scientific classification
- Kingdom: Fungi
- Division: Ascomycota
- Class: Sordariomycetes
- Order: Microascales
- Family: Ceratocystidaceae
- Genus: Gondwanamyces; G.J.Marais & M.J.Wingf. (1998)

Type species
- Gondwanamyces proteae (M.J.Wingf., P.S.van Wyk & Marasas) G.J.Marais & M.J.Wingf. (1998)

Species
- G. capensis G. cecropiae G. proteae G. scolytodis G. serotectus G. ubusi

Genus of fungi

Gondwanamyces is a genus of fungi in the family Ceratocystidaceae. The genus was circumscribed in 1998.
