= Ambrosiella beaveri =

Scientific classification
- Kingdom: Fungi
- Division: Ascomycota
- Class: Sordariomycetes
- Order: Microascales
- Family: Ceratocystidaceae
- Genus: Ambrosiella
- Species: A. beaveri

Binomial name
- Ambrosiella beaveri Six, Z.W. de Beer & W.D. Stone

Species of ambrosia fungus

Ambrosiella beaveri is a fungus that is most commonly known as a symbiont of the camphor shot borer, Cnestus mutilatus. In this obligate mutualism, A. beaveri (an ambrosia fungus) relies on C. mutilatus (an ambrosia beetle) for transmission to and from dead or dying trees. In turn, A. beaveri serves as the sole source of nutrition for its ambrosia beetle host and its progeny.

== Taxonomy ==
In 2009, Ambrosiella beaveri was officially described by Diana L. Six, Z. Wilhelm de Beer, and W. Doug Stone after the researchers isolated and cultured the fungus from Cnestus mutilatus mycangia. These A. beaveri cultures were from C. mutilatus beetles collected in upland hardwood forest in Winston Co., Mississippi, USA. A. beaveri is named after Roger A. Beaver to recognize his contributions to ambrosia beetle research.

C. mutilatus, and A. beaveri assumedly from its obligate partnership with C. mutilatus, is non-native to the United States. This ambrosia beetle was first reported in the United States in 1999 after it was found in Oktibbeha County, Mississippi. C. mutilatus is native to Asia and was described by Walter Fielding Holloway Blanford in 1894. The time spanning between the description of C. mutilatus and the description of A. beaveri highlights the significance of future research on other understudied and/or undescribed ambrosia fungi.

The Ambrosiella genus is an anamorphic ascomycete group derived from Ceratocystis (Microascales). Research on the phylogenetic placement of Ambrosiella and other ambrosia fungi is expanding as advancing sampling techniques and systematics uncover more independent evolutionary origins of ambrosia fungi. Phylogenetic analysis of ITS/LSU and β-tubulin DNA sequences have revealed that Ambrosiella beaveri is closely related to other Ambrosiella species, specifically A. hartigii, and A. xylebori, which are also officially described ambrosia fungi.

== Morphology ==
Diana L. Six, Z. Wilhelm de Beer, and W. Doug Stone published their description of Ambrosiella beaveri in 2009. In their research article, they focused on both macroscopic and microscopic features of the fungi as it grew on agar.

=== Macroscopic Features ===
When culturing their A. beaveri isolates, the researchers incubated the fungal colonies for 10-days on oatmeal agar at 25°C. In that time, the colonies grew to 45 mm (1.8 in) in diameter and grew effuse across the agar. The outermost rim of the colony (the sepia margin) was a "dull Dark Mouse Grey." A. beaveri isolates had abundant "white to buff" sporodochia that became an "olivaceous buff" after 14 days. The surface had scattered clear, glistening, and brown droplets. Arial hyphae grew up to 8mm above the colony. On the underside of the isolates, the colony looked pale mouse grey, and the agar was stained a deep brown. A. beaveri emitted a strong, foul odor similar to butyric acid.

=== Microscopic Features ===
A. beaveri mycelium is superficial or immersed, and the mycelium has cells 6–25 μm long and 3–10 μm thick. Hyphae are light brown, melanized, and septate. A. beaveri hyphae form thick-walled asexual spores known as chlamydospores. These chlamydospores are spherical and are found along the hyphal strand between other cells. In non-sporodochial areas (which are grey), the conidiophores are melanized, light brown, 11-81 μm long, and 3–8 μm wide. These conidiospores are distinct from other vegetative hyphae (macronematous) and are solitary and isolated (mononematous). Conidia are thick-walled, solitary or catenate, 8–14 μm wide, and 8-14 μm long. The conidia are initially hyaline but later become light brown. In sporodochial areas, conidiophores are "maconematous, mononematous, septate," and 25–196 μm long. Conidia here are thin-walled, hyaline, solitary or catenate, 7–25 μm long, and 5–20 μm wide.

Ambrosiella beaveri looks morphologically similar to Ambrosiella hartigii, but A. beaveri differs in that chlamydospores are present, conidiophores are longer, and conidia are larger. When describing Ambrosiella species in Taiwan, another team of researchers found that A. beaveri differed from 4 other Ambrosiella species (A. nakashimae, A. grosmanniae, A. roeperi, and A. catenulata) from the production of phialoconidia from deeply seated phialides that typically results in more than 5 phialoconidia in a chain.

== Ecology ==
Ambrosiella, like other common ambrosia fungi such as Raffaelea and Fusarium, belong to a phytopathogenic family. Most ambrosia fungi, including A. beaveri, do not degrade wood. Instead, these fungi rapidly uptake nutrients from dead or dying trees (in most cases).

Since its description in 2009, A. beaveri has been recognized as the obligate mutualistic fungal symbiont of C. mutilatus. However, there is growing evidence that other ambrosia beetles may also be associated with A. beaveri. These ambrosia beetle species include: Xylosandrus amputatus, Cnestus murayamai, Hadrodemius comans, Hadrodemius globus, Xylosandrus borealis, Xylosandrus brevis, Xylosandrus discolor, and Xylosandrus mancus.

Cnestus mutilatus is known to bore into and spread Ambrosiella beaveri to a wide range of plants. This includes "Acer rubrum L., A. saccharum Marsh., A. palmatum Thunb., Ostrya virginiana (Mill.) K. Koch., Cornus florida L., Fagus grandifolia Ehrh., Liquidamber styraciflua L., Carya spp., Liriodendron tulipifera L., Melia azedarach L., Pinus taeda L., Prunus serotina Ehrh., Pr. americana Marsh., Ulmus alata Michaux, and Vitus rotundifolia Michaux." Typically, C. mutilatus will bore into sick, dying, or freshly dead trees. Rather than A. beaveri being a detrimental pathogen to these plant species, the C. mutilatus host is an indirect vector of other pathogens due to the frass it pushes out the tree as it bores its gallery. If C. mutilatus bores into a sick tree, it can release infectious aleurioconidia that can infect surrounding plants.

Being the obligate symbiont of Cnestus mutilatus, Ambrosiella beaveri is found alongside its beetle partner in dead or dying trees. After all, A. beaveri, like other ambrosia fungi, depends on its beetle partner for dispersal. In fact, ambrosia fungi are commonly carried in specialized organs or pits on the ambrosia beetle called mycangia. In the ambrosia beetle mycangia, the ambrosia fungi grow in a yeast-like phase. Researchers wanting to culture ambrosia fungi like A. beaveri can collect it from the beetle's mycangia. The native range of C. mutilatus is broadly listed as Asia. Recent research has found both C. mutilatus and A. beaveri in Taiwan and South Korea. C. mutilatus has been introduced in the United States and has spread (along with A. beaveri) across the Southeastern United States.

== Significance ==
Though Cnestus mutilatus may infect living trees and release Ambrosiella beaveri within the tree, the beetle-fungi pair are mostly regarded as a harmless pest. Together, they can cause cosmetic damage, but this is mostly due to the wood boring behavior of C. mutilatus rather than A. beaveri activity in the plant. The majority of ambrosia beetles and their associated fungi have "minimal effect on human industries." As mentioned before, there is a potential for C. mutilatus to be an indirect vector of plant pathogens living in the plants it bores into. Though C. mutilatus is not currently a major pest, it has the potential to become one as it expands its range within the USA, which is predicted to happen due to changes in climatic conditions. C. mutilatus can and been shown to colonize living, stressed trees like those in nurseries and young orchards. However, A. beaveri is not considered a major plant pathogen, but it provides nutrients to the ambrosia beetle that has the potential to be a major insect vector and pest.
