= Ceratocystis tyalla =

Scientific classification
- Kingdom: Fungi
- Division: Ascomycota
- Class: Sordariomycetes
- Order: Microascales
- Family: Ceratocystidaceae
- Genus: Ceratocystis
- Species: C. tyalla

Binomial name
- Ceratocystis tyalla Nkuekam et al., 2012

Species of fungus

Ceratocystis tyalla is a plant pathogen, affecting Australian Eucalyptus species. It was first isolated from tree wounds and nitidulid beetles associated with these wounds.
