= Soil-borne pathogen =

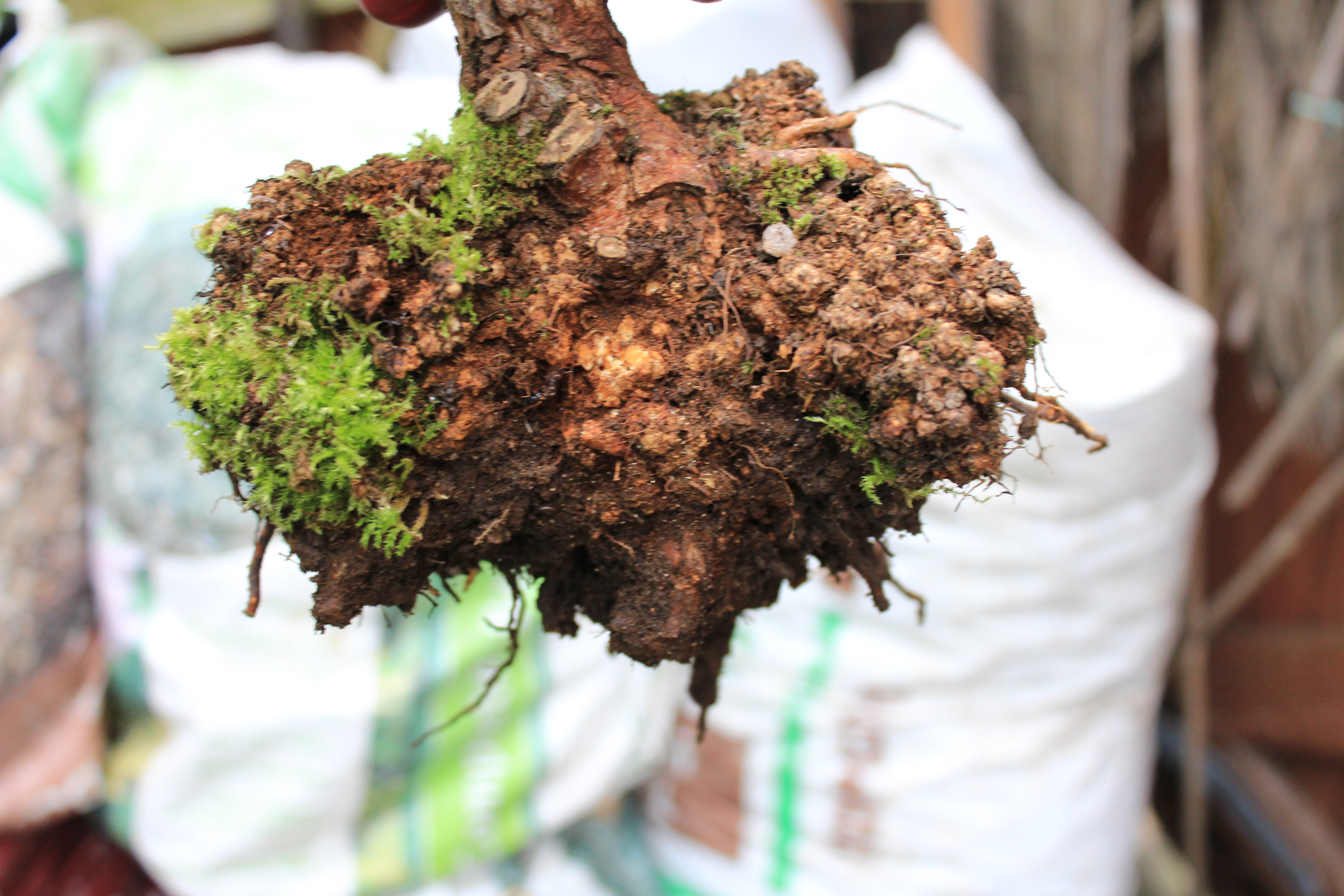
Crown gall on rose

A soil-borne pathogen (or soilborne pathogen) is a disease-causing agent which lives both in soil and in a plant host, and which will tend to infect undiseased plants which are grown in that soil. Common soil borne pathogens include Fusarium, Pythium, Rhizoctonia, Phytophthora, Verticillium, Rhizopus, Thielaviopsis, and nematodes including Meloidogyne.
