= Ceratocystis coerulescens =

Scientific classification
- Kingdom: Fungi
- Division: Ascomycota
- Class: Sordariomycetes
- Order: Microascales
- Family: Ceratocystidaceae
- Genus: Ceratocystis
- Species: C. coerulescens

Binomial name
- Ceratocystis coerulescens (Münch) B.K. Bakshi, (1950)

Synonyms
- Ceratostomella coerulescens Endoconidiophora coerulescens Ophiostoma coerulescens

Species of fungus

Ceratocystis coerulescens is an ascomycete fungus and the causal agent of sapstreak disease in sugar maple trees. There is debate about whether it is one species or two; the second being Ceratocystis virescens. For simplicity, this page will refer to this pathogen as one species. It is also known by its anamorph name Endoconidiophora virescens.

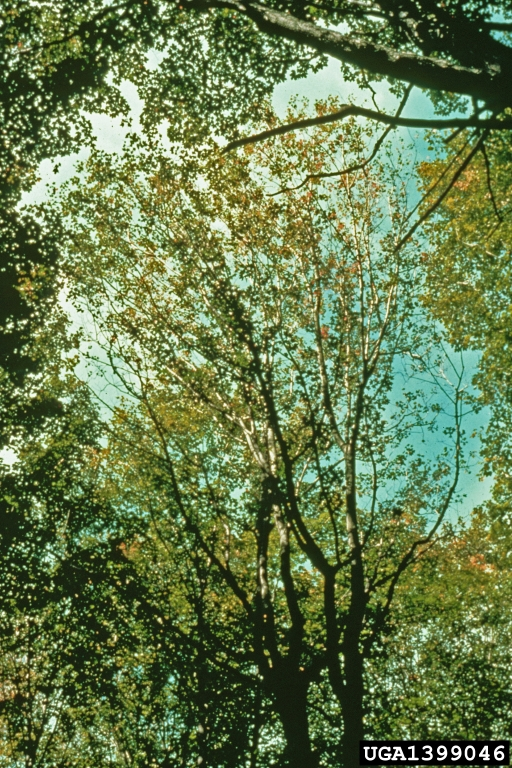
a sugar maple with dwarfed leaves, a symptom of sapstreak disease

== Host and symptoms ==
This fungus is often found as a saprophyte on logs of woody species. It causes sapstreak disease in just one host species: Acer saccharum, commonly known as the sugar maple or rock maple. Symptoms include a sparse crown, dieback, dwarfed leaves, and cankers. Infected trees may die suddenly or languish for 2–4 years. The symptom most characteristic of sapstreak disease is yellowish-green stained wood that is also very moist. Once the wood is cut and dries, the stains turn light brown, so they're difficult to see and diagnose at that point.

== Disease cycle ==
As an ascomycete, Ceratocystis coerulescens produces ascospores encased as groups of eight in asci. The asci are protected by a perithecium, a flask-shaped ascocarp, in which the pathogen overwinters. Ascospores are the sexual spores and are far less common than the asexual spores known as conidia. The conidia form on conidiophores without a sporocarp. C. coerulescens has two mating types referred to as Mat-1 and Mat-2, but it is not a strictly heterothallic species. The Mat-1 type is self-sterile and must cross with Mat-2 to produce perithecia. However, the Mat-2 type is self-fertile and half of the progeny from a Mat-2 selfing are Mat-1.

== Environment ==
Sapstreak disease has occurred only in North America and primarily in sugar bushes, stands of Acer saccharum that are tapped for maple sap. There has been a single report of it in Ontario, Canada; and cases in the U.S. have been from California, Michigan, Minnesota, New York, North Carolina, Vermont, and Wisconsin. As with all fungi, it requires a moist environment to sporulate.

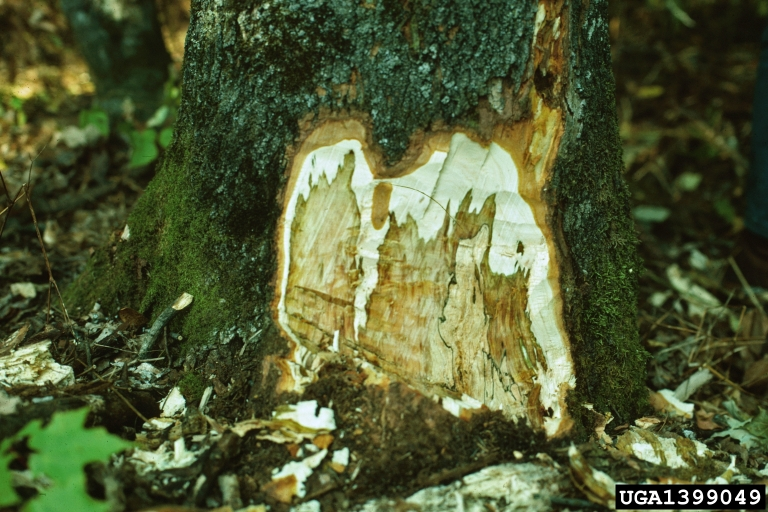
a wounded buttress root with the characteristic stain of sapstreak disease

== Pathogenesis ==
Ceratocystis coerulescens enters its host through wounds, especially wounds in buttress roots and lower trunk. All diseased trees have been found to have man-made wounds from tapping and/or driving and dragging logs over them. Therefore, it's believed that the trees successfully combat the pathogen when it enters wounds higher up made by animals, insects, or weather. Sapstreak disease is commonly associated with the presence of opportunistic fungi Armillaria and/or Xylaria.

== Importance ==
Sapstreak threatens maple syrup production primarily, but also ruins the wood for making lumber. The economic and environmental damage due to this pathogen is currently meager. Most instances have occurred after incautious logging and have been well contained. Usually a single tree or a small group is affected.

== Management ==
The best way to manage this disease is to prevent it by avoiding injuries to the roots and lower stems of sugar maples. This can be accomplished by using the same, well-placed trails every year through the sugar bush and by using tubing systems instead of buckets to collect sap. When infection does occur, the tree should be cut down and the wood promptly removed to reduce inoculum.
