= Gabarnaudia =

Scientific classification
- Kingdom: Fungi
- Division: Ascomycota
- Class: Sordariomycetes
- Order: Microascales
- Family: incertae sedis
- Genus: Gabarnaudia Samson & W.Gams (1974)

Type species
- Gabarnaudia betae (Delacr.) Samson & W.Gams (1974)

Genus of fungi

Gabarnaudia is a genus of anamorphic fungi that was placed in the family Ceratocystidaceae, until phylogenetic analysis by Hausner and Reid (2004) and De Beer et al. (2013a) showed that Gabarnaudia fimicola G. betae and G. humicola clustered within genus Sphaeronaemella (Melanconiellaceae, Diaporthomycetidae class).

The genus was circumscribed in 1974 and is named in honor of French mycologist Gabriel Arnaud. In 2008, it formerly contained five species that were known from Asia and Europe. Until 3 species were transferred to Ceratostomataceae family

Hyde et al. (2020c) and Wijayawardene et al. (2022) placed Gabarnaudia in Microascales genera incertae sedis.

== Species ==
As accepted by Species Fungorum;

- Gabarnaudia cucumeris (Peck) de Hoog & W. Gams (1986)
- Gabarnaudia tholispora Samson & W. Gams (1974)

Former species;

- G. betae (Delacr.) Samson & W. Gams (1974) = Sphaeronaemella betae, Ceratostomataceae
- G. fimicola Samson & W. Gams (1974) = Sphaeronaemella fimicola, Ceratostomataceae
- G. humicola Samson & W. Gams (1974) = Sphaeronaemella humicola, Ceratostomataceae
