= List of foliage plant diseases (Bromeliaceae) =

This is a list of diseases of foliage plants belonging to the family Bromeliaceae.

== Plant Species ==
Plant Species
A	Aechmea fasciata	urn plant
C	Cryptanthus	bromeliad

== Bacterial diseases ==
Bacterial diseases
Bacterial leaf spot	Erwinia carotovora subsp. carotovora	A

== Fungal diseases ==
Fungal diseases
Common name	Scientific name	Plants affected
Anthracnose	Colletotrichum spp.	C
Helminthosporium leaf spot	Setosphaeria rostrata Exserohilum rostratum [anamorph] = Helminthosporium rostratum	A
Rhizoctonia leaf spot	Rhizoctonia solani	A

== See also ==
- List of pineapple diseases
