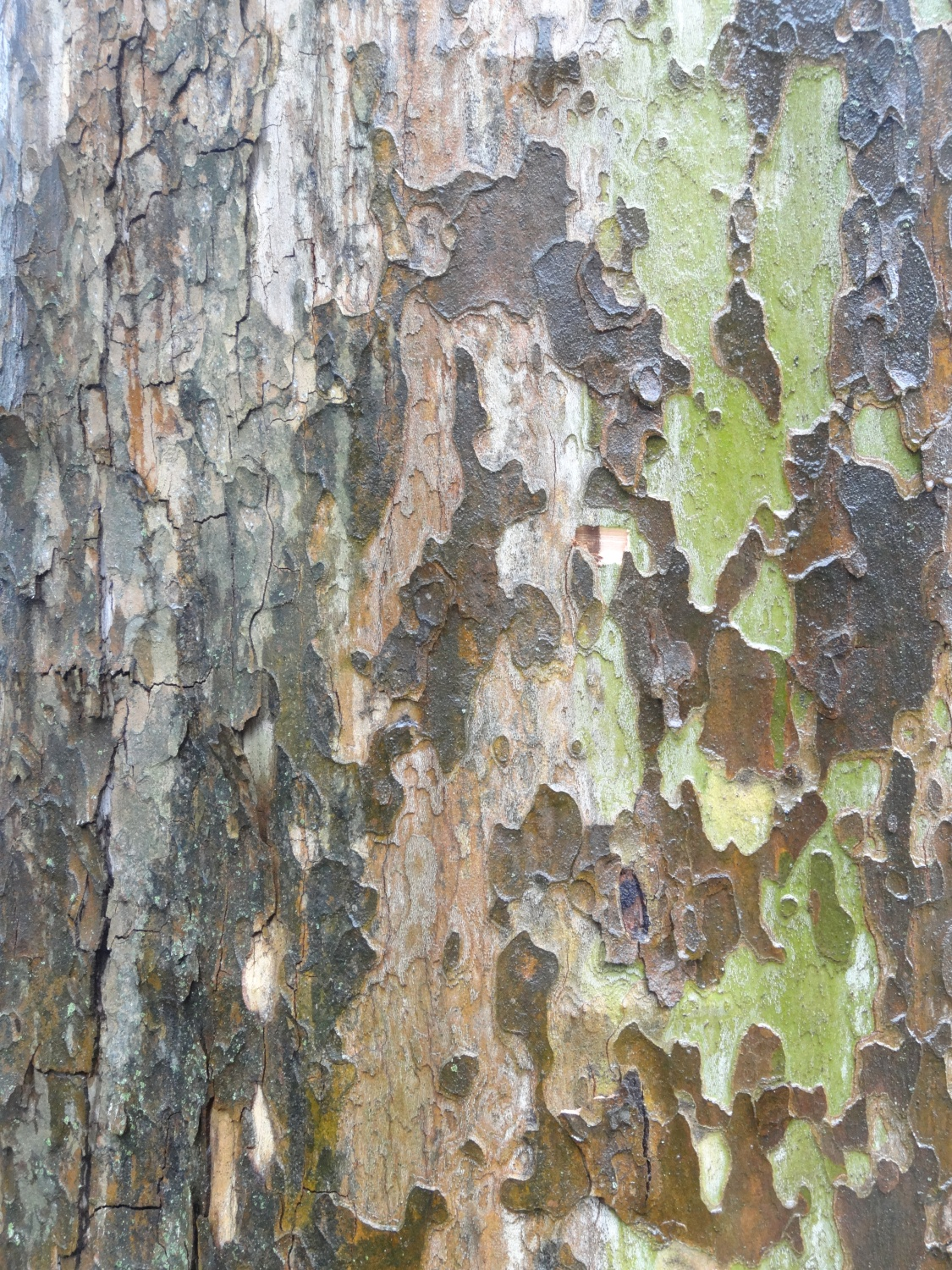
- Canker stain of plane

Scientific classification
- Domain: Eukaryota
- Kingdom: Fungi
- Division: Ascomycota
- Class: Sordariomycetes
- Order: Microascales
- Family: Ceratocystidaceae
- Genus: Ceratocystis
- Species: C. platani

Binomial name
- Ceratocystis platani (J.M.Walter) Engelbr. & T.C.Harr. (2005)

Synonyms
- Endoconidiophora fimbriata f. platani J.M.Walter (1951); Ceratocystis fimbriata f. platani C.May & J.G.Palmer (1959)

= Ceratocystis platani =

Species of fungus

Ceratocystis platani is a fungus that causes a disease on plane trees in the genus Platanus, mostly in North America and Southern Europe.

== Description ==
Ceratocystis platani is believed to be native to southeastern USA. The fungus was previously considered to be part of the Ceratocystis fimbriata species complex as Ceratocystis fimbriata f. platani. It was elevated to the level of species in 2005.

== Canker stain ==
Ceratocystis platani causes a disease in plane trees known as "Canker stain of plane" (UK English) or "Canker of sycamore" (US English).

The disease is caused by the phytotoxin cerato-platanin, which occurs in the cell wall of C. platani, as well as other Dikarya, and is involved in molecular fungus-host interactions.

Oriental plane (Platanus orientalis) is considered highly susceptible to the fungus; American sycamore (Platanus occidentalis) probably coevolved with the fungus and is relatively resistant, while the hybrid London plane (Platanus × hispanica) is generally intermediate in resistance between its parents. The fungus is a wound parasite which rapidly infects plane trees, causing disruption of water movement, cankers and eventually death. Cankers on the tree trunk are characterised by necrosis of inner bark and bluish-black to reddish-brown discolouration of sapwood. The disease can cause sudden death of a portion of the crown, and trees of 30–40 cm diameter may die within 2–3 years of infection.

=== North America ===
The disease was first reported in the USA in 1935 affecting Platanus × hispanica. In subsequent years the disease was reported in most Atlantic seaboard states. It was subsequently observed in plantations and in natural forests of Platanus occidentalis. The disease has also been reported in California. In Philadelphia the disease had killed 10,000 out of a total 150,000 trees by 1945. In Gloucester, New Jersey, 87% of London planes had died by 1949.

=== Europe and the Near East ===
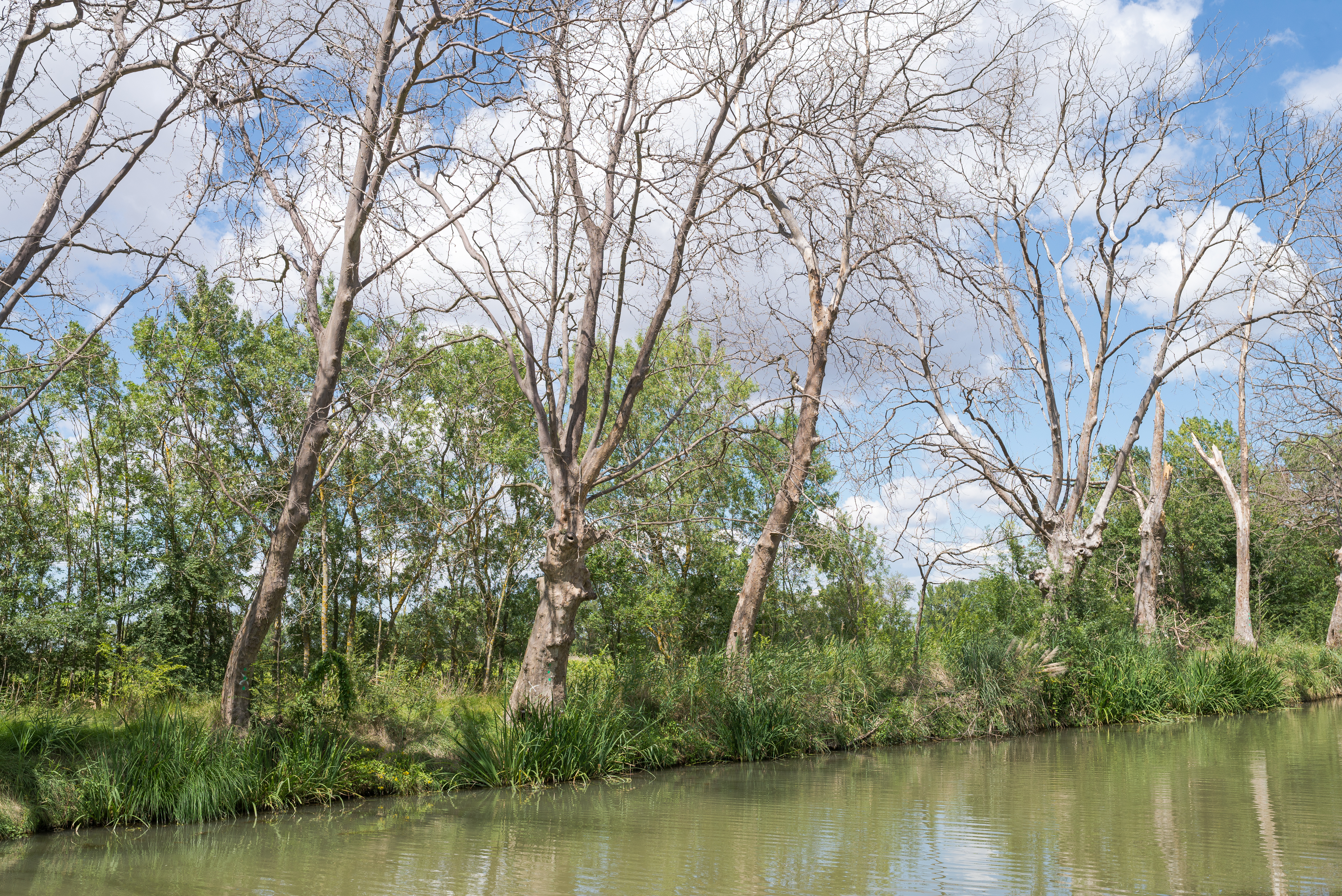
Affected trees in Agde, Southern France (2014)

The disease was first found in Europe in Marseille, France, in 1945, and is believed to have been transported there by US troops during Operation Dragoon towards the end of World War II. The pathogen is now present in most of Italy. It has also been reported in Spain, Switzerland, Greece, Iran, and Armenia. In Italy and the south-east of France the disease has caused serious losses. In Marseille, where the first phase of infection started in 1945, 1850 Plane trees were killed between 1960 and 1972 (about 13% of the initial population). At Forte dei Marmi, one of the oldest infection centres in Italy, 90% of all plane trees died of the disease in the twenty-year period from 1972-1991.

Ceratocystis platani was first detected in Greece in 2003. Since then, hundreds of dead and dying trees have been found along streams and rivers in southwestern Greece, and many ornamental trees have died in residential and recreational areas.

In 2006 C. platani was identified as the cause of plane tree death along the Canal du Midi, a UNESCO world heritage site in France. The canal is lined with around 42,000 plane trees and up to 2011, around 2,500 trees had been felled, destroyed and replaced with disease-resistant planes.
