= Ceratocystis adiposa =

Scientific classification
- Kingdom: Fungi
- Division: Ascomycota
- Class: Sordariomycetes
- Order: Microascales
- Family: Ceratocystidaceae
- Genus: Ceratocystis
- Species: C. adiposa

Binomial name
- Ceratocystis adiposa (E.J.Butler) C.Moreau (1952)

Synonyms
- Ceratocystis major (T.H.Beyma) C.Moreau (1952); Ceratostomella adiposa (E.J.Butler) Sartoris (1927); Ceratostomella major T.H.Beyma (1935); Endoconidiophora adiposa (E.J.Butler) R.W.Davidson (1935); Ophiostoma adiposum (E.J.Butler) Nannf. (1934); Ophiostoma majus (T.H.Beyma) Goid. (1935); Sphaeronaema adiposum E.J.Butler (1906)

Species of fungus

Ceratocystis adiposa is a species of fungus in the family Ceratocystidaceae. It is a plant pathogen, known to cause root rot in sugar cane.
