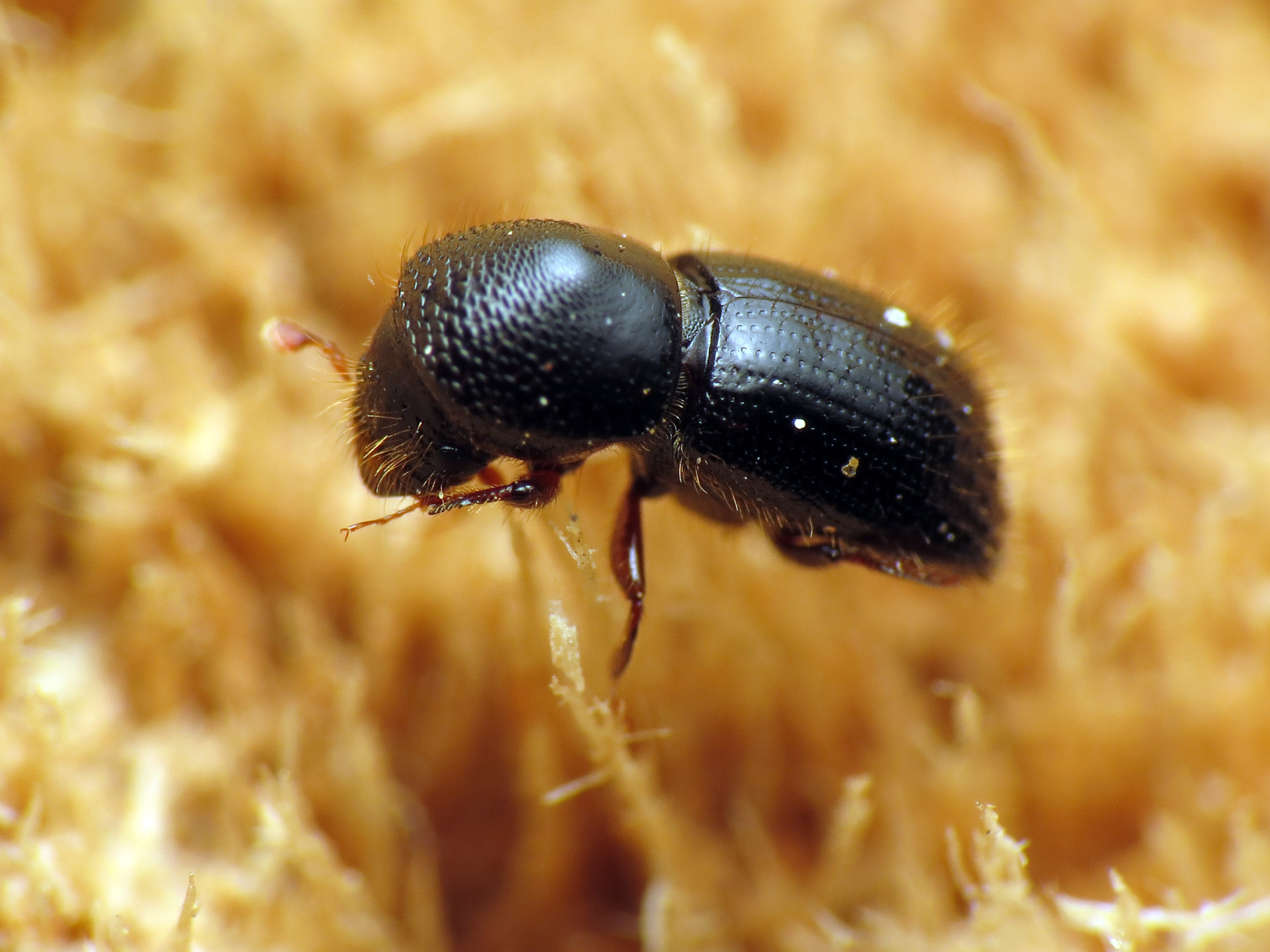

Scientific classification
- Kingdom: Animalia
- Phylum: Arthropoda
- Clade: Pancrustacea
- Class: Insecta
- Order: Coleoptera
- Suborder: Polyphaga
- Infraorder: Cucujiformia
- Superfamily: Curculionoidea
- Family: Curculionidae
- Genus: Xylosandrus
- Species: X. germanus

Binomial name
- Xylosandrus germanus (Blandford, 1894)

= Xylosandrus germanus =

Species of beetle

Xylosandrus germanus, known generally as the alnus ambrosia beetle, black timber bark beetle or black stem borer, is a species of ambrosia beetle in the family Curculionidae. X. germanus poses challenges in woody ornamental species and orchard crops such as apples and pecan. Furthermore, X. germanus is recognized or suspected to act as a vector for plant pathogens to varying extents, potentially leading to the decline of trees. The black stem borer is native to eastern Asia, but spreads as an invasive species in Europe and North America. This species carries and feeds on associated ambrosia fungus, Ambrosiella grosmanniae.

== Description and morphology ==
Xylosandrus germanus are tiny insects, where females measure up to 2 millimeters. The adult female is typically 2.3 times as long as wide. On the other hand, males are rarely found outside of the gallery system. The flightless X. germanus males are typically smaller than females and do not possess mycetangia to transport fungi. Males measure only approximately 1.3 – 1.8 millimeters long, twice as wide as long.

The eggs of X. germanus are white, translucent, shiny, ellipsoidal, and measure up to about 0.67 mm long and 0.38 mm wide.

== Distribution and habitat ==
In contrast to other species within the Xyleborini tribe, such as Xylosandrus and related genera, X. germanus is found outside of the tropical zone. The distribution is limited to temperate climates, including both its native habitats and regions where it has been introduced. Emergence expected after and within 6 days of full bloom on Cornelian cherry dogwood, and usually after and within 4 days of first bloom on Norway maple and full bloom on border forsythia. First emergence in spring may coincide with 75 growing degree days (base 50F).

Field research conducted in Slovakia suggests that cold winter temperature dips (-15 to -30C) have little impact on the persistence of X. germanus.

== Diet and behavior ==
Xylosandrus germanus targets an extensive range of host plants, including both deciduous and coniferous trees. X. germanus does not exhibit strong size selectivity, and it will reproduce in both small branches and large logs and stumps, with a potential preference for stems under 10 cm in diameter. However, it will attack any suitable woody plant stem. Because of the great range of host trees and differences across geographical regions, it is difficult to differentiate between 'primary host' and 'secondary host' trees. It can be anticipated that nearly any crop, plantation, or ornamental tree within a specific area is susceptible to attacks.

The females excavate galleries consisting of entrance tunnels, brood chambers containing eggs and immature beetles, and branch tunnels where the young develop. These galleries are commonly found at the base of the trunk and can house dozens of beetles. This arrangement accommodates all life stages and developmental processes in the insect's life cycle. The larvae go through three instars, and the complete development from the egg to the adult stage takes approximately 30 days.

These insects are known for boring into trees, especially those that are under distress. Trees provide protection for the beetle which ensures the progression of their life cycle. Throughout the winter months, beetles accumulate in tree trunk galleries for protection. Once the winter months pass, adults leave their galleries in search of new tree hosts. The beetle's search is guided by the presence of ethanol, which is synthesized in larger quantities by dead or distressed woody material. Ethanol is a more attractive semiochemical than emitted stress volatiles acetaldehyde, acetone, or methanol . Verbenone as a repellent may show some effect. Most beetle aggregation attractive may be volatile organic compounds (MVOCs) released by the fungi Ambrosiella grosmanniae in already infected woody material. Albeit, there appears to be no scientific consensus yet.

=== Social behavior ===
Xylosandrus germanus foundresses seem to have an initial brief period as they wait for the symbiotic fungus to establish. Once this occurs, oviposition starts, and their activity increases. Initially, Xylosandrus germanus foundresses engage in constructing the gallery and tending the fungal gardens and brood. Later in their lives, they transition to focusing mainly on blocking the gallery entrance. Blocking is deemed crucial for safeguarding broods from natural enemies and preventing the premature (and fatal) exit of larvae from the galleries.

The social structure of X. germanus seems to involve a transition for the foundress from an initial emphasis on constructing the gallery, maintaining fungal gardens, and directly caring for the brood, to an indirect form of brood care through blocking the gallery and expelling frass. The offspring engage in hygiene-promoting behaviors. The frequency of these behaviors may vary depending on the life stage and the age of the gallery.

=== Symbiotic relationships ===
Research has tested that X. germanus takes advantage of the microbial volatile organic compounds (MVOCs) emitted by fungi in host selection. X. germanus was shown to have a strong preference for branch sections that are either pre-colonized by Biological specificity or pre-inoculated with A. grosmanniae, their fungal mutualist. Besides, X. germanus was reported to be able to distinguish between volatiles emitted by various associated fungi, directing its selection based on different combinations of odorous sources. The research speculates that during tree infestation by X. germanus females, the generated or elicited MVOCs can be detected by other host-seeking females. These females, recognizing suitable woody tissues, may consequently opt to colonize the same host site, excavating their galleries and forming aggregations. In this scenario, ethanol might serve as a long-range attractant for dispersing X. germanus females (i.e., those in flight), who could then utilize specific MVOCs for short-range orientation on the bolts. However, from an evolutionary perspective, it's still unclear why MVOCs of fungal symbionts are used as cues for aggregation in beetles colonizing dead wood because bark beetles, in general, are known to be highly susceptible to intraspecific competition. Therefore, in theory, beetles would be expected to avoid breeding near others.

Ambrosia beetles engage in fungal symbiosis with genera Ambrosiella and Raffaelea. Beetles carry fungi into established galleries. The transport of the fungus is achieved through the mycangia of females, a carrying structure. X. germanus specifically engages in symbiosis with Ambrosiella grosmanniae. The insect provides adequate substrate inside their galleries for fungal growth, while the mycelia of the fungus provides nutrition for the insect. Researchers have noticed that X. germanus solely appears to lay eggs succeeding the establishment of A. grosmanniae. This understanding may have important implications for how this species may be managed as a pest.

== Life cycle ==
The beetles have two to three generations per year in the United States, while they have one to two in Europe and Japan. Each female lays 2 to 54 eggs in the United States while producing 12 to 20 progenies in Germany. It was observed that by August 1, many of the galleries in the United States were either empty or contained a dead female, presumably a parent, in the gallery entryway. Adults overwinter often by clustering in galleries at the bases of trees.

=== Sex and reproduction ===
Female Xylosandrus germanus relies on the detection of stress-induced volatiles emitted by a stressed tree hosts. Volatile ethanol being a key factor in locating appropriate hosts. Xylosandrus germanus females lay eggs in the protective galleries of host plants, and many plants serve as viable media for these insects to lay their eggs. Common sawdust types that enable X. germanus reproduction include pear, oak, white ash, European buckthorn, and red maple. Research suggests that offspring of this species hatch in a female-biased ratio, where the ratio can be influenced by the type of host species. The reproductive strategy of X. germanus follows a pattern of arrhenotoky, where only male offspring form from unfertilized eggs, and females or males can form from fertilized eggs. Given that females typically outsize males, X. germanus are also sexually dimorphic. Additionally, because of the close-quartered gallery space, inbreeding is common for this species. In fact, mating between siblings inside the maternal galleries is predominant. Xylosandrus germanus larvae spend most of their time either eating food or being inactive. Additionally, the larvae exhibit various hygienic behaviors that presumably contribute to the maintenance of gallery health. Cleaning activities are common among larvae of many bark and ambrosia beetle species. Unless inactive, X. germanus larvae consistently use their mandibles to chew on various surfaces, including the fungal growth lining the gallery walls and their nest mates. Importantly, the larvae of X. germanus does not expand the gallery through their feeding activities.

== Relationship with Humans - Wood pest ==
Xylosandrus germanus adults infest live trees that are under physiological stress, including those not exhibiting apparent symptoms. They utilize the trunks as locations for galleries, where they establish colonies and rear their brood. The adult female uses its mouthparts to tunnel into the heartwood and create galleries. The tree tissue, instead of being consumed as food, is expelled from the tunnel. This expelled material forms a column of compressed sawdust, resembling a toothpick that projects from the trunk. The beetle's attacks lead to the failure of the tree's conductive tissues, resulting in symptoms such as dieback, yellowed foliage, incomplete maturation of the fruit, and frequently, the death of the tree.

=== Invasive Spread ===
While males are flightless, females can disperse by flight over relatively long distances (at least 2 km). A few beetles can travel even further, especially when caught by wind currents. In the US, X. germanus is spreading at a speed of several tens of kilometers per year. Human transport of infested wood is a cause of the long-distance spread.

The introduction of a small number of female individuals could establish an active population if suitable host plants are available and environmental conditions are favorable. This is because sib-mating takes place in the gallery system before the emergence of the new generation of mated females.

The black timber bark beetle Xylosandrus germanus is native to East Asia. It was first recorded in 1952 in Germany. In the last two decades of the 20th century, the species was also recorded in Austria, Belgium, France, Italy, Poland, and Switzerland. After the year 2000, X. germanus spread throughout Europe and is now present in Croatia, the Czech Republic, Denmark, Hungary, the Netherlands, Romania, the Russian Federation, Slovakia, Slovenia, Spain, Sweden, Turkey, the United Kingdom, and Ukraine.

Economic damage was initially documented in 2016 when a significant quantity of timber, not removed from the forest immediately after logging, was infested by X. germanus. In North America, where it was introduced in 1932, X. germanus is recognized as one of the most economically significant pests in nurseries. In Europe, it is generally viewed as a secondary pest. Nevertheless, in certain European regions, X. germanus has emerged as one of the prevalent scolytid species and is acknowledged for its potential impact on native scolytid communities.

This species is highly polyphagous - the habit of eating and tolerating a relatively wide variety of foods - with a host ranging over 200 plant species in 52 families. While it exhibits a preference for deciduous broadleaf trees and shrubs, it also attacks some conifers. In some introduced areas, such as the US and Europe, its host range includes various plant species, including but not limited to Quercus, Fagus, Acer, Alnus, Betula, Buxus, Carpinus, Corylus, Juglans, Robinia, Ulmus, Picea, Pinus, Abies,Vitaceae, etc.

Many studies based in North America and Europe have declared the invasiveness of Xylosandrus germanus.

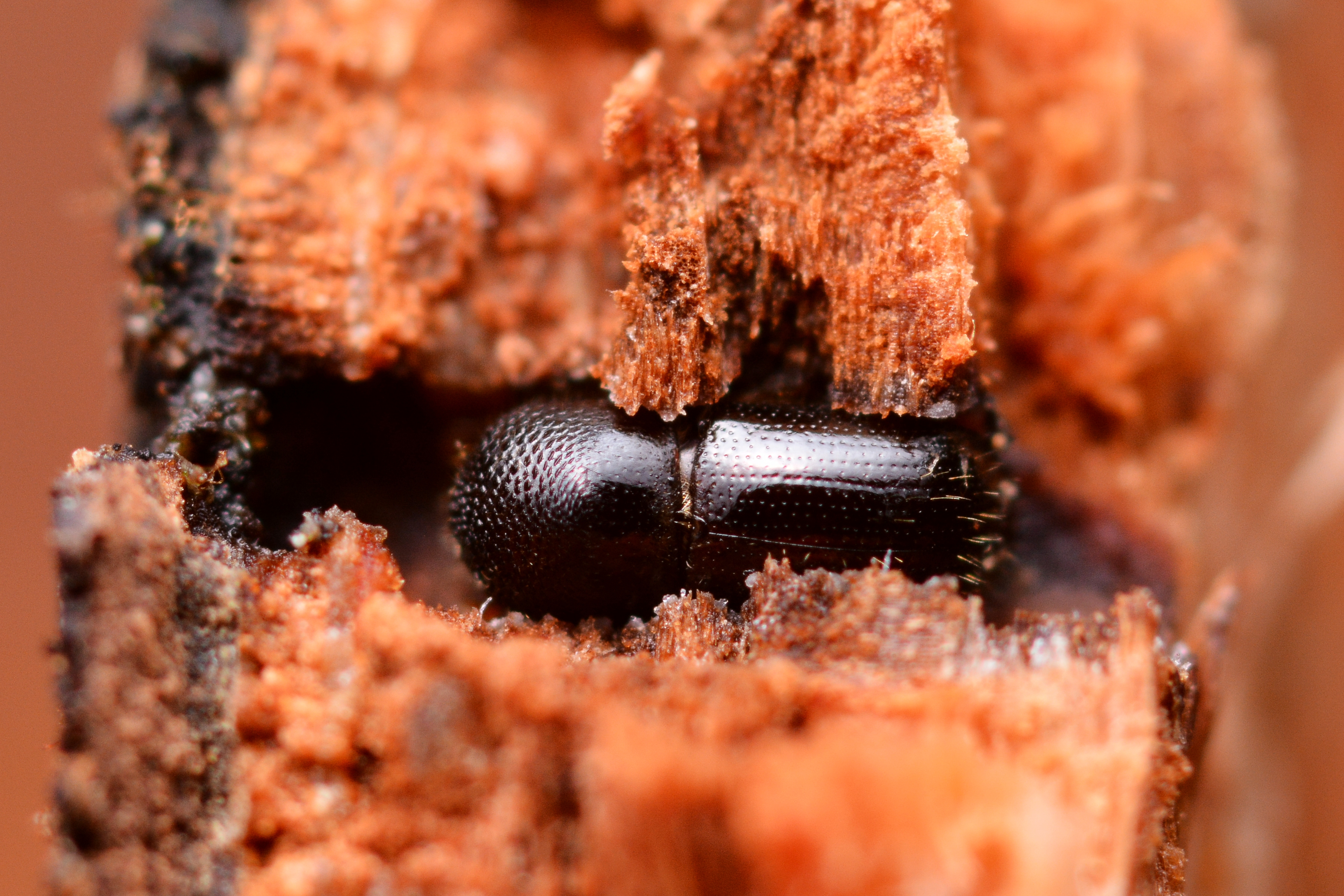
Alnus ambrosia beetle, Xylosandrus germanus

==== European forests ====
Evidence for the invasion of X. germanus has been noted in Austria, the Czech Republic, Germany, Slovakia, Slovenia, and other countries in Europe.

It is believed that X. germanus initially entered Europe through the transport of wood from Japan to Germany in the middle of the twentieth century. Researchers now theorize that climate change and the global transport of lumber continues to bring X. germanus into new environments. The presence of X. germanus is generally inferred using ethanol traps, where the number of individuals trapped can be used to estimate species abundance. The invasion of X. germanus in Europe is detrimental to the logging industry, as downed trees inhabited by the pest lose value, or are rendered unsellable.

Additionally, as in some European countries, monitoring programs utilizing ethanol-baited traps indicate that X. germanus has become a predominant ambrosia beetle species, regardless of the forest type. The discovery of the species at higher altitudes suggests the vertical expansion of the species in Europe, likely influenced by climate change.

==== Slovakia ====
Researchers have data from their experiment conducted in western Slovakia spanning from 2010 to 2012 (Forest District Prievidza, Duchonka locality, 48°40´S, 18°05´V). In oak stands with an average age of 60–80 years, they deployed Lindgren funnel traps equipped with ethanol Ultra High Release (UHR) gelled lures, each weighing approximately 120 grams. Various studies affirm the high attractiveness of ethanol-based lures to ambrosia beetles, including X. germanus. In 2010, they captured 19 X. germanus imagoes, followed by 40 imagoes in 2011 and 77 imagoes in 2012, for a total of 136 imagoes over the three-year period. The results suggest that the observed increase in its occurrence during the study is likely not a random phenomenon. Based on existing literature and studies, researchers infer that the first instance of X. germanus in Slovakia was in 2010 during the experiment. However, researchers believe this species might have been present in the forests several years before first detection.

==== New York apple orchards ====
Xylosandrus germanus invasions of New York apple orchards are detrimental to tree growth and health. Word of the damage reported in New York has also spread to Canada, where the Government of Ontario has warned orchards in the province of the damage caused by ambrosia beetles. Given this invasion, orchards are searching for optimal management strategies to reduce the economic impact of this pest.

=== Pest management ===
The persistence of X. germanus appears to be unimpacted by applying spray insecticides to the trunks of trees. The trialing of insecticides on apple orchards in New York was suggestive of their inconsistency.

Given the ineffective nature, cost, and danger associated with using chemicals for pest management, researchers have begun to search for better ways to manage X. germanus. It was found that fungi in genus Trichoderma could reduce the growth of A. grosmanniae, the symbiont of choice for X. germanus. The hindered growth of A. grosmanniae ultimately causes X. germanus egg production to cease. Utilizing Trichoderma may be an adequate alternative to gain control of X. germanus damage and invasion.
