= Cerato-platanin =

Identifiers
- Symbol: Cerato-platanin
- Pfam: PF07249
- Pfam clan: CL0199
- InterPro: IPR010829
Available protein structures:
- Pfam: structures / ECOD
- PDB: RCSB PDB; PDBe; PDBj
- PDBsum: structure summary

In molecular biology, the cerato-platanin family of proteins includes the phytotoxin cerato-platanin (CP) produced by the Ascomycete Ceratocystis platani. CP homologs are also found in both the Ascomycota and the Basidiomycota branches of Dikarya. This toxin causes the severe plant disease: canker stain. This protein occurs in the cell wall of the fungus and is involved in the host-pathogen interaction and induces both cell necrosis and phytoalexin synthesis which is one of the first plant defense-related events. CP, like other fungal surface proteins, is able to self-assemble in vitro. CP is a 120 amino acid protein, containing 40% hydrophobic residues. It is one of the rare examples of protein in which contains a Hopf link. The link is formed by covalent loops - the pieces of protein backbone closed by two disulphide bonds (formed out of four cysteine residues). The N-terminal region of CP is very similar to cerato-ulmin, a phytotoxic protein produced by the Ophiostoma species belonging to the hydrophobin family, which also self-assembles.
