= Pineapple black rot =

Post-harvest disease of pineapple fruit

Pineapple black rot, also known as butt rot, base rot, or white blister, is a disease caused by Ceratocystis paradoxa (teleomorph) (Thielaviopsis paradoxa: anamorph). C. paradoxa also causes disease in a variety of other tropical plants such as banana, coconut, and sugarcane making it a somewhat dangerous pathogen. Pineapple black rot is the most common and well-known post-harvest disease of the pineapple fruit and is responsible for serious losses in the fresh pineapple fruit world industry. The pathogen is a polyphagous wound parasite and gains entry into the fruit via wounds sustained during and after harvest. The disease only shows up in fresh fruit because the time from harvest to processing it too short for infection occur. Infection can also occur out in the field, but it is not nearly as common as post-harvest infection.

== Hosts & symptoms ==
Fruit that is bruised and/or damage and is kept in unsanitary and high humidity conditions are especially susceptible to this disease. Once infected, the fruit begins to form brown/black lesions. Over time, the lesions become soft, water rot spots making the fruit unappetizing and inedible. In extreme cases, the rot can be so severe that the skin, flesh and core of the fruit breaks down completely and proceeds to leak of out the shell surrounding once healthy fruit. When infection occurs out in the field, brown lesions can develop in wet weather where leaves rub together in the wind. In dry weather, white, paper spots with margins develop. Plants are usually stunted, produce an unusual foul odor, show a soft base rot of the stem and young leaves, and drop their fruit prematurely.

== Disease cycle ==
C. paradoxa survives as chlamydospores and infects through wounds or spaces in between individual fruits. Chlamydospores are specialized conidia produced specifically for survival by the asexual, or anamorph, stage of the pathogen. The chlamydospores eventually give rise to mycelium, or a network of hyphae, which then lead to further sporulation and infection of pineapple fruit. In fields where pineapple black rot is present, chlamydospores are found in the soil and plant debris of previously infected plants. Pieces of pineapple are planted the following growing season to grow new pineapple. The pieces of pineapple fruit farmers use, however, may contain chlamydospores and, therefore, transmit the disease to the next generation of plants.

== Environment ==
Pineapples are grown all around the world and, as a result, pineapple black rot is a widespread disease. They are grown mainly in Asia, Africa, North, South and Central America, the Caribbean, and Europe but also in Australia, Fiji, French Polynesia, New Caledonia, Papua New Guinea, Samoa, Solomon Islands, and Vanuatu. The pathogen thrives in warm/tropical, high humidity environments. Infection is most common when the crowns of the pineapple are detached in wet weather and then stored in heaps, but the disease may not be seen until planting the following growing season.

== Management ==
There are several ways to minimize the effects and transmission of pineapple black rot. If the fruit is already infected, placing it in a hot water bath of a minimum of 50 °C can help minimize the post-harvest symptoms. It is also recommended, if you are storing the infected fruit, to is in a triazole fungicide such as triadimenol and/or propiconazole and maintain refrigeration at 9 °C which limits the sporulation of conidia. When packing up the fruit and getting ready for transportation, it is important to maintain strict hygiene to avoid unwanted infection between fruits. When trying to minimize transmission of the disease out in the field, it is recommended to improve soil drainage to avoid excess moisture and, therefore, not to plant during wet weather.

== Importance ==
Annually, pineapple black rot causes a 10% yield loss in India. It also leads to a loss of planting material for the following growing season. French Guiana has C. paradoxa identified as a quarantine pathogen because it can be so detrimental to the pineapple industry in that region.

== Taxonomy ==
Domain: Eukaryota
Kingdom: Fungi
Phylum: Ascomycota
Subphylum: Pezizomycotina
Class: Sordariomycetes
Subclass: Hypocremycetidae
Order: Microascales
Family: Ceratocysidaceae
Genus: Ceratocystis
Species: paradoxa

== See also ==
- Butt rot
