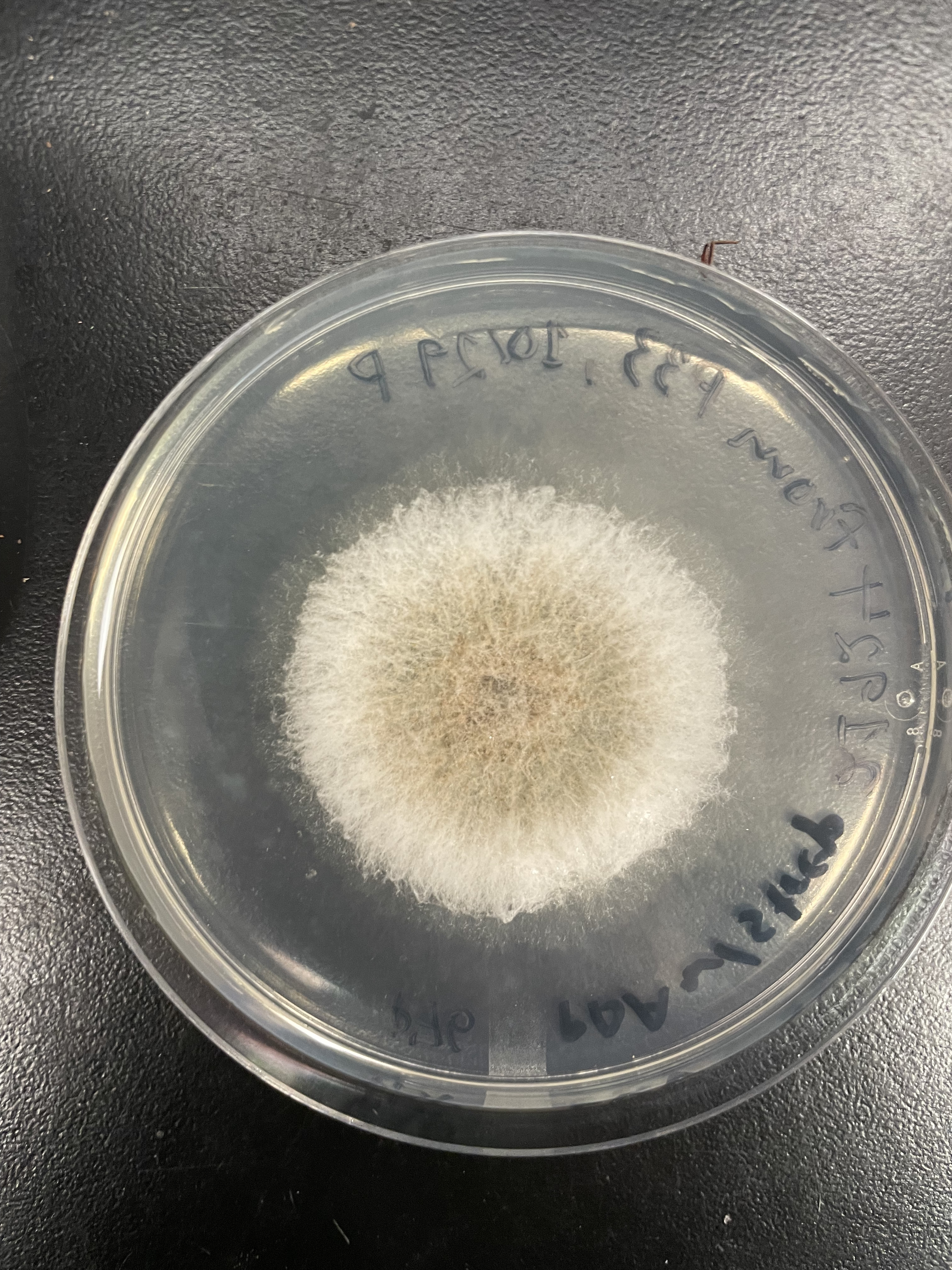
- Ambrosiella roeperi

Scientific classification
- Kingdom: Fungi
- Division: Ascomycota
- Class: Sordariomycetes
- Order: Microascales
- Family: Ceratocystidaceae
- Genus: Ambrosiella; Brader ex Arx & Hennebert 1965

Species
- See text.

= Ambrosiella =

Genus of fungi

Ambrosiella is a genus of ambrosia fungi within the family Ceratocystidaceae. It was circumscribed by mycologists Josef Adolph von Arx and Grégoire L. Hennebert in 1965 with Ambrosiella xylebori designated as the type species. All Ambrosiella species are obligate symbionts of ambrosia beetles. Several former species were moved to genera Raffaelea, Hyalorhinocladiella, or Phialophoropsis, and there were nine species recognized 2017. Twelve species in as of 2023. One species, Ambrosiella cleistominuta, has been observed to produce a fertile sexual state with cleistothecious ascomata.

== Species ==
As accepted by Species Fungorum;

- Ambrosiella batrae C. Mayers, McNew & T.C. Harr. (2015)
- Ambrosiella beaveri Six, Z.W. de Beer & W.D. Stone (2009)
- Ambrosiella catenulata Y.T. Lin & H.H. Shih (2017)
- Ambrosiella cleistominuta C. Mayers & T.C. Harr. (2017)
- Ambrosiella grosmanniae C. Mayers, McNew & T.C. Harr. (2015)
- Ambrosiella hartigii L.R. Batra (1968)
- Ambrosiella nakashimae C. Mayers, McNew & T.C. Harr. (2015)
- Ambrosiella remansi C. Mayers & T.C. Harr. (2019)
- Ambrosiella roeperi T.C. Harr. & McNew (2014)
- Ambrosiella sulcati A. Funk (1970)
- Ambrosiella trypodendri (L.R. Batra) T.C. Harr. (2010)
- Ambrosiella xylebori Brader ex Arx & Hennebert (1965)

Former species;

- A. brunnea L.R. Batra (1968) = Raffaelea brunnea, Ophiostomataceae
- A. ferruginea L.R. Batra (1968) = Phialophoropsis ferruginea, Ceratocystidaceae
- A. gnathotrichi L.R. Batra (1968) = Raffaelea gnathotrichi, Ophiostomataceae
- A. ips (J.G. Leach, L.W. Orr & C.M. Chr.) L.R. Batra (1968) = Hyalorhinocladiella ips, Ophiostomataceae
- A. macrospora (Francke-Grosm.) L.R. Batra (1968) = Ophiostoma macrosporum, Ceratocystidaceae
- A. sulphurea L.R. Batra (1968) = Raffaelea sulphurea, Ophiostomataceae
- A. tingens (Lagerb. & Melin) L.R. Batra (1968) = Ophiostoma tingens, Ceratocystidaceae
