= Rapid ʻŌhiʻa Death =

Fungal disease

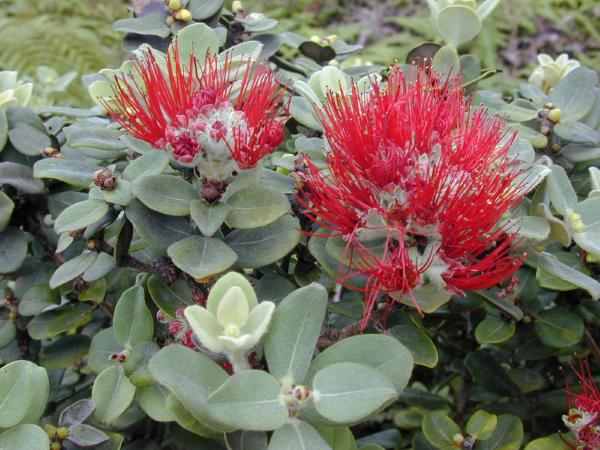
ʻŌhiʻa Lehua flowers

Rapid ʻŌhiʻa Death (ROD) is a fungal disease that is rapidly killing forests of ʻōhiʻa (Metrosideros polymorpha)—an ecologically important native tree species within the Hawaiian Islands that has provided a plethora of habitats for endangered birds and other species. Initially reported in 2010 by landowners in Puna, one of nine districts on the Island of Hawaiʻi, ROD spread quickly across tens of thousands of acres of ʻŌhiʻa trees on the Hawaiian Islands. To date, hundreds of thousands of these trees have died from this fungal disease alone. Previously healthy Ōhiʻa trees have been observed to die within a few days to weeks, which is why the disease is known as "Rapid Ōhiʻa Death."

In April 2018, the cause of Rapid ʻŌhiʻa Death was identified as two fungal species within the genus Ceratocystis that were previously unknown to science: Ceratocystis huliohia and Ceratocystis lukuohia. By May 2018, infected ʻōhiʻa trees were found on the island of Kauai, prompting requests that members of the public limit transportation of ʻōhiʻa products within the island. The less aggressive of the two fungus species, C. huliohia, has been confirmed on Hawaii Island, Kauai, Maui, and Oahu. According to experts, the fungus is likely to have been carried between the islands on the shoes or hiking boots of tourists, but it can also be transmitted by dirty tools, animals or via the wind. Currently, there is no cure for infected ʻŌhiʻa trees. Ways to prevent the disease from spreading is through avoiding the transmission of any parts of the tree to other ʻŌhiʻa's, such as by removing soil debris from shoes, other gear, and tools. In order to fight back against the spread of this disease and to educate citizens on what the disease is, scientists and government officials have created a "ROD Strategic Response Plan," which outlines topics such as what the disease is, how it spreads, and how to prevent it from spreading.

A 2019 documentary titled Saving ʻŌhiʻa: Hawaii's Sacred Tree, produced by Club Sullivan and funded by a grant from the Hawaii Invasive Species Council, provided an in-depth look into the cultural and ecological importance of ʻōhiʻa and the environmental and cultural impacts of the ROD epidemic. The film was nominated for six Emmys and received three awards from the National Academy of Television Arts and Sciences Pacific Southwest Chapter.

== Types of ROD pathogens ==
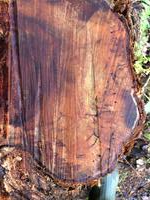
Boring beetle tunnels in Ohia tree stump. Researchers are studying if boring beetle excrement is a pathway for ROD pathogens to spread to the Ohia trees.

Ceratocystis huliohia: This fungal pathogen was confirmed by plant pathologist Lisa Keith and her lab team in 2014. Keith and her team asked local Hawaiians for advice before choosing the name Ceratocystis huliohia for the fungal organism. "Huliohia" means that it changes the natural state of ʻŌhiʻa). This fungal pathogen has been found to create a canker disease beneath the bark that slowly spreads throughout the water-conducting tissue within the tree, leading to wilting leaves, dried out branches and ultimately, the death of the tree. In both ROD fungal pathogens, signs of the disease have been shown in the outer ring of the cut trunk. Additionally, scientists have found through systematic dissections of the tree that the darkest portion of the bark is where the fungus has entered, and that predominantly the fungus has been found that the disease grows quicker up the stem of the tree than down it. Researchers have also been studying how the excrement created by boring beetles within the ʻŌhiʻa trees can be used as a pathway for both pathogens of ROD.

Ceratocystis lukuohia: This fungal pathogen is named the destroyer of ʻōhiʻa because unlike Ceratocystis huliohia, it spreads quickly throughout the tree and causes a systemic wilt. This pathogen also chokes the tissue in the tree, which prevents it from acquiring water, and the pathogen spreads much quicker than the C. huliohia pathogen, leading to the entire crown of the tree wilting and eventually dying.

== Policies and Plans ==
In 2020, the Rapid ʻŌhiʻa Death Working Group released a "Strategic Response Plan for 2020-2024" laying out management, research, and public engagement priorities to contain the disease and calling for $4 million a year in funding over the next five years to "continue progress toward understanding and addressing the fungal disease that has seriously impacted Hawaii's native forests." Within the response plan, researchers have developed a rapid molecular test that identifies the presence of the Ceratocystis pathogens within ʻŌhiʻa trees. Researchers within the response plan have also developed effective sanitation techniques, such as, applying heat and vacuum-steam to infected materials, which have been shown to treat the pathogens. The Strategic Response Plan has also succeeded in cooperating with the Hawai'i Seed Bank Partnership to form an advocacy coalition that has succeeded in training and educated hundreds of volunteers statewide on how to collect ʻŌhiʻa seeds to further conservation of the species. In January 2025, the U.S. Congress introduced a bill that would require the Secretary of the Interior to collaborate with the Secretary of Agriculture and the Hawai'i state government to address the disease.

The bill was voted on in the House on 23 January, 2025, passing with a 359-62 vote. It now heads to the Senate.
