= Huntiella moniliformis =

Scientific classification
- Kingdom: Fungi
- Division: Ascomycota
- Class: Sordariomycetes
- Order: Microascales
- Family: Ceratocystidaceae
- Genus: Huntiella
- Species: H. moniliformis

Binomial name
- Huntiella moniliformis (Hedgc.) Z.W. de Beer, T.A. Duong & M.J. Wingf.

Synonyms
- Ceratocystis moniliformis (Hedgc.) C. Moreau; Ceratocystis moniliformis f. wilsonii (B.K. Bakshi) C. Moreau; Ceratocystis wilsonii B.K. Bakshi [as 'wilsoni']; Ceratostomella moniliformis Hedgc.; Endoconidiophora moniliformis (Hedgc.) R.W. Davidson; Ophiostoma moniliforme (Hedgc.) Syd. & P. Syd.

Species of fungus

Huntiella moniliformis is a saprobic fungal species that was previously accommodated in the Ceratocystis genus. Due to morphological, molecular and ecological differences, it was recently allocated to the newly described Huntiella genus. Species belonging to this genus typically do not cause disease on plants with the exception of H. bhutanensis. These species are almost always found on freshly cut timber or wounded trees.

The MAT locus and sexual strategy of H. moniliformis was recently elucidated. Unlike its close relatives that are heterothallic, H. moniliformis exhibits a homothallic sexual strategy. It harbours only the MAT1-2-1 gene at its MAT locus and is thus an example of a unisexually reproducing species. Such species are able to produce sexual progeny even in the absence of typically essential mating genes.
