= Chalaropsis =

Scientific classification
- Kingdom: Fungi
- Division: Ascomycota
- Class: Sordariomycetes
- Order: Microascales
- Family: Ceratocystidaceae
- Genus: Chalaropsis; Peyronel 1916
- Species: C. populi

Binomial name
- Chalaropsis populi Veldeman 1971

Genus of fungi

Chalaropsis is a monotypic genus of fungi within the Ceratocystidaceae family containing the sole species Chalaropsis populi.
