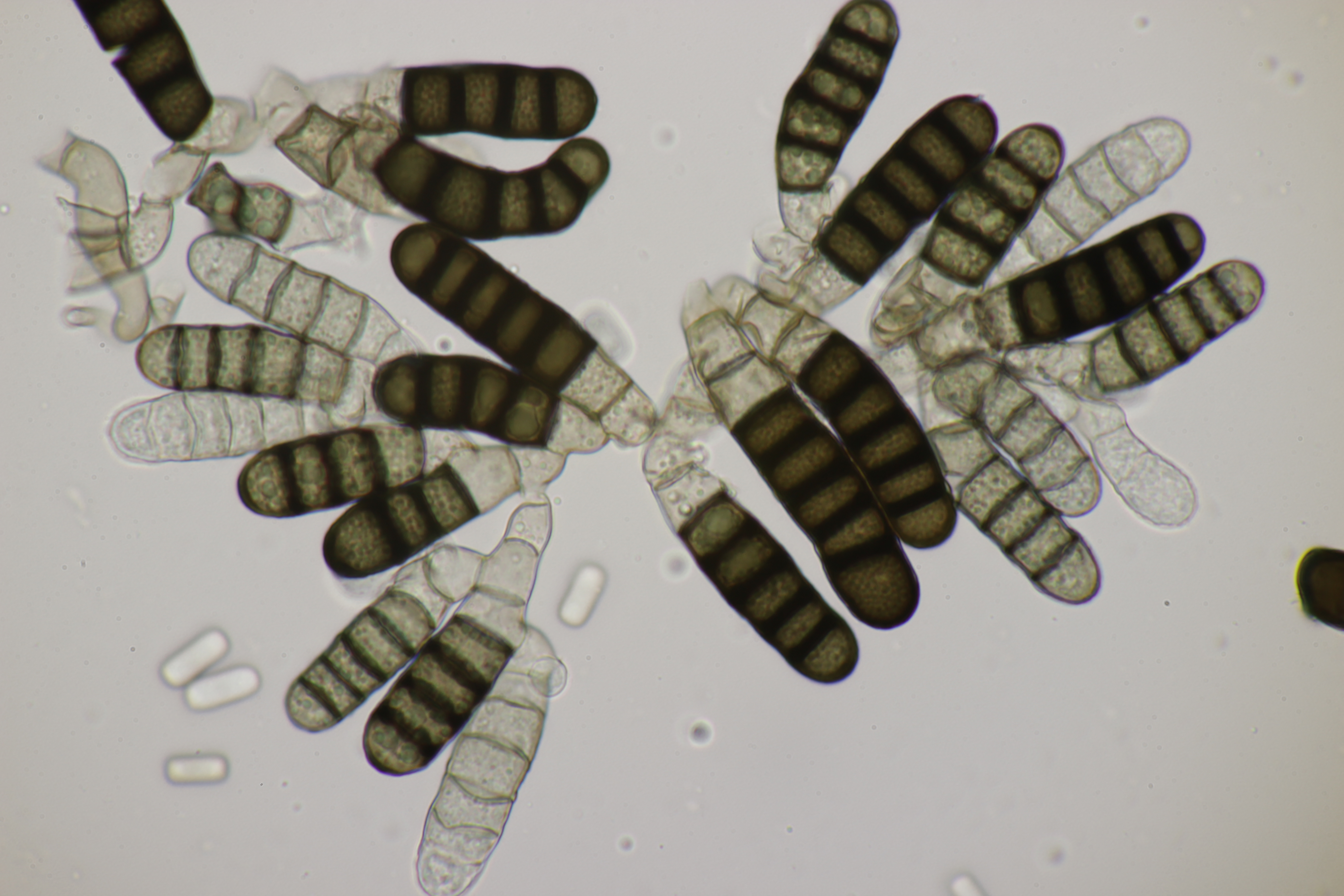
- Microscopic view of Thielaviopsis basicola chlamydospores

Scientific classification
- Domain: Eukaryota
- Kingdom: Fungi
- Division: Ascomycota
- Class: Sordariomycetes
- Order: Microascales
- Family: Ceratocystidaceae
- Genus: Thielaviopsis; Went

= Thielaviopsis =

Genus of fungi

Thielaviopsis is a small genus of fungi in the order Microascales,‍ and family Ceratocystidaceae.‍ The genus includes several important agricultural pathogens. The most widespread is T. basicola, the causal agent in several root rot diseases of economically important crop species including cotton and a variety of vegetables. In cotton, Thielaviopsis causes root rot, also known as black root rot, which causes necrosis of the roots and stunting of the crop plants.

The genus name of Thielavia is in honour of Friedrich Joachim Sigismund von Thielau (1796–1870), who was a German forester and landowner in Breslau.‍

== Species ==
As accepted by Species Fungorum;‍

- Thielaviopsis abuensis Chouhan & Panwar (1981)
- Thielaviopsis cerberus (Mbenoun, M.J. Wingf. & Jol. Roux) Z.W. de Beer, T.A. Duong & M.J. Wingf. (2014)
- Thielaviopsis ethacetica Went (1893)
- Thielaviopsis musarum (R.S. Mitchell) Riedl (1962)
- Thielaviopsis populi (Veldeman ex Kiffer & Delon) A.E. Paulin, T.C. Harr. & McNew (2002)
- Thielaviopsis radicicola (Bliss) Z.W. De Beer & W.C. Allen (2016)
- Thielaviopsis wallemiiformis Dominik & Ihnat. (1975)

Former species;‍ (assume family Ceratocystidaceae if not mentioned)

- T. australis (J. Walker & Kile) A.E. Paulin, T.C. Harr. & McNew (2002) = Davidsoniella australis
- T. basicola (Berk. & Broome) Ferraris (1912) = Berkeleyomyces basicola
- T. eucalypti (Z.Q. Yuan & Kile) A.E. Paulin, T.C. Harr. & McNew (2002) = Davidsoniella eucalypti
- T. euricoi (Bat. & A.F. Vital) A.E. Paulin, T.C. Harr. & McNew (2002) = Ceratocystis euricoi
- T. neocaledoniae Dadant (1950) = Davidsoniella neocaledoniae
- T. neocaledoniae (Dadant ex Kiffer & Delon) A.E. Paulin, T.C. Harr. & McNew (2002) = Davidsoniella neocaledoniae
- T. ovoidea (Nag Raj & W.B. Kendr.) A.E. Paulin, T.C. Harr. & McNew (2002) = Chalaropsis ovoidea
- T. paradoxa (De Seynes) Höhn. (1904) = Ceratocystis paradoxa
- T. paradoxa var. musarum R.S. Mitchell (1937) = Thielaviopsis musarum
- T. punctulata (Hennebert) A.E. Paulin, T.C. Harr. & McNew (2002) = Thielaviopsis radicicola
- T. quercina (B.W. Henry) A.E. Paulin, T.C. Harr. & McNew (2002) = Ceratocystis fagacearum
- T. thielavioides (Peyronel) A.E. Paulin, T.C. Harr. & McNew (2002) = Ceratocystis paradoxa
- T. ungeri (Sacc.) A.E. Paulin, T.C. Harr. & McNew (2002) = Chalara ungeri, Pezizellaceae
