= Ceratocystis paradoxa =

Scientific classification
- Kingdom: Fungi
- Division: Ascomycota
- Class: Sordariomycetes
- Order: Microascales
- Family: Ceratocystidaceae
- Genus: Ceratocystis
- Species: C. paradoxa

Binomial name
- Ceratocystis paradoxa (Dade) C. Moreau, (1952)

Synonyms
- Ceratostomella paradoxa Dade, Trans. (1928); Chalara paradoxa (De Seynes) Sacc., (1892); Chalara thielavioides (Peyronel) Nag Raj & W.B. Kendr., (1975); Chalaropsis thielavioides Peyronel, (1916); Endoconidiophora paradoxa (De Seynes) R.W. Davidson, (1935); Endoconidium fragrans Delacr., (1893); Hughesiella euricoi Bat. & A.F. Vital, (1956); Neocarpenteles acanthosporum (Udagawa & Takada) Udagawa & Uchiy., (2002); Ophiostoma paradoxum (Dade) Nannf., (1934); Sporoschisma paradoxum De Seynes, De la Formation de corps reproducteurs appelés Acrospores 3: 30 (1886); Stilbochalara dimorpha Ferd. & Winge, (1910); Thielaviopsis ethacetica Went [as 'ethaceticus'], (1893); Thielaviopsis euricoi (Bat. & A.F. Vital) A.E. Paulin, T.C. Harr. & McNew, (2002); Thielaviopsis paradoxa (De Seynes) Höhn., (1904); Thielaviopsis thielavioides (Peyr.) A.E. Paulin, T.C. Harr. & McNew, (2002)

Species of fungus

Ceratocystis paradoxa or Black Rot of Pineapple is a plant pathogen that is a fungus, part of the phylum Ascomycota. It is characterized as the teleomorph or sexual reproduction stage of infection. This stage contains ascocarps, or sacs/fruiting bodies, which contain the sexually produced inoculating ascospores. These are the structures which are used primarily to survive long periods of time or overwinter to prepare for the next growing season of its host. Unfortunately, the sexual stage is not often seen in the natural field but instead the anamorph, or asexual stage is more commonly seen. This asexual stage name is Thielaviopsis paradoxa and is the common cause of Black rot or stem-end rot of its hosts.

== Hosts and symptoms ==
One of the most well-known diseases caused by Ceratocystis paradoxa is Black rot or stem-end rot of pineapple, but it can also infect tropical fruit plants such as banana and coconuts as well as sugarcane. The pathogen infects the fruits through wounds or other openings after harvest has already happened and the fruit is fresh.

Symptoms for this disease are very obvious black lesions on the fruit, the main infection part of the plant. If the pathogen infects the plant while fruits are still on it, they will prematurely drop. Other symptoms include discoloration of leaves as well as the seeds. The lesions on the fruit evolve to become soft rot spots that produce a heinous odor. The fruit can even get to the point of breakdown.

Known hosts:

- Ananas comosus (pineapple)
- Araceae
- Areca catechu (betelnut palm)
- Borassus flabellifer (toddy palm)
- Butia capitata
- Cocos nucifera (coconut)
- Coffea (coffee)
- Daucus carota (carrot)
- Dypsis decaryi
- Elaeis guineensis (African oil palm)
- Eucalyptus
- Howea forsteriana (paradise palm)
- Mangifera indica (mango)
- Musa x paradisiaca (plantain)
- Phoenix dactylifera (date-palm)
- Saccharum officinarum (sugarcane)
- Solanum muricatum (melon pear)
- Theobroma cacao (cocoa)
- Zea mays (maize)

== Disease cycle ==
The pathogen Ceratocystis paradoxa is the teleomorph stage of the inoculation and is uncommon in the natural environment. This is because the primary disease observed is caused by the anamorph stage which is due to Thielaviopsis paradoxa. Chlamydospores are the overwinter stage of the pathogen. Because pineapples are grown using pieces of fruit previously harvested pineapples, these chlamydospores can be present and can start the inoculation early on. If they are not present in the planting, then they must infect the wounds or natural openings on harvested pineapple.

When the chlamydospores first infect the plant, they give rise to the mycelium, or hyphae network, which then lead to further spore infection. This gives rise to the black rot that is seen. If the infection is seen out in the field, the chlamydospores will over winter in the dead debris of the plants or in the soil.

== Management ==
If the disease has inoculated the fruit after the harvest has already happened, there are a few ways to limited the spread of the disease. One way is to soak the fruit in hot temperatures. Also, if the fruit is to be stored then it should be at cold temperatures to limit further spore production. It is also helpful to keep the fruit as clean as possible.

If the disease begins in the soil from debris or chlamydospores from past fruit then it is best to change out the soil or to keep it as dry as possible to make sure the conditions are not ideal for the pathogen.

Post-harvest fungicides are also useful in limiting the disease, however continued use could possibly lead to pathogen resistance. The fungicide may also be harmful to the consumers if it is directly sprayed onto the fruit.
