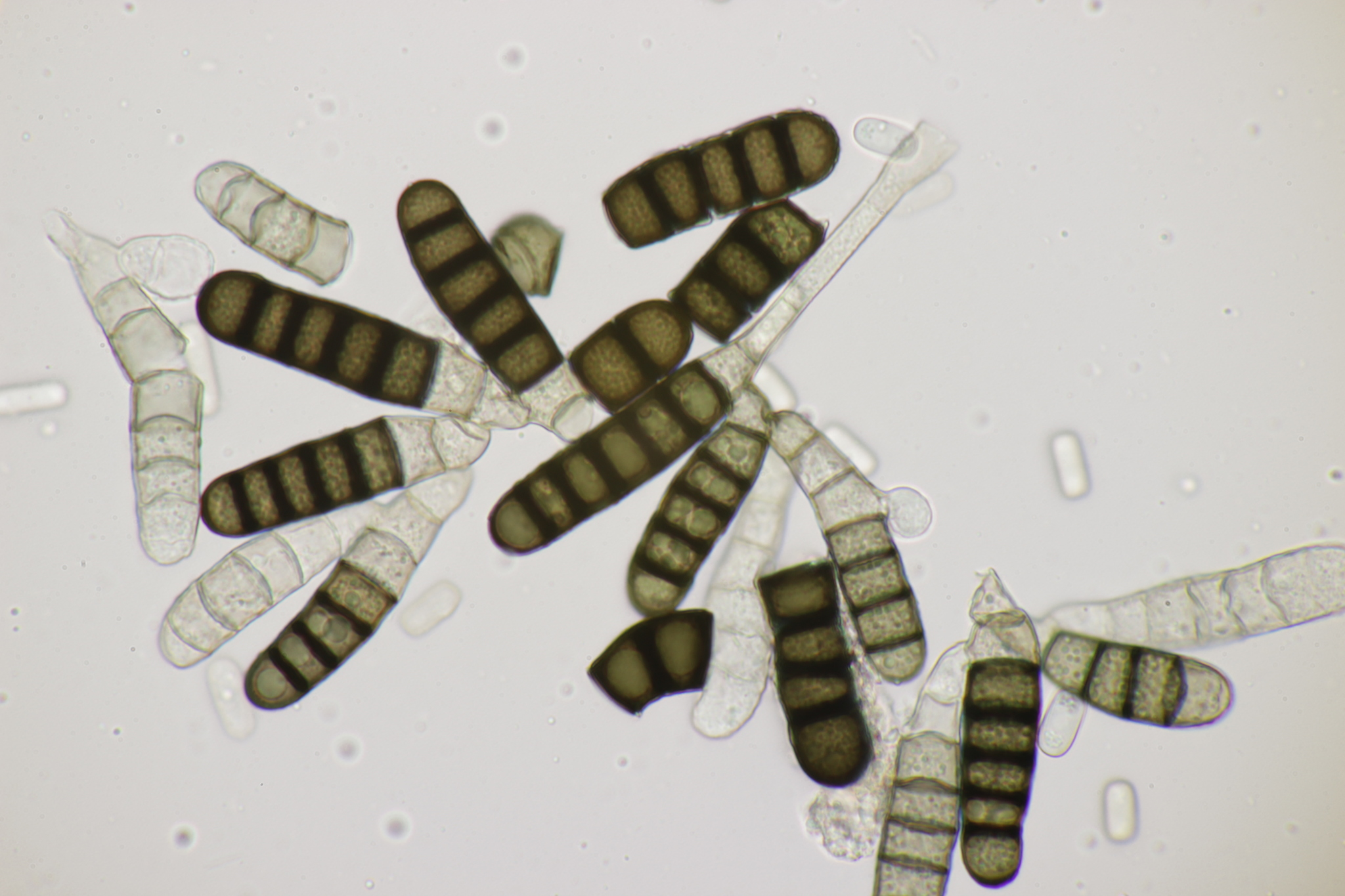
- Thielaviopsis basicola

Scientific classification
- Kingdom: Fungi
- Division: Ascomycota
- Class: Sordariomycetes
- Order: Microascales
- Family: Ceratocystidaceae; Locq. ex Réblová, W. Gams & Seifert 2011

Type genus
- Ceratocystis Ellis & Halst. 1890

= Ceratocystidaceae =

Family of fungi

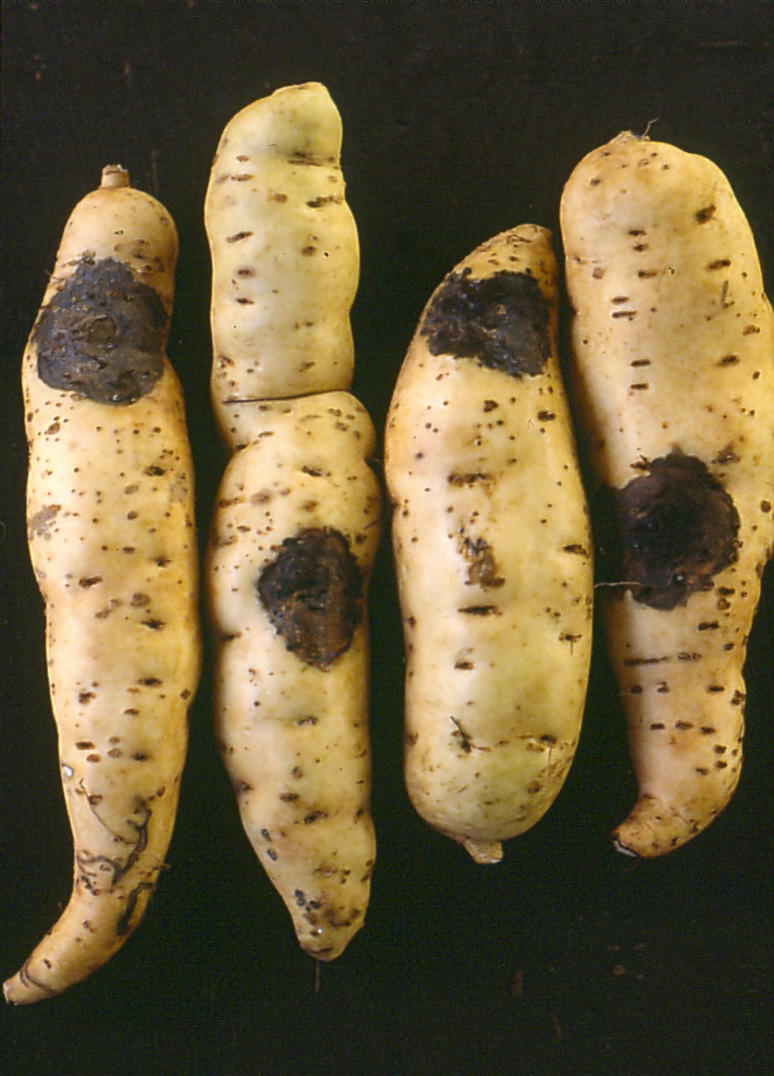
Ceratocystis black rot on sweet potatoes

The Ceratocystidaceae are a family of fungi in the class Sordariomycetes, subclass Hypocreomycetidae.

== Genera ==
As accepted in 2020; (with amount of species)

- Ambrosiella Brader ex Arx & Hennebert (10)
- Berkeleyomyces W.J. Nel, Z.W. de Beer, T.A. Duong & M.J. Wingf. (2)
- Bretziella Z.W. de Beer, Marinc., T.A. Duong & M.J. Wingf. (1)
- Ceratocystis Ellis & Halst. (105)
- Chalaropsis Peyronel (3)
- Davidsoniella Z.W. de Beer, T.A. Duong & M.J. Wingf. (4)
- Endoconidiophora Münch (9)
- Huntiella Z.W. de Beer, T.A. Duong & M.J. Wingf. (29)
- Meredithiella McNew, C. Mayers & T.C. Harr. (3)
- Phialophoropsis L.R. Batra emend. T.C. Harr. (2)
- Thielaviopsis Went. (7)

Previously accepted now Incertae sedis

- Gabarnaudia (2)
