= List of invasive species in North America =

This is a list of invasive species in North America. A species is regarded as invasive if it has been introduced by human action to a location, area, or region where it did not previously occur naturally (i.e., is not a native species), becomes capable of establishing a breeding population in the new location without further intervention by humans, and becomes a pest in the new location, directly threatening human industry, such as agriculture, or the local biodiversity.

The term invasive species refers to a subset of those species defined as introduced species. Suppose a species has been introduced, but remains local, and is not problematic for human industry or the local biodiversity. In that case, it is not considered invasive, and does not belong on this list.

== Plants ==
- Acer platanoides (Norway maple)
- Achillea millefolium (common yarrow; USDA identifies yarrow as native while acknowledging that some nonnative varieties have been introduced)
- Ailanthus altissima (chouchun, tree of heaven)
- Albizia julibrissin (Persian silk tree, mimosa, pink siris)
- Alliaria petiolata (garlic mustard, hedge garlic)
- Allium neapolitanum (Naples garlic)
- Allium vineale (crow garlic)
- Aloe vera
- Alnus glutinosa (black alder)
- Alternanthera philoxeroides (alligatorweed)
- Anthemis cotula (mayweed, stinking chamomile)
- Anthriscus sylvestris (cow parsley, wild chervil, Queen Anne's lace)
- Ardisia crenata (coral bush, coralberry)
- Arum italicum (Italian arum)
- Arundo donax (giant reed, Spanish cane)
- Barbarea verna (land cress)
- Barbarea vulgaris (yellow rocket)
- Bassia scoparia (Mexican fireweed, summer cypress, mock-cypress)
- Begonia cucullata (Wax Begonia)
- Berberis thunbergii (Japanese barberry, Thunberg's barberry)
- Bothriochloa ischaemum (King Ranch bluestem)
- Bromus tectorum (cheatgrass, downy brome, drooping brome)
- Butomus umbellatus (flowering rush, grass rush)
- Cardamine hirsuta (hairy bittercress)
- Carduus nutans (musk thistle, nodding thistle)
- Casuarina equisetifolia (Australian pine, Filao tree)
- Caulerpa taxifolia ("killer algae")
- Celastrus orbiculatus (Oriental bittersweet)
- Celosia argentea (Quail grass)
- Centaurea calcitrapa (purple starthistle)
- Centaurea diffusa (diffuse knapweed, white knapweed)
- Centaurea solstitialis (yellow cockspur, yellow starthistle)
- Centaurea stoebe (spotted knapweed)
- Cinnamomum camphora (camphor laurel, camphor tree)
- Cirsium arvense (Canada thistle)
- Cirsium vulgare (bull thistle)
- Colocasia esculenta (wild taro)
- Commelina communis (Asiatic blue dayflower)
- Conium maculatum (poison hemlock)
- Cortaderia selloana (pampas grass)
- Cosmos sulphureus (sulfur cosmos, yellow Cosmos)
- Cynodon dactylon (Bermuda grass, dog's tooth grass, devil's grass, couch grass)
- Cynoglossum officinale (houndstongue)
- Cytisus scoparius (common broom, Scotch broom)
- Dactylis glomerata (Orchard grass)
- Daucus carota (wild carrot, Queen Anne's lace)
- Dichanthium spp. (Old World bluestems)
- Dioscorea bulbifera (air potato)
- Dipsacus fullonum (common teasel)
- Egeria densa (Brazilian waterweed, large-flowered waterweed)
- Elaeagnus angustifolia (Russian olive, Russian silverberry)
- Elaeagnus umbellata (autumn olive, Japanese silverberry)
- Elymus repens (quackgrass)
- Epipremnum aureum (Golden Pothos)
- Eragrostis lehmanniana (Lehmann's lovegrass)
- Eucalyptus globulus (southern blue gum, Tasmanian blue gum)
- Euonymus alatus (burning bush, winged euonymus)
- Euonymus fortunei (winter creeper vine)
- Euphorbia esula (green spurge, leafy spurge)
- Ficaria verna (lesser celandine)
- Firmiana simplex (Chinese parasol tree)
- Galium aparine (Catchweed bedstraw)
- Glechoma hederacea (ground ivy)
- Hedera helix (common ivy, English ivy)
- Heracleum mantegazzianum (giant cow parsley, giant hogweed)
- Hesperis matronalis (dame's rocket)
- Humulus japonicus (Japanese hop)
- Hydrilla verticillata (Esthwaite waterweed, hydrilla)
- Hypericum perforatum (St. Johnswort)
- Hypochaeris glabra (Smooth Cat's Ear)
- Imperata cylindrica (cogon, cogongrass)
- Ipomoea aquatica (water spinach)
- Kali tragus (tumbleweed, Russian thistle, windwitch, common saltwort, salsola)
- Lagarosiphon major (oxygen weed)
- Lepidium appelianum (hairy whitetop, globepodded hoarycress)
- Lepidium draba (whitetop, hoary cress)
- Ligustrum japonicum (Japanese privet)
- Ligustrum sinense (Chinese privet)
- Ligustrum vulgare (European privet, wild privet)
- Linaria dalmatica (Dalmatian toadflax)
- Linaria vulgaris (yellow toadflax)
- Lolium perenne (Perennial Ryegrass)
- Lonicera japonica (Japanese honeysuckle)
- Lonicera maackii (Amur honeysuckle)
- Lonicera morrowii (Morrow's honeysuckle)
- Lonicera tatarica (Tartarian honeysuckle)
- Lygodium japonicum (Japanese climbing fern)
- Lygodium microphyllum (Old World climbing fern, climbing maidenhair)
- Lysimachia nummularia (creeping Jenny, herb twopence, moneywort, twopenny grass)
- Lythrum salicaria (purple loosestrife, purple lythrum, spiked loosestrife)
- Megathyrsus maximus (Guineagrass)
- Melaleuca quinquenervia (broad-leaved paper bark, paper bark tea tree, niaouli)
- Melia azedarach (bead tree, ceylon cedar, Chinaberry, lunumidella, Persian lilac, white cedar)
- Melinis repens (Natal grass, Natal redtop, rose Natal grass)
- Mentha spp. (peppermint, spearmint)
- Microstegium vimineum (Japanese stiltgrass, Nepalese browntop)
- Mimosa pudica (humble plant, shameful plant, sensitive plant, sleeping grass, touch-me-not)
- Myriophyllum spicatum (Eurasian water milfoil, spiked water milfoil)
- Nandina Domestica (heavenly bamboo)
- Nasturtium officinale (watercress)
- Nicotiana glauca (tree tobacco)
- Onopordum acanthium (cotton thistle, heraldic thistle, Scots thistle, Scottish thistle, woolly thistle)
- Paederia foetida (skunk vine)
- Panicum repens (torpedo grass)
- Pastinaca sativa (parsnip)
- Paulownia tomentosa (princess tree)
- Pentanema britannicum (British yellowhead)
- Persicaria perfoliata (Asiatic tearthumb, Chinese tearthumb, devil armor, devil's tail tearthumb, mile-a-minute weed)
- Persicaria vulgaris (pink lady's thumb)
- Phalaris arundinacea (reed canarygrass)
- Phragmites australis (common reed)
- Phyllostachys aurea (golden bamboo)
- Pilosella aurantiaca (orange hawkweed, tawny hawkweed)
- Plantago major (broadleaf plantain)
- Poa pratensis (Kentucky Bluegrass)
- Pontederia crassipes (common water hyacinth)
- Potamogeton crispus (curly-leaf pondweed)
- Prunus cerasifera (Cherry-plum)
- Pueraria montana var. lobata (kudzu vine)
- Pyrus calleryana (Bradford pear)
- Ranunculus bulbosus (Bulbous Buttercup)
- Reynoutria japonica (syn. Fallopia japonica) (fleeceflower, Japanese knotweed)
- Rhamnus cathartica (common buckthorn)
- Rhaponticum repens (Russian knapweed)
- Robinia pseudoacacia (black locust, false acacia) – native to the U.S., but widely planted outside its restricted range where it has become invasive
- Rosa bracteata (MacCartney rose)
- Rosa multiflora (baby rose, multiflora rose, rambler rose)
- Rubus armeniacus (Armenian blackberry, Himalayan blackberry)
- Rubus phoenicolasius (Japanese wineberry, wine raspberry, wineberry)
- Rumex crispus (curled dock, curly dock, narrow dock, sour dock, yellow dock)
- Salvia aethiopis (Mediterranean sage, African sage)
- Salvinia molesta (giant salvinia, kariba weed)
- Schinus terebinthifolia (aroeira, Brazilian pepper, Christmasberry, Florida holly, rose pepper)
- Sherardia arvensis (Field Madder)
- Solanum dulcamara (woody nightshade)
- Solanum nigrum (black nightshade)
- Solanum viarum (tropical soda apple)
- Sorghum halepense (Johnson grass)
- Spiraea japonica (Japanese spiraea)
- Sporobolus alterniflorus (saltmarsh cordgrass, smooth cordgrass)
- Striga asiatica (Asiatic witchweed)
- Taeniatherum caput-medusae (medusahead)
- Tamarix spp. (saltcedar, tamarisk)
- Tanacetum vulgare (common tansy)
- Taraxacum officinale (Dandelion)
- Trapa natans (water caltrop, water chestnut)
- Triadica sebifera (syn. Sapium sebiferum; Chinese tallow tree, Florida aspen, gray popcorn tree)
- Verbascum thapsus (common mullein)
- Verbena brasiliensis (Brazilian Vervain)
- Vinca minor (lesser periwinkle)
- Vincetoxicum nigrum (black swallow-wort, Louise's swallow-wort, black dog-strangling vine)
- Vincetoxicum rossicum (dog-strangling vine, swallowwort)
- Vitex rotundifolia (beach vitex)

== Invertebrates ==
=== Insects ===
- Acrolepiopsis assectella (leek moth)
- Adelges piceae (balsam woolly adelgid)
- Adelges tsugae (hemlock woolly adelgid)
- Aedes albopictus (Asian tiger mosquito)
- Aethina tumida (small hive beetle)
- Agrilus planipennis (emerald ash borer)
- Aleurocanthus woglumi (citrus blackfly)
- Anastrepha ludens (Mexican fruit fly)
- Anastrepha suspensa (Greater Antilliean fruit fly)
- Anoplophora glabripennis (Asian long-horned beetle)
- Aphis spiraecola (green citrus aphid)
- Apis mellifera (European honeybee)
- Apis mellifera scutellata (Africanized honeybee)
- Archips fuscocupreanus (exotic leafroller moth)
- Aulacaspis yasumatsui (cycad aulacaspis scale)
- Bemisia tabaci (silverleaf whitefly)
- Cactoblastis cactorum (cactus moth)
- Cerataphis lataniae (palm aphid)
- Ceratitis capitata (Mediterranean fruit fly)
- Cnestus mutilatus (Camphor shot borer)
- Coptotermes formosanus (Formosan subterranean termite)
- Cryptotermes brevis (West Indian drywood termite)
- Ctenarytaina eucalypti (blue gum psyllid)
- Culex quinquefasciatus (southern house mosquito)
- Diabrotica virgifera (western corn rootworm)
- Diaphorina citri (Asian citrus psyllid)
- Dinoderus minutus (Bamboo borer)
- Diprion similis (introduced pine sawfly)
- Drosophila suzukii (spotted wing drosophila)
- Duponchelia fovealis (a moth from the Mediterranean region)
- Elatobium abietinum (green spruce aphid)
- Epiphyas postvittana (light brown apple moth)
- Epitrix tuberis (tuber flea beetle)
- Euwallacea fornicatus (Polyphagous and Kuroshio shot hole borers)
- Forficula auricularia (common earwig)
- Frankliniella occidentalis (western flower thrips)
- Gilpinia hercyniae (European spruce sawfly)
- Glycaspis brimblecombei (red gum lerp psyllid)
- Halyomorpha halys (brown marmorated stink bug)
- Harmonia axyridis (Asian lady beetle)
- Homalodisca vitripennis (glassy winged sharpshooter)
- Hypogeococcus pungens (cactus mealybug)
- Icerya purchasi (cottony cushion scale)
- Leptocybe invasa (Blue gum chalcid wasp)
- Lilioceris lilii (scarlet lily beetle)
- Linepithema humile (Argentine ant)
- Lycorma delicatula (Spotted lanternfly)
- Lymantria dispar (European spongy moth)
- Maconellicoccus hirsutus (pink hibiscus mealybug)
- Metamasius callizona (bromeliad beetle)
- Monomorium pharaonis (pharaoh ant)
- Myrmica rubra (Common European Red Ant)
- Neodiprion sertifer (European pine sawfly)
- Neolecanium cornuparvum (magnolia scale)
- Opogona sacchari (Banana moth)
- Papilio demoleus (common lime butterfly)
- Paracoccus marginatus (papaya mealybug)
- Paratachardina pseudolobata (lobate lac scale)
- Paratrechina longicornis (longhorn crazy ant)
- Pheidole megacephala (big-headed ant)
- Phenacoccus solenopsis (cotton mealybug)
- Phyllocnistis citrella (citrus leafminer)
- Pineus pini (pine woolly aphid)
- Polistes dominula (European paper wasp)
- Popillia japonica (Japanese beetle)
- Pseudococcus viburni (obscure mealybug)
- Rhagoletis pomonella (apple maggot)
- Rhinocyllus conicus (thistle-head weevil)
- Rhyacionia buoliana (pine shoot moth)
- Scirtothrips dorsalis (chili thrips)
- Scirtothrips perseae (avocado thrips)
- Scolytus schevyrewi (banded elm bark beetle)
- Solenopsis invicta (red imported fire ant)
- Solenopsis richteri (black imported fire ant)
- Sternochetus mangiferae (mango seed weevil)
- Tapinoma melanocephalum (ghost ant)
- Tetropium fuscum (brown spruce longhorn beetle)
- Thrips palmi (melon thrips)
- Tipula paludosa (European crane fly)
- Toxoptera citricida (brown citrus aphid)
- Trichomyrmex destructor (destructive trailing ant)
- Vespula germanica (European wasp)
- Wasmannia auropunctata (electric ant)
- Xanthogaleruca luteola (elm-leaf beetle)
- Xyleborinus saxesenii (fruit-tree pinhole borer)
- Xyleborus dispar (pear blight beetle)
- Xyleborus glabratus (redbay ambrosia beetle)
- Xyleborus similis
- Xylosandrus compactus (black twig borer)
- Xylosandrus crassiusculus (Asian ambrosia beetle)
- Xylosandrus germanus (black timber bark beetle)
- Xylosandrus morigerus (brown twig beetle)

=== Arachnids ===
- Acarapis woodi (honey bee tracheal mite)
- Aculops fuchsiae (fuchsia gall mite)
- Raoiella indica (red palm mite)
- Rhipicephalus microplus (Asian blue tick)
- Trichonephila clavata (Joro spider)
- Varroa destructor (Varroa mite)

=== Worms ===
- Amynthas agrestis (Asian jumping worm)
- Anguillicoloides crassus (swim bladder worm)
- Bothriocephalus acheilognathi (Asian tapeworm)
- Ficopomatus enigmaticus (Australian tubeworm)
- Globodera rostochiensis (golden nematode)
- Lumbricus rubellus (leaf worm)
- Lumbricus terrestris (common earthworm, nightcrawler)
- Platydemus manokwari (land planarian)

=== Aquatic arthropods ===
- Amphibalanus improvisus (bay barnacle)
- Bythotrephes cederstroemi (spiny water flea)
- Carcinus maenas (European green crab)
- Cercopagis pengoi (fishhook waterflea)
- Daphnia lumholtzi
- Eriocheir sinensis (Chinese mitten crab)
- Hemigrapsus sanguineus (Japanese shore crab)
- Limnoria quadripunctata (gribble)
- Orconectes virilis (virile crayfish)
- Pacifastacus leniusculus (signal crayfish)
- Procambarus clarkii (red swamp crawfish)
- Sphaeroma terebrans (mangrove-boring isopod)

=== Mollusks ===
==== Freshwater snails ====
- Bithynia tentaculata (faucet snail)
- Cipangopaludina chinensis (Chinese mystery snail)
- Marisa cornuarietis (Colombian ramshorn apple snail)
- Melanoides tuberculata (red-rimmed melania)
- Pomacea canaliculata (channeled applesnail)
- Pomacea maculata (island applesnail)
- Potamopyrgus antipodarum (New Zealand mud snail)

==== Freshwater clams ====
- Corbicula fluminea (Asian clam)
- Dreissena polymorpha (zebra mussel)
- Dreissena rostriformis bugensis (quagga mussel)

==== Sea snails ====
- Crepidula fornicata (common slipper shell)
- Littorina littorea (common periwinkle)
- Rapana venosa (veined rapa whelk)

==== Land slugs ====
- Deroceras invadens (tramp slug)
- Deroceras laeve (marsh slug)
- Deroceras reticulatum (grey garden slug)
- Limax maximus (leopard slug)
- Milax gagates (greenhouse slug)

==== Land snails ====
- Cornu aspersum (garden snail)
- Euglandina rosea (rosy wolfsnail)
- Theba pisana (white garden snail)
- Lissachatina fulica (giant East African Snail)
- Zachrysia provisoria (Cuban brown snail)

== Fish ==
- Acanthogobius flavimanus (yellowfin goby)
- Alosa pseudoharengus (alewife)
- Ameiurus nebulosus (brown bullhead)
- Astronotus ocellatus (oscar)
- Aulonocara (peacock cichlid)
- Belonesox belizanus (pike topminnow)
- Channa argus (northern snakehead)
- Channa marulius (bullseye snakehead)
- Chitala ornata (clown featherback)
- Cichlasoma bimaculatum (black acara)
- Clarias batrachus (walking catfish)
- Coptodon zillii (redbelly tilapia)
- Ctenopharyngodon idella (grass carp)
- Cyprinella lutrensis (red shiner)
- Cyprinus carpio (common carp)
- Gambusia holbrooki (eastern mosquitofish)
- Gymnocephalus cernuus (Eurasian ruffe)
- Hemichromis letourneuxi (African jewelfish)
- Hypophthalmichthys molitrix (silver carp)
- Hypophthalmichthys nobilis (bighead carp)
- Ictalurus furcatus (blue catfish)
- Ictalurus punctatus (channel catfish)
- Lepomis cyanellus (green sunfish)
- Mayaheros urophthalmus (Mayan cichlid)
- Micropterus salmoides (largemouth bass)
- Misgurnus anguillicaudatus (Oriental weatherloach)
- Monopterus albus (Asian swamp eel)
- Morone americana (white perch)
- Mylopharyngodon piceus (black carp)
- Neogobius melanostomus (round goby)
- Oreochromis aureus (blue tilapia)
- Pelmatolapia mariae (spotted tilapia)
- Petromyzon marinus (sea lamprey)
- Pterois miles (common lionfish)
- Pterois volitans (red lionfish)
- Scardinius erythropthalmus (common rudd)
- Xiphophorus hellerii (green swordtail)

== Reptiles and amphibians ==
- Anolis sagrei (brown anole)
- Anolis wattsi (Watts' anole)
- Apalone spinifera (spiny softshell turtle)
- Caiman crocodilus (spectacled caiman)
- Ctenosaura similis (black spiny-tailed iguana)
- Eleutherodactylus coqui (common coquí)
- Eleutherodactylus planirostris (greenhouse frog)
- Hemidactylus frenatus (common house gecko)
- Hemidactylus turcicus (Mediterranean house gecko)
- Iguana iguana (green iguana)
- Nerodia fasciata (southern watersnake)
- Nerodia sipedon (northern watersnake)
- Osteopilus septentrionalis (Cuban tree frog)
- Podarcis sicula (Italian wall lizard) – Considered invasive in California, but not in its most famous introduction site of the Cincinnati area.
- Python bivittatus (Burmese python)
- Rana catesbeiana (bullfrog)
- Rhinella marina (cane toad)
- Salvator merianae (Argentine black and white tegu)
- Trachemys scripta elegans (red-eared slider)
- Trioceros jacksonii (Jackson's chameleon)
- Varanus niloticus (Nile monitor)
- Xenopus laevis (African clawed frog)

== Mammals ==
- Ammotragus lervia (Barbary sheep)
- Axis axis (chital)
- Canis familiaris (dog)
- Capra aegagrus (feral goat)
- Cricetomys gambianus (Gambian giant pouched rat)
- Dama dama (fallow deer)
- Equus asinus (donkey)
- Equus caballus (feral horse)
- Felis catus (domestic cat, feral)
- Lepus europaeus (European hare)
- Macaca mulatta (rhesus macaque)
- Mus musculus (house mouse)
- Myocastor coypus (coypu, nutria)
- Ovis aries (sheep)
- Oryx gazella (gemsbok)
- Rattus norvegicus (brown rat)
- Rattus rattus (black rat)
- Sciurus aureogaster (Mexican gray squirrel)
- Sciurus aberti (Abert's squirrel)
- Oryctolagus cuniculus (European rabbit)
- Phacochoerus (warthog)
- Sus scrofa (wild boar)
- Urva auropunctata (small Asian mongoose)

== Birds ==
- Acridotheres tristis (Common myna)
- Alectoris chukar (chukar)
- Alopochen aegyptiaca (Egyptian goose)
- Aratinga nenday (Nanday parakeet)
- Cairina moschata (Muscovy duck)
- Columba livia (rock pigeon)
- Cygnus olor (mute swan)
- Haemorhous mexicanus (house finch)
- Molothrus bonariensis (shiny cowbird)
- Myiopsitta monachus (monk parakeet, Quaker parrot)
- Passer domesticus (house sparrow)
- Passer montanus (Eurasian tree sparrow)
- Phasianus colchicus (ring-necked pheasant)
- Pavo cristatus (Indian peafowl)
- Perdix perdix (grey partridge)
- Psittacula krameri (rose-ringed parakeet)
- Pycnonotus cafer (Red-vented bulbul)
- Pycnonotus jocosus (red-whiskered bulbul)
- Streptopelia decaocto (Eurasian collared dove)
- Sturnus vulgaris (European starling)

== Pathogens ==
- Avipoxvirus (fowlpox)
- Batrachochytrium dendrobatidis (chytridiomycosis)
- Cryphonectria parasitica (chestnut blight)
- Flavivirus (West Nile virus)
- Myxobolus cerebralis (whirling disease)
- Ophiostoma ulmi (Dutch elm disease)
- Paramyxovirus (Exotic Newcastle disease)
- Phakopsora spp. (soybean rust)
- Phytophthora ramorum (sudden oak death)
- Potyvirus (plum pox)
- Pseudogymnoascus destructans (white-nose syndrome)

== Others ==
- Didymosphenia geminata (didymo, rock snot)

== See also ==
- Invasive species in Canada
- Invasive species in Mexico
- Invasive species in the United States
- United States National Agricultural Library
