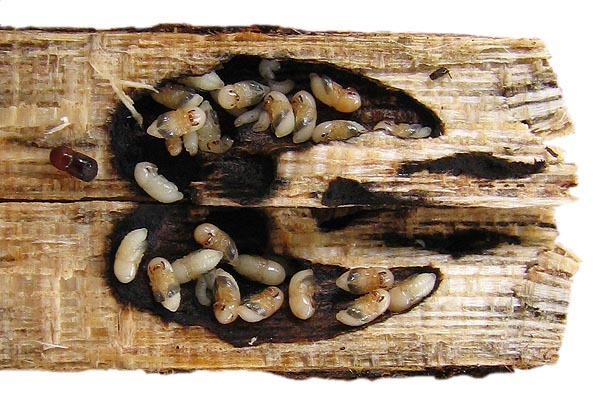
- Larvae of the granulate ambrosia beetle

Scientific classification
- Kingdom: Animalia
- Phylum: Arthropoda
- Class: Insecta
- Order: Coleoptera
- Suborder: Polyphaga
- Infraorder: Cucujiformia
- Family: Curculionidae
- Genus: Xylosandrus
- Species: X. crassiusculus

Binomial name
- Xylosandrus crassiusculus (Motschulsky, 1866)

Synonyms
- Xylosandrus semiopacus Eichhoff

= Xylosandrus crassiusculus =

Species of beetle

Xylosandrus crassiusculus, known generally as the Asian ambrosia beetle or granulate ambrosia beetle, is a species of tropical bark beetle in the family Curculionidae. It is native to Asia and has spread to Africa, Europe, Australasia and the Americas. The adult beetle is reddish-brown and some 2 to 3 mm (0.08 to 0.12 in) long.

== Distribution and habitat ==
This beetle is native to Asia, and has spread to other parts of the world as an invasive species in Africa, the Americas, Europe and Oceania. It was first reported in the southeastern United States in 1974, had reached Costa Rica by 1996, Panama by 2003, and Guatemala and northern Brazil by 2008. It appeared in Argentina in 2001, nearly a decade before it was detected in southern Brazil and Uruguay; as the latter two countries were vigilant, with long-term trapping programmes, the Argentine collection may represent a direct introduction from a non-American source, with the insects later spreading northwards up the coast.

== Life cycle ==
Females mate with their siblings before leaving the galleries. Although males are flightless, females can fly and disperse to other potential host trees. Here they excavate tunnels and lay eggs. The larvae develop and enlarge the galleries and the female stays with the brood, overwintering there.

== Ecology ==
Although the larvae of ambrosia beetles develop in cavities in wood, the food of both adults and larvae is exclusively a symbiotic fungus which the female beetle introduces into the tunnels and galleries she excavates. In the case of Xylosandrus crassiusculus, the fungus has been identified as Ambrosiella roeperi. It has been shown that the beetle is attracted to the smell of this fungus, which may concentrate attacks on specific trees. The beetle can infest branches as small as 1.5 cm (0.6 in) across and trunks 2.5 to 6 cm (1.0 to 2.4 in) in diameter.

This beetle is polyphagous, infesting many species of host trees. It is usually restricted to stressed young trees and nursery stock, but sometimes attacks apparently healthy young trees. It additionally infests stacked timber, where it causes economic damage. In the United States, trees and shrubs infested include oak, cherry and crape myrtle, as well as pecan, peach, plum, persimmon, elm, sweet gum, magnolia, fig, buckeye and sweet potato. In Europe its host is the carob (Ceratonia siliqua), while in Israel, where the carob grows, its only known host is the Palestine oak (Quercus calliprinos). In India, the beetles infest plantation crops such as areca, coconut, and rubber, fruit plants like rambutan, cocoa, and jackfruit, and trees like teak.

=== Host plants ===
- Acacia decurrens
- Acacia mangium
- Acrocarpus
- Adina rubescens
- Adinandra dumosa
- Adinobotrys atropurpureus
- Afzelia bipindensis
- Agathis
- Albizia chinensis
- Albizia ferruginea
- Albizia gummifera
- Albizia lebbek
- Albizia stipulata
- Albizia zygia
- Allaeanthus luzonicus
- Alnus
- Alstonia
- Altingia excelsa
- Amoora
- Angylocalyx pynaertii
- Anisoptera
- Anthonotha fragrans
- Antiaris africana
- Antrocaryon micraster
- Artocarpus chaplasha
- Aucoumea klaineana
- Barteria nigritiana
- Bauhinia tomentosa
- Bischofia javanica
- Buchanania arborescens
- Buchanania sessilifolia
- Calamus
- Calophyllum tetrapterum
- Camellia sinensis
- Canarium
- Cannabis sativa
- Carapa procera
- Carica papaya
- Carya illinoinensis
- Caryota
- Castanea argentea
- Castanea javanica
- Castanea sativa
- Castanopsis
- Castilla elastica
- Casuarina equisetifolia
- Cecropia
- Cedrela toona
- Ceiba pentandra
- Ceiba thonningii
- Celtis brownii
- Celtis mildbraedii
- Celtis zenkeri
- Chlorophora excelsa
- Chloroxylon swietenia
- Chrysophyllum
- Cinchona
- Cinnamomum camphora
- Cistanthera
- Cleistopholis patens
- Coelocaryon preussii
- Coffea robusta
- Cylicodiscus gabunensis
- Cynometra hankie
- Dacryodes pubescens
- Dactylocladus stenostachya
- Dalbergia latifolia
- Dalbergia sissoo
- Dialium corbisieri
- Dialium pachyphyllum
- Dillenia pentagyna
- Dimocarpus longan
- Dipterocarpus baudii
- Distemonanthus benthamianus
- Doona zeylanica
- Dryobalanops
- Drypetes leonensis
- Elaeis guineensis
- Elaeocarpus sericeus
- Elaeocarpus tetrapterum
- Elaeocarpus tuberculatus
- Entandrophragma angolense
- Entandrophragma cylindricum
- Entandrophragma utile
- Erythrina lithosperma
- Erythrophleum guineense
- Eucalyptus deglupta
- Eucalyptus robusta
- Eugenia caryophyllus
- Eugenia jambolana
- Eupatorium pallescens
- Fagara macrophylla
- Fagus crenata
- Falcataria moluccana
- Ficus
- Fleroya stipulosa
- Garcinia polyantha
- Garcinia punctata
- Gliricidia maculate
- Gluta tourtour
- Gluta travancorica
- Gluta usitata
- Gmelina arborea
- Gossweilerondendron balsamiferum
- Grevillea robusta
- Guarea cedrata
- Guarea laurentii
- Hannoa klaineana
- Haronga paniculata
- Hevea brasiliensis
- Holigarna arnottiana
- Hopea beccariana
- Hopea ferrea
- Hopea odorata
- Hopea parviflora
- Hopea wightiana
- Julbernardia seretii
- Khaya ivorensis
- Kayea floribunda
- Koompassia malaccensis
- Lagerstroemia speciosa
- Lannea grandis
- Lasiococca
- Lecaniodiscus cupanioides
- Leea crispa
- Leea sambucina
- Lithocarpus wallichiana
- Lophira procera
- Lovoa klaineana
- Lovoa trichilioides
- Luffa
- Macaranga monandra
- Machilus odoratissimus
- Macrolobium macrophyllum
- Malus pumila
- Mangifera indica
- Mansonia altissima
- Melochia umbellata
- Microcos coriacea
- Microcos pinnatifida
- Murraya koenigii
- Musanga cecropioides
- Myrianthus arboreus
- Myristica dactyloides
- Napoleonaea imperialis
- Nauclea diderrichii
- Ochthocosmus africanus
- Octomeles sumatrana
- Ongokea gore
- Pachylobus barteri
- Palaquium gutta
- Pancovia laurentii
- Parinari kerstingii
- Parishia
- Parkia bicolor
- Pithecellobium lobatum
- Piptadeniastrum africanum
- Protium pittieri
- Pycnanthus angolensis
- Quercus serrata
- Randia congolana
- Ricinodendron heudelotii
- Saccharum officinarum
- Sagraea laurina
- Sapium
- Scorodophloeus zenkeri
- Shorea guiso
- Shorea macroptera
- Shorea robusta
- Sindora
- Staudtia stipitata
- Sterculia macrophylla
- Sterculia oblonga
- Sterculia villosa
- Strombosia glaucescens
- Strombosiopsis tetrandra
- Styrax benzoin
- Swietenia macrophylla
- Synsepalum subcordatum
- Tectona grandis
- Terminalia ivorensis
- Terminalia superba
- Terminalia tomentosa
- Tessmannia africana
- Tessmannia anomala
- Tetrapleura
- Thalia geniculata
- Thea sinensis
- Theobroma cacao
- Topobea maurofernandeziana
- Trichilia heudelotii
- Trichilia prieureana
- Triplochiton scleroxylon
- Turraeanthus africana
- Vernonia arborea
- Vernonia conferta
- Vochysia ferruginea
- Xanthophyllum affine
