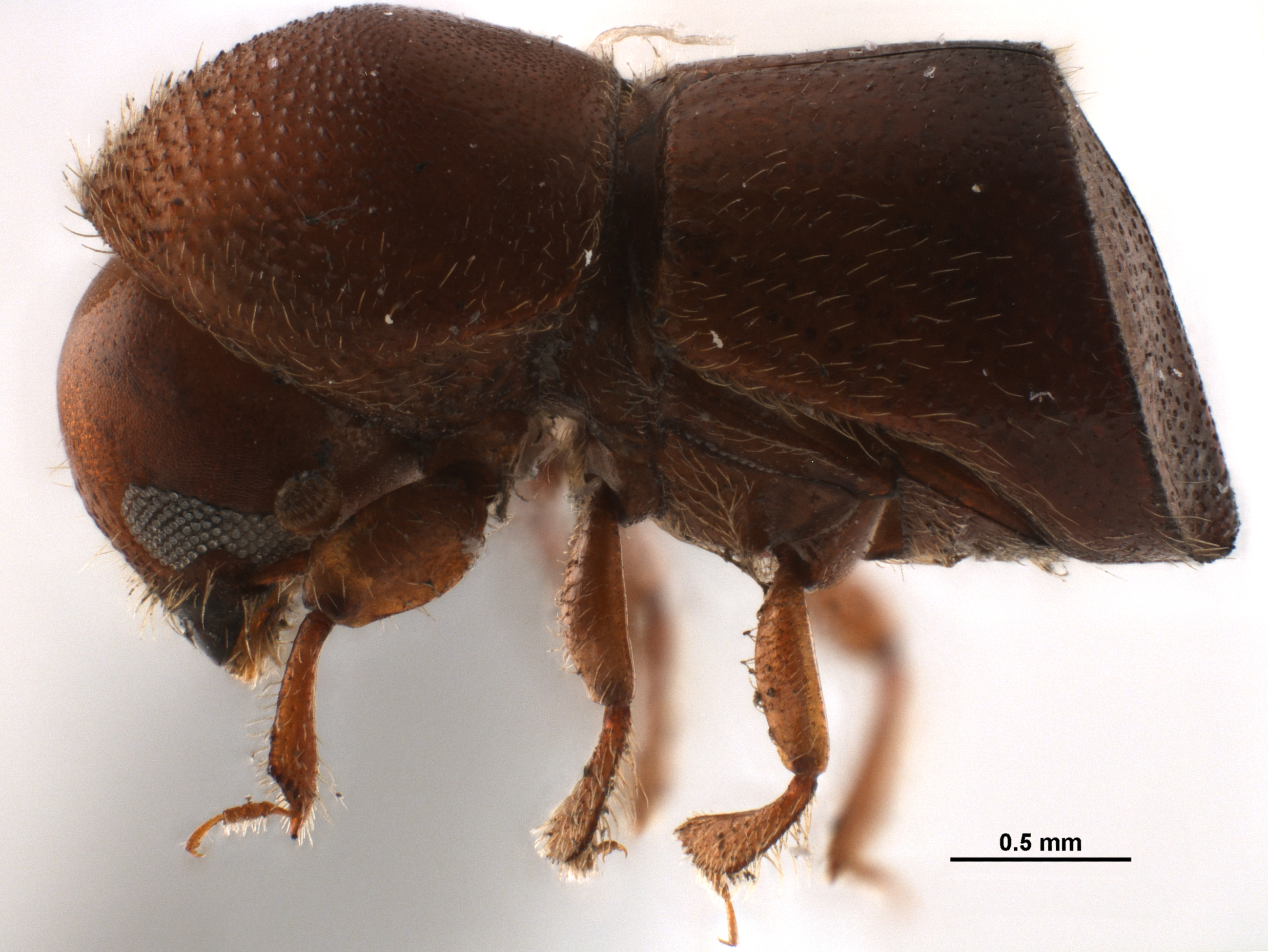

Scientific classification
- Kingdom: Animalia
- Phylum: Arthropoda
- Class: Insecta
- Order: Coleoptera
- Suborder: Polyphaga
- Infraorder: Cucujiformia
- Family: Curculionidae
- Genus: Xylosandrus
- Species: X. mancus

Binomial name
- Xylosandrus mancus (Blanford, 1898)

Synonyms
- Xyleborus mancus Blanford, 1898; Apoxyleborus mancus (Blanford): Wood, 1980; Xylosandrus mancus (Blanford): Wood, 1984; Xyleborus abruptus Sampson, 1914; Xyleborus mancus formosanus Eggers, 1930

= Xylosandrus mancus =

Species of beetle

Xylosandrus mancus is a species of weevil found in Afrotropical and Oriental regions.

== Distribution ==
It is native to Madagascar, Mauritania, Seychelles, Tanzania, China, India, Sri Lanka, Indonesia, Japan, Malaysian Peninsula, Philippines, Taiwan, Thailand and Vietnam.

== Description ==
Body length of the female ranges from 2.9 to 3.3 mm. Body yellowish brown to brown. Elytra dark brown at apex and declivity. Antennae and legs are yellowish brown. Antennea with 5 funicular segments and obliquely truncate club. Pronotal vestiture is semi-appressed and with hairy setae. Pronotal base covered with a dense patch of short erect setae that resemble a pronotal-mesonotal mycangium. Pronotal disc is moderately punctate. Pronotum consists with lateral costa and not carinate. Protibiae with 5 socketed teeth, whereas mesotibiae with 11 and metatibiae with 12 socketed teeth. In elytra, discal striae and interstriae multiseriate are punctate. Declivital elytral face is steep and abruptly separated from disc. Margin of the elytral declivity with a carina or sometimes forms a rim of granules that extends beyond the seventh interstriae by making a circumdeclivital ring.

A polyphagous species, it is found in many plants.

== Host plants ==
- Adenanthera pavonina
- Albizia
- Anacardium occidentale
- Aphanamixis rohituka
- Artocarpus dadah
- Brackenridgea hookeri
- Cassia fistula
- Cordia dichotoma
- Cordia myxa
- Dalbergia latifolia
- Dryobalanops aromatica
- Dryobalanops oblongifolia
- Gomphia serrata
- Grewia paniculata
- Hibiscus macrophyllus
- Hopea beccariana
- Hopea ferrea
- Hullettia dumosa
- Khaya senegalensis
- Litsea megacarpa
- Mangifera indica
- Melanorrhoea
- Nephelium lappaceum
- Palaquium gutta
- Pometia pinnata
- Quercus
- Rubroshorea leprosula
- Shorea bracteolata
- Shorea macroptera
- Shorea sumatrana
- Styrax benzoin
- Swietenia macrophylla
- Swietenia mahagoni
- Tectona grandis
- Theobroma cacao
- Toona sureni
- Tristania whiteana
- Vateria copallifera
- Vitex pubescens
