= North American Invasive Species Network =

American non-profit organization

The North American Invasive Species Network (NAISN) is an American non-profit organization formed in 2010 by a group of government scientists and universities in North America. The network integrates various invasive species institutes, centers, laboratories and networks from the US, Canada and Mexico to help meet the needs of public conservation land and waterway resource managers. Membership is targeted toward regional centers and institutes, research labs, and/or other groups and individuals with invasive species interests and qualification. Because invasive species are not restricted by jurisdictional boundary lines, it was formed as a single international network. Currently there are eight invasive species organizations in collaboration with NAISN.

== Overview ==
In 1997, a letter co-written by Don C. Schmitz, Dr. James T. Carlton, Dr. Daniel Simberloff, and Dr. Phyllis N. Windle, and signed by more than 500 scientists, resource and agriculture officials, urged the U.S. government to form a commission to recommend new strategies to prevent and manage invasive species. One of its recommendations was to form a center analogous to the Centers for Disease Control and Prevention (CDC) to help coordinate the multi-jurisdictional aspects of invasive species management in the U.S. The letter resulted in Executive Order 13112 on February 3, 1999, calling for the establishment of a national plan and creating the National Invasive Species Council.

As a result of a November 2010 workshop, led by Don C. Schmitz and Dan Simberloff, seven invasive species centers or institutes and one federally funded Canadian research network agreed to become part of the North American Invasive Species Network (NAISN). Since then, NAISN has added another Canadian member

In 2013, eight invasive species centers and institutes, and one regional network, are part of the North American Invasive Species Network (NAISN) either as a hub (1) or a node (2).

| Center/institute | Regional network |
|---|---|
| Center for Invasive Species Management | Montana (hub) |
| Center for Aquatic and Invasive Plants | Florida (hub) |
| CONABIO | Mexico (hub) |
| National Institute of Invasive Species Science | Colorado (hub) |
| Center for Invasive Species and Ecosystem Health | Georgia (hub) |
| Invasive Species Research Institute | Canada (hub) |
| Invasive Species Centre | Canada (hub) |
| Canadian Aquatic Invasive Species Network | Canada (node) |
| Geosystems Research Institute | Mississippi (hub) |

In 2011, NAISN was established as a non-profit organization in the United States (501(C)3) to unify and connect these existing invasive species efforts into a single network. Participating member organizations, groups, or individuals can participate as Hubs1, Nodes2, or Affiliates3.

In April 2012, the third NAISN workshop was held to develop a five-year business strategic plan It is envisioned that, as NAISN grows and expands, the Network will work to enhance information exchange among scientists, government agencies, and private landowners through the use of a comprehensive website modeled after the Centers for Disease Control and Prevention (CDC) website, and the aggregation of information from over 250 current databases that contain information of invasive species. NAISN will also begin to track invasive species expenditures through annual surveys of federal, provincial, state, municipal and tribal governments and oversee a comprehensive analysis of economic impacts of invasive species; such information could readily be used by policy-makers and elected officials. Finally, NAISN will provide a single source for the news media and develop and implement national public awareness campaigns about invasive species.

Regional Network
1 Hubs are defined as entities (institutions, organizations, or groups) that coordinate invasive species management activities with a regional, international, thematic, and/or taxonomically based focus.
2 Nodes are government agencies or other organizational entities with a recognized role in the management of invasive species. Nodes may be members of a specific Hub or collaborate independently with the NAISN Board of Directors.
3 Affiliates are individuals with recognized expertise and interest in invasive species issues.

== See also ==
- List of invasive species in North America
