= Xylosandrus pygmaeus =

Scientific classification
- Kingdom: Animalia
- Phylum: Arthropoda
- Class: Insecta
- Order: Coleoptera
- Suborder: Polyphaga
- Infraorder: Cucujiformia
- Family: Curculionidae
- Genus: Xylosandrus
- Species: X. pygmaeus

Binomial name
- Xylosandrus pygmaeus (Eggers, 1940)

Synonyms
- Xyleborus pygmaeus Eggers, 1940; Xylosandrus pygmaeus (Eggers): Browne, 1963

Species of beetle

Xylosandrus pygmaeus is a species of weevil found in Indonesia, Malaysia and Sri Lanka.

A polyphagous species, host plants of the species are Litsea amara, and Vitex pubescens.
