= Xylosandrus discolor =

Scientific classification
- Kingdom: Animalia
- Phylum: Arthropoda
- Class: Insecta
- Order: Coleoptera
- Suborder: Polyphaga
- Infraorder: Cucujiformia
- Family: Curculionidae
- Genus: Xylosandrus
- Species: X. discolor

Binomial name
- Xylosandrus discolor (Blanford, 1898)

Synonyms
- Xyleborus discolor Blanford, 1898; Xyleborus posticestriatus Eggers, 1939; Xylosandrus posticestriatus (Eggers): Nunberg, 1959

Species of beetle

Xylosandrus discolor is a species of weevil found in Australia, Micronesia, Myanmar, China, India, Sri Lanka, Indonesia, Malaysia, Taiwan and Thailand.

== Description ==
Body length of the female ranges from 1.8 to 2.0 mm. Body bicolored. Pronotum light brown. Elytra dark brown. Antennae and legs are yellowish brown. Antennea with 5 funicular segments and obliquely truncate club. Pronotal vestiture of erect and hairy setae. Pronotal base covered with a dense patch of short erect setae. Pronotal disc is densely asperate-punctate. Pronotum consists with lateral costa and carina. Protibiae with 4 to 5 socketed teeth, whereas mesotibiae and metatibiae with 8 to 9 socketed teeth. In elytra, discal striae and interstriae multiseriate is punctate. Diclivital elytral face is steep and abruptly separated from disc. Elytral striae coarsely granulate with appressed hairy setae.

A polyphagous species, it is found in many plants. It is primarily a shoot borer.

== Host plants ==
- Ailanthus altissima
- Albizia
- Allamanda cathartica
- Bauhinia variegata
- Camellia sinensis
- Cassia multijuga
- Castanopsis fargesii
- Cedrela toona
- Chloroxylon swietenia
- Coffea arabica
- Coffea robusta
- Hevea brasiliensis
- Juglans nigra
- Machilus indica
- Mangifera indica
- Persea americana
- Pterospermum acerifolium
- Rhus chinensis
- Sophora japonica
- Swietenia mahagoni
- Tephrosia candida
- Terminalia myriocarpa
- Terminalia procera
- Theobroma cacao
- Vitis vinifera
