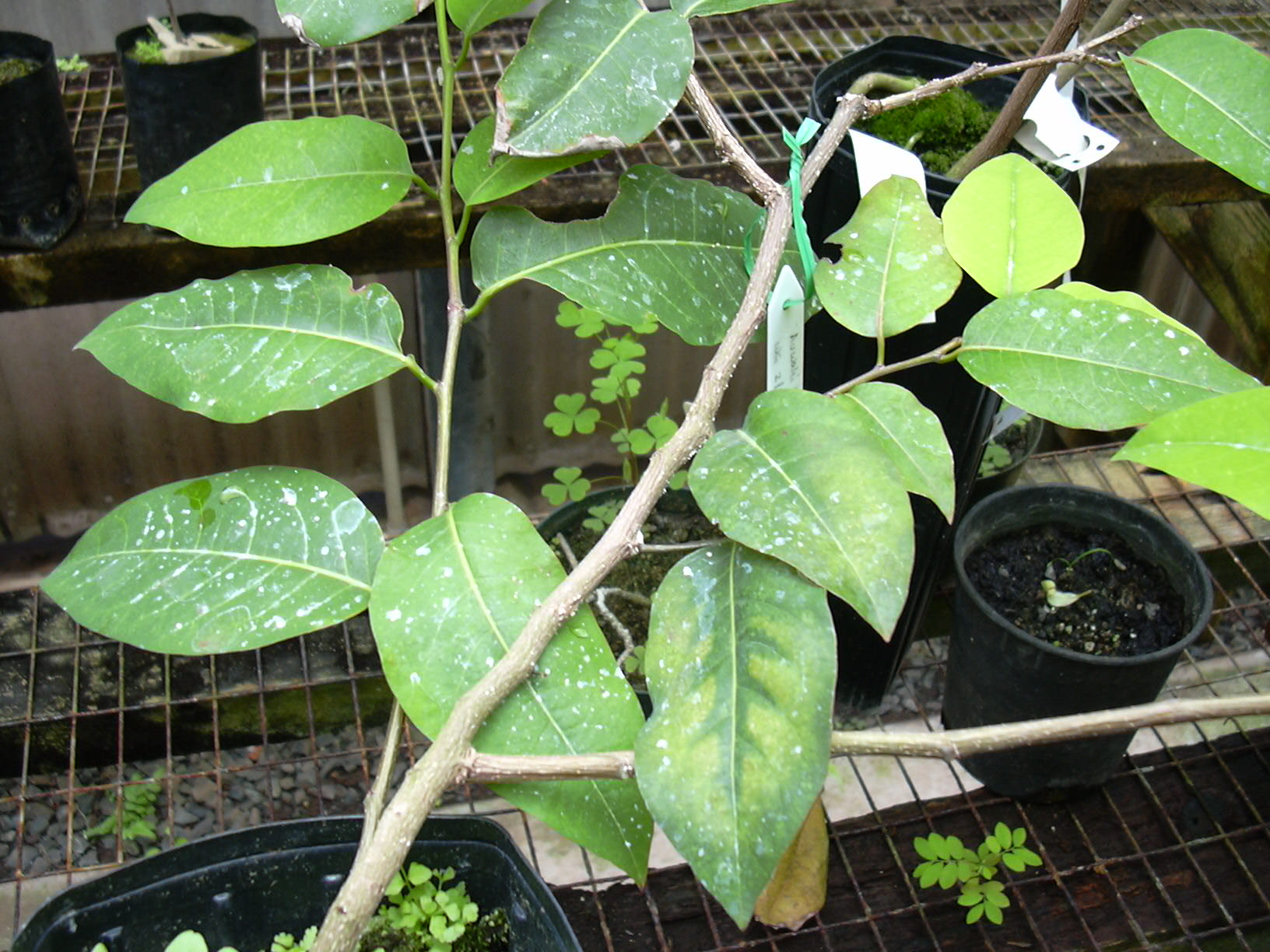

Conservation status
- Critically Endangered (IUCN 2.3)

Scientific classification
- Kingdom: Plantae
- Clade: Tracheophytes
- Clade: Angiosperms
- Clade: Eudicots
- Clade: Rosids
- Order: Malpighiales
- Family: Phyllanthaceae
- Genus: Flueggea
- Species: F. neowawraea

Binomial name
- Flueggea neowawraea W.J.Hayden (1987)

Synonyms
- Drypetes phyllanthoides (Rock) Sherff; Neowawraea phyllanthoides Rock

= Flueggea neowawraea =

Mēhamehame

Species of tree

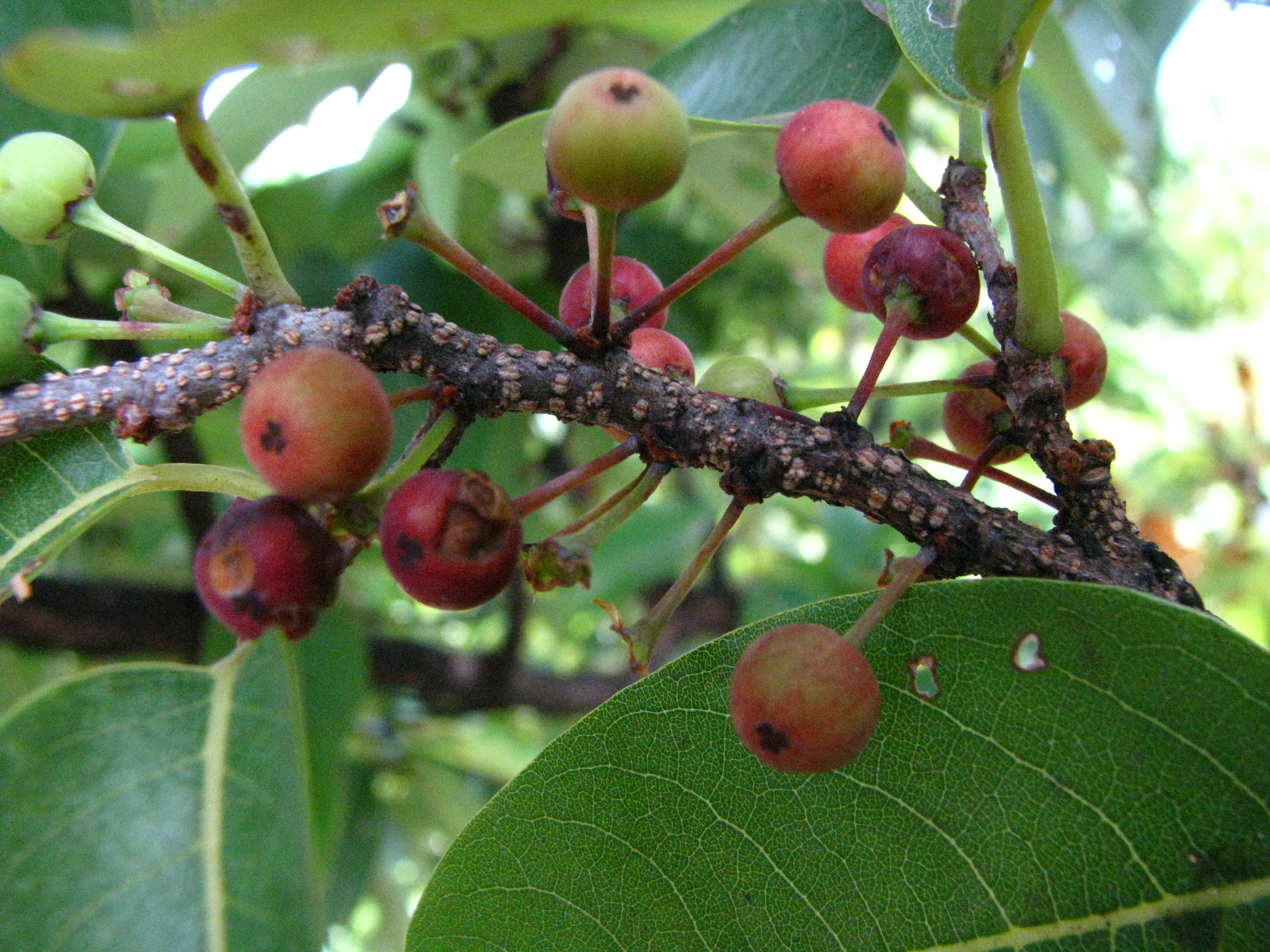
Fruit of Flueggea neowawraea

Flueggea neowawraea, the mēhamehame, is a species of flowering tree in the family Phyllanthaceae, that is endemic to Hawaii. It can be found in dry, coastal mesic, and mixed mesic forests at elevations of 250 to 1,000 m (820 to 3,280 ft). It is the only native species in the genus that is present in the Hawaiian Islands. Associated plants include kukui (Aleurites moluccanus), hame (Antidesma pulvinatum), ʻahakea (Bobea sp.), alaheʻe (Psydrax odorata), olopua (Nestegis sandwicensis), hao (Rauvolfia sandwicensis), and aʻiaʻi (Streblus pendulinus). Mēhamehame was one of the largest trees in Hawaiʻi, reaching a height of 30 m (98 ft) and trunk diameter of 2 m (6.6 ft). Native Hawaiians used the extremely hard wood of this tree to make weaponry.

== Description ==
The bark of the tree is brown with oblong pores that cover it scatteredly. It has green, thin, papery, oval leaves near the top of the tree and pale green leaves in the lower part of the tree. It has buttressing roots that allow support to the massive tree. This species is usually dioecious with unisexual flowers requiring cross-pollination in order to reproduce. Both male and female flowers have green sepals with brownish tips. The fruit that is produced is round, fleshy, and a reddish brown color. It contains two slightly curved seeds that have a slight triangular shape.

== Habitat ==
The Mēhamehame can be found in dry, coastal mesic, and mixed mesic forests at elevations of 250 to 1,000 m (820 to 3,280 ft). The tree has been seen growing in moist forests in gulch bottoms and slopes. Then, on the islands of Maui and Hawaiʻi island, it has been seen growing on old forested lava flows. It can be historically found in Hawaiʻi on the Hawaiian islands Kauaʻi, Oʻahu, Molokaʻi, Maui, and Hawaiʻi Island. Now, found only on the Waiʻanae Mountains on Oʻahu, the southwestern side of Haleakala slopes on Maui, on the northwestern part of Kauaʻi, and the Kona coast of Hawaiʻi Island.

== Threats ==
Although it had declined along with other dry and mesic forest plants, many large trees could still be found until the 1970s. At that point, the arrival of the black twig borer (Xylosandrus compactus) caused a catastrophic collapse of the species. By the 1990s, the Mēhamehame was assessed as Critically Endangered by the IUCN Red List of Threatened Species and hasnʻt shown any improvement since then. It is believed to be less than 250 individuals are left with no young trees in sight. The remaining trees that are left are mostly found dead or almost dead, with a couple of limbs remaining on the tree or from existing as basal shoots from older trees. Most of the tree decline can be accounted for by black twig borer, but other threats like alien plants and ungulates have also contributed to the decline. Due to the decline of this specie, it is highly vulnerable and has a low reproductive success for reasons unknown. Because of the extreme durability of the wood and its easily recognized fluted pattern, many dead trunks can still be found.
