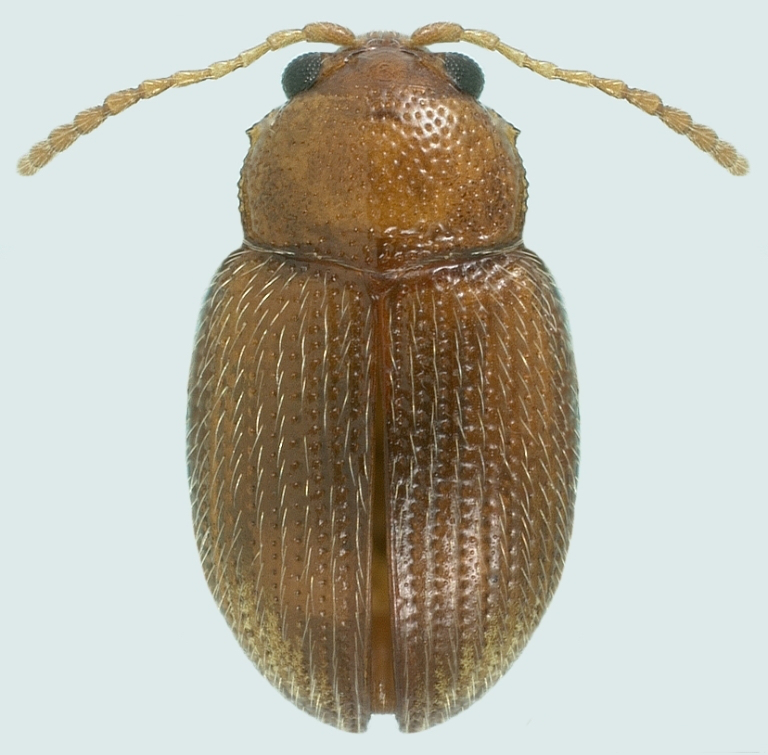

Scientific classification
- Kingdom: Animalia
- Phylum: Arthropoda
- Class: Insecta
- Order: Coleoptera
- Suborder: Polyphaga
- Infraorder: Cucujiformia
- Family: Chrysomelidae
- Tribe: Alticini
- Genus: Epitrix
- Species: E. hirtipennis

Binomial name
- Epitrix hirtipennis (F. E. Melsheimer, 1847)

= Epitrix hirtipennis =

Species of beetle

Epitrix hirtipennis, the tobacco flea beetle, is a species of flea beetle in the family Chrysomelidae. It is found in Central America, North America, Oceania, temperate Asia, and Europe.
