= Epitrix subcrinita =

Scientific classification
- Kingdom: Animalia
- Phylum: Arthropoda
- Clade: Pancrustacea
- Class: Insecta
- Order: Coleoptera
- Suborder: Polyphaga
- Infraorder: Cucujiformia
- Family: Chrysomelidae
- Tribe: Alticini
- Genus: Epitrix
- Species: E. subcrinita

Binomial name
- Epitrix subcrinita (J. L. LeConte, 1857)

Species of beetle

Epitrix subcrinita, the western potato flea beetle, is a species of flea beetle in the family Chrysomelidae. It is found in Central America and North America.
