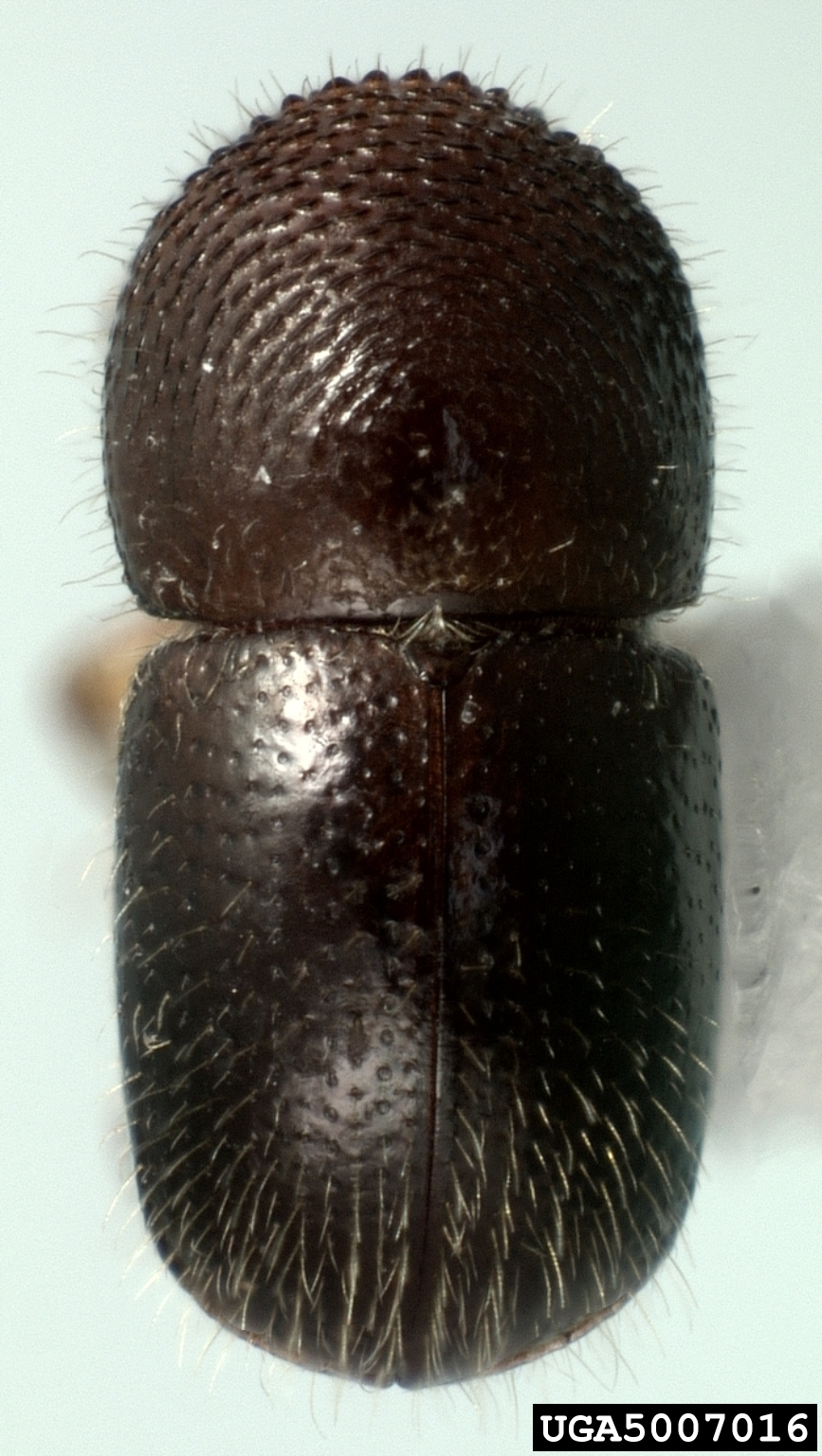
- An adult Xylosandrus compactus

Scientific classification
- Kingdom: Animalia
- Phylum: Arthropoda
- Class: Insecta
- Order: Coleoptera
- Suborder: Polyphaga
- Infraorder: Cucujiformia
- Family: Curculionidae
- Subfamily: Scolytinae
- Tribe: Xyleborini
- Genus: Xylosandrus; Reitter 1913

Species
- About 54, see text

Synonyms
- Apoxyleborus

= Xylosandrus =

Genus of beetles

Xylosandrus is a genus of beetles with approximately 54 species globally. The type species is Xyleborus morigerus (Blandford) 1894.

== Selected species ==
- Xylosandrus abruptoides (Schedl) 1955
- Xylosandrus abruptulus (Schedl) 1953
- Xylosandrus adherescens Schedl 1971
- Xylosandrus arquatus (Sampson) 1912
- Xylosandrus assequens Schedl 1971
- Xylosandrus ater (Eggers) 1923
- Xylosandrus borealis Nobuchi 1981
- Xylosandrus brevis (Eichhoff) 1877
- Xylosandrus butamali (Beeson) 1930
- Xylosandrus compactus (Eichhoff) 1875
- Xylosandrus corthyloides (Schedl) 1934
- Xylosandrus crassiusculus (Motschulsky) 1866
- Xylosandrus curtulus (Eichhoff) 1869
- Xylosandrus cylindrotomicus (Schedl) 1939
- Xylosandrus derupteterminatus (Schedl) 1951
- Xylosandrus deruptulus (Schedl) 1942
- Xylosandrus discolor (Blandford 1898)
- Xylosandrus diversepilosus (Eggers) 1941
- Xylosandrus eupatorii (Eggers) 1940
- Xylosandrus ferinus (Schedl) 1936
- Xylosandrus fijianus (Schedl) 1938
- Xylosandrus germanus (Blandford) 1894
- Xylosandrus gravidus (Blandford) 1898
- Xylosandrus hirsutipennis (Schedl) 1961
- Xylosandrus improcerus (Sampson) 1921
- Xylosandrus jaintianus (Schedl) 1967
- Xylosandrus laticeps (Wood) 1977
- Xylosandrus mancus (Blandford) 1898
- Xylosandrus mediocris (Schedl) 1942
- Xylosandrus mesuae (Eggers) 1930
- Xylosandrus metagermanus (Schedl) 1951
- Xylosandrus morigerus (Blandford) 1894
- Xylosandrus mutilatus (Blandford) 1894
- Xylosandrus nanus (Blandford) 1896
- Xylosandrus omissus (Schedl) 1961
- Xylosandrus oralis (Schedl) 1961
- Xylosandrus orbiculatus (Schedl) 1942
- Xylosandrus posticestriatus (Eggers) 1939
- Xylosandrus pseudosolidus (Schedl) 1936
- Xylosandrus pusillus (Schedl) 1961
- Xylosandrus pygmaeus (Eggers) 1940
- Xylosandrus retusus (Eichhoff) 1868
- Xylosandrus solidus (Eichhoff) 1868
- Xylosandrus squamulatus (Beaver) 1985
- Xylosandrus subsimiliformis (Eggers) 1939
- Xylosandrus subsimilis (Eggers) 1930
- Xylosandrus terminatis (Eggers) 1930
- Xylosandrus testudo (Eggers) 1939
- Xylosandrus ursa (Eggers) 1923
- Xylosandrus ursinus (Hagedorn) 1908
- Xylosandrus ursulus (Eggers) 1923
- Xylosandrus zimmermanni (Hopkins) 1915
