= Xylosandrus arquatus =

Scientific classification
- Kingdom: Animalia
- Phylum: Arthropoda
- Class: Insecta
- Order: Coleoptera
- Suborder: Polyphaga
- Infraorder: Cucujiformia
- Family: Curculionidae
- Genus: Xylosandrus
- Species: X. arquatus

Binomial name
- Xylosandrus arquatus (Sampson, 1912)

Synonyms
- Xyleborus arquatus Sampson, 1912

Species of beetle

Xylosandrus arquatus is a species of weevil endemic to Sri Lanka.

== Description ==
Body length of the female ranges from 2.3 to 2.5 mm. Pronotum light brown and distinctly lighter than elytra. Elytra black in color. Antennae and legs are light brown. Antennae consists with 5 funicular segments and obliquely truncate club. Pronotal vestiture of semi-appressed and hairy setae. Pronotal base covered with a dense patch of short and erect setae. This patch indicates the presence of pronotal-mesonotal mycangium. Pronotal disc is moderately granulate. Pronotum is with lateral non-carinate costa. Protibiae, mesotibiae and metatibiae with 8 each socketed teeth. Distal striae is punctate whereas elytral interstriae is uniseriately punctate. Elytral disc gradually curving into declivity which is convex and with six striae.

Mainly a seedling borer, the host plants of the species include, Cinnamomum zeylanicum, Symplocos loha and Neolitsea cassia.
