= Antrocaryon amazonicum =

Scientific classification
- Kingdom: Plantae
- Clade: Tracheophytes
- Clade: Angiosperms
- Clade: Eudicots
- Clade: Rosids
- Order: Sapindales
- Family: Anacardiaceae
- Genus: Antrocaryon
- Species: A. amazonicum

Binomial name
- Antrocaryon amazonicum (Ducke) B.L.Burtt & A.W.Hill

Synonyms
- Poupartia amazonica Ducke

Species of tree

Antrocaryon amazonicum is a species of tree in the cashew family, Anacardiaceae. It is native to Brazil.
