= Epitrix fasciata =

Scientific classification
- Kingdom: Animalia
- Phylum: Arthropoda
- Class: Insecta
- Order: Coleoptera
- Suborder: Polyphaga
- Infraorder: Cucujiformia
- Family: Chrysomelidae
- Genus: Epitrix
- Species: E. fasciata

Binomial name
- Epitrix fasciata Blatchley, 1918

Species of beetle

Epitrix fasciata, the banded epitrix, is a species of flea beetle in the family Chrysomelidae. It is found in the Caribbean, Central America, North America, Oceania, and South America.
