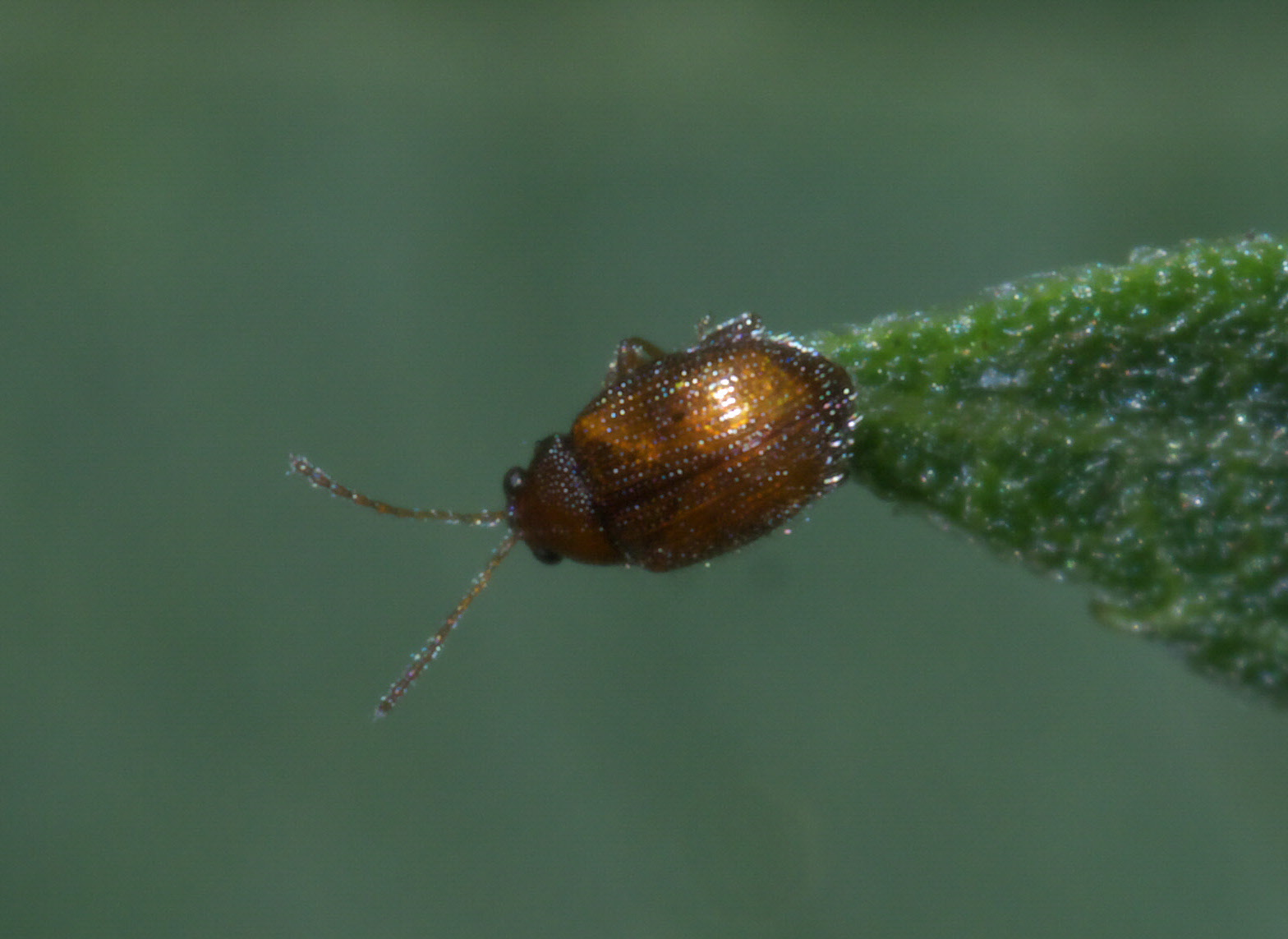
- Epitrix sp.

Scientific classification
- Domain: Eukaryota
- Kingdom: Animalia
- Phylum: Arthropoda
- Class: Insecta
- Order: Coleoptera
- Suborder: Polyphaga
- Infraorder: Cucujiformia
- Family: Chrysomelidae
- Tribe: Alticini
- Genus: Epitrix; Foudras in Mulsant, 1860

Type species
- Epitrix atropae Foudras in Mulsant, 1860

Synonyms
- Epithrix Bedel, 1899; Euplecnema Jacoby, 1906

= Epitrix =

Genus of beetles

Epitrix is a genus of flea beetles in the family Chrysomelidae. There are 162 described species in Epitrix, which occur in all continents except Australia and Antarctica. Many species of the genus are serious pests of potatoes and other plants in the Solanaceae family.

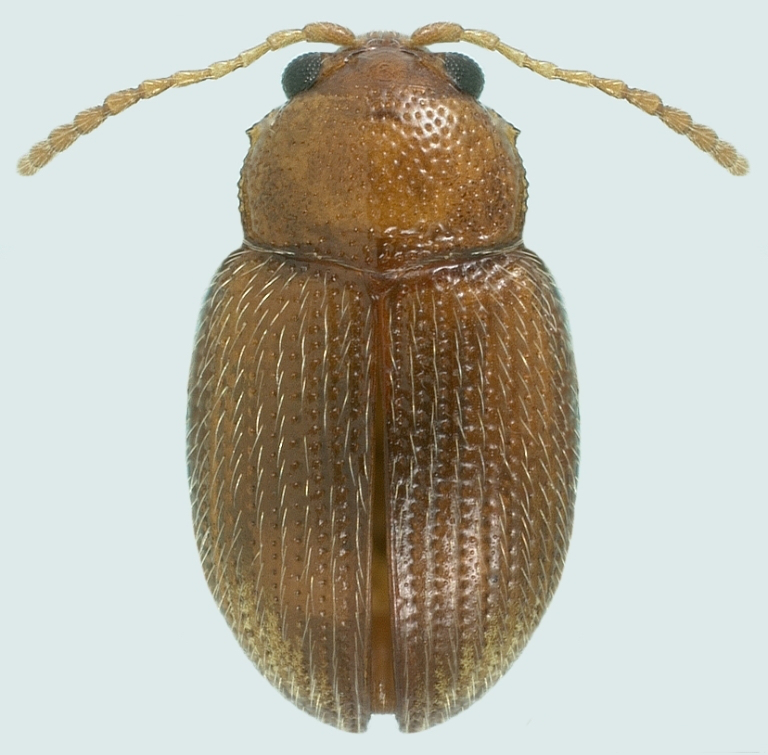
Epitrix hirtipennis

== Species ==
- Epitrix abeillei (Bauduer, 1874)
- Epitrix aeneicollis Jacoby, 1891
- Epitrix aethiopica (Weise, 1910)
  - Epitrix aethiopica aethiopica (Weise, 1910)
  - Epitrix aethiopica major Bechyné, 1960
- Epitrix allardii (Wollaston, 1860)
- Epitrix aloisia Bechyné, 1956
- Epitrix anahoria Bechyné & Springlova de Bechyné, 1960
- Epitrix angelina Bechyné & Springlova de Bechyné, 1960
- Epitrix angostura Bechyné, 1959
- Epitrix apanecana Bechyné & Springlova de Bechyné, 1960
- Epitrix apicicornis Baly, 1876
- Epitrix argentinensis Bryant, 1940
- Epitrix atomaria Weise, 1929
- Epitrix atomarioides Bechyné, 1955
- Epitrix atripes Harold, 1875
  - Epitrix atripes atripes Harold, 1875
  - Epitrix atripes silvicola Bechyné & Springlova de Bechyné, 1960
- Epitrix atropae Foudras, 1860
- Epitrix auricoma Bechyné & Springlova de Bechyné, 1960
- Epitrix bamendaensis Scherer, 1959
- Epitrix beniensis Bechyné, 1959
- Epitrix biscuta Bechyné & Springlova de Bechyné, 1961
  - Epitrix biscuta biscuta Bechyné & Springlova de Bechyné, 1961
  - Epitrix biscuta diluta Bechyné, 1966
- Epitrix brevis Schwarz, 1878
- Epitrix carecuruensis Bechyné & Springlova de Bechyné, 1960
- Epitrix catharina Bechyné, 1955
- Epitrix caucasica (Heikertinger, 1950)
- Epitrix cochabamba Bechyné, 1955
- Epitrix convexa Jacoby, 1885
- Epitrix coroicensis Bechyné, 1955
- Epitrix cucumeris (Harris, 1851) (potato flea beetle)
- Epitrix dalaba Bechyné, 1955
- Epitrix darwini Bryant, 1942
- Epitrix deborah Bechyné, 1955
- Epitrix dieckmanni (Mohr, 1968)
- Epitrix dilaticornis Jacoby, 1885
- Epitrix domenica Bechyné & Springlova de Bechyné, 1961
  - Epitrix domenica domenica Bechyné & Springlova de Bechyné, 1961
  - Epitrix domenica melanopicea Bechyné, 1966
- Epitrix egleri Bechyné & Springlova de Bechyné, 1961
- Epitrix ermischi (Mohr, 1968)
- Epitrix fallada Bechyné, 1955
- Epitrix fasciata Blatchley, 1918 (banded epitrix)
- Epitrix flaveola Harold, 1875
- Epitrix flavotestacea Horn, 1894
- Epitrix forsteri Bechyné, 1959
- Epitrix fulvicornis Jacoby, 1889
- Epitrix fuscata (Jacquelin-Duval, 1857)
- Epitrix fuscula Crotch, 1873 (eggplant flea beetle)
- Epitrix halophila Bechyné & Springlová de Bechyné, 1978
- Epitrix harilana Bechyné, 1997
  - Epitrix harilana harilana Bechyné, 1997
  - Epitrix harilana rubia Bechyné, 1997
- Epitrix haroldi Jacoby, 1885
- Epitrix hepperi Bryant, 1951
- Epitrix hirtipennis (F. E. Melsheimer, 1847) (tobacco flea beetle)
- Epitrix hirtula Harold, 1875
- Epitrix humeralis Dury, 1906
- Epitrix impressa Laboissière, 1942
- Epitrix impressicollis Scherer, 1959
- Epitrix inflatipes Bechyné, 1955
- Epitrix integralis Bechyné & Springlová de Bechyné, 1960
- Epitrix integricollis Jacoby, 1897
- Epitrix intermedia Foudras, 1860
- Epitrix jacobyi Weise, 1929
- Epitrix jariensis Bechyné & Springlová de Bechyné, 1965
- Epitrix jokoensis Bechyné, 1955
- Epitrix krali Döberl, 2000
- Epitrix lacustris Bechyné & Springlová de Bechyné, 1960
- Epitrix laevifrons Weise, 1895
- Epitrix laticollis Scherer, 1960
- Epitrix limonensis Bechyné, 1997
- Epitrix linda Bechyné & Springlová de Bechyné, 1961
- Epitrix lobata Crotch, 1873
- Epitrix lomasa Maulik, 1926
- Epitrix lucidula Harold, 1875
- Epitrix manoria Bechyné & Springlová de Bechyné, 1961
- Epitrix mercuria Bechyné, 1955
- Epitrix metallica Jacoby, 1891
- Epitrix minuta Jacoby, 1885
- Epitrix miraflora Bechyné, 1955
- Epitrix mirifica Scherer, 1960
- Epitrix monochroma Bechyné, 1955
- Epitrix montana Jacoby, 1885
- Epitrix muehlei Döberl, 2000
- Epitrix murina Harold, 1875
- Epitrix nicolina Bechyné & Springlová de Bechyné, 1960
- Epitrix nicotianae Bryant, 1936
- Epitrix nigroaenea Harold, 1875
- Epitrix nigropicta Bryant, 1951
- Epitrix nitens Weise, 1929
- Epitrix ninfa Bechyné & Springlová de Bechyné, 1960
- Epitrix nonsulcata Laboissière, 1942
- Epitrix nucea Baly, 1876
- Epitrix nycteroptera Bechyné & Springlová de Bechyné, 1960
- Epitrix obliterata Jacoby, 1891
- Epitrix ocobamba Bechyné, 1955
- Epitrix ogloblini (Iablokov-Khnzorian, 1960)
- Epitrix opacicollis Harold, 1875
- Epitrix paludicola Champion, 1920
- Epitrix papa Orlova-Bienkowskaja, 2015
- Epitrix parioides Bechyné, 1955
- Epitrix pectoralis Weise, 1929
- Epitrix pellucida Weise, 1921
- Epitrix penta Bechyné & Springlová de Bechyné, 1965
- Epitrix perquinensis Bechyné & Springlova de Bechyné, 1960
- Epitrix pertinax Scherer, 1960
- Epitrix piceomarginata Jacoby, 1891
- Epitrix plaumanni Bechyné, 1955
- Epitrix polyphaga Bechyné, 1997
- Epitrix priesneri (Heikertinger, 1950)
- Epitrix puberula (Boheman, 1859)
- Epitrix pubescens (Koch, 1803)
- Epitrix pubipennis Bryant, 1930
- Epitrix pulchella Jacoby, 1885
- Epitrix pulla Harold, 1875
- Epitrix puncticollis Jacoby, 1885
- Epitrix pygmaea Harold, 1875
- Epitrix quadriplagiata Bryant, 1951
- Epitrix ranquela Bechyné, 1955
  - Epitrix ranquela ranquela Bechyné, 1955
  - Epitrix ranquela gynandra Bechyné, 1959
  - Epitrix ranquela insuavis Bechyné, 1997
  - Epitrix ranquela aliena Bechyné & Springlová de Bechyné, 1961
- Epitrix riobrancoensis Scherer, 1960
- Epitrix robusta Jacoby, 1891
- Epitrix ruderalis Bechyné & Springlová de Bechyné, 1978
- Epitrix rufula Weise, 1929
- Epitrix rugipleura Bechyné & Springlová de Bechyné, 1978
- Epitrix salomona Bechyné, 1955
- Epitrix scenica Bechyné, 1955
- Epitrix sejuncta Baly, 1876
- Epitrix sensitiva Bechyné & Springlová de Bechyné, 1978
- Epitrix serratula Baly, 1876
- Epitrix setosella (Fairmaire, 1888)
- Epitrix similaris Gentner, 1944
- Epitrix simplex Weise, 1921
- Epitrix solani (Blatchley, 1925)
- Epitrix spyria Bechyné, 1955
- Epitrix suavis Bechyné, 1955
- Epitrix subcostata Jacoby, 1885
- Epitrix subcrinita (J. L. LeConte, 1857) (western potato flea beetle)
- Epitrix subfusca Jacoby, 1897
- Epitrix subglabrata Jacoby, 1885
- Epitrix subtilis Harold, 1875
- Epitrix subvestita Baly, 1876
- Epitrix subviolacea Bechyné & Springlová de Bechyné, 1978
- Epitrix sylvicola Bryant, 1953
- Epitrix tantula Harold, 1875
- Epitrix thoracica Jacoby, 1885
- Epitrix thoracolysa Bechyné & Springlová de Bechyné, 1960
- Epitrix tincticollis Weise, 1929
- Epitrix torrida Baly, 1876
- Epitrix torvi Bryant, 1936
- Epitrix tovarensis Bechyné, 1997
  - Epitrix tovarensis tovarensis Bechyné, 1997
  - Epitrix tovarensis meridensis Bechyné, 1997
- Epitrix trapezophora Bechyné & Springlová de Bechyné, 1978
- Epitrix triangularis Bechyné & Springlová de Bechyné, 1960
- Epitrix trichogramma Bechyné, 1997
- Epitrix tuberis Gentner, 1944 (tuber flea beetle)
- Epitrix tucumanensis Bechyné, 1955
- Epitrix ubaquensis Harold, 1875
  - Epitrix ubaquensis ubaquensis Harold, 1875
  - Epitrix ubaquensis venezuelensis Jacoby, 1889
- Epitrix uruguayica Bryant, 1942
- Epitrix vestita (Boheman, 1859)
- Epitrix victoria Bechyné, 1955
- Epitrix villosa Harold, 1876
- Epitrix vincentina Bechyné & Springlová de Bechyné, 1960
- Epitrix violacea Jacoby, 1885
- Epitrix virgulata Harold, 1875
- Epitrix warchalowskii (Mohr, 1968)
- Epitrix weisei Jacoby, 1897
- Epitrix weyrauchi Bechyné, 1959
- Epitrix wittmeri Bechyné, 1955
- Epitrix yanazara Bechyné, 1959
- Epitrix yungarum Bechyné, 1955
