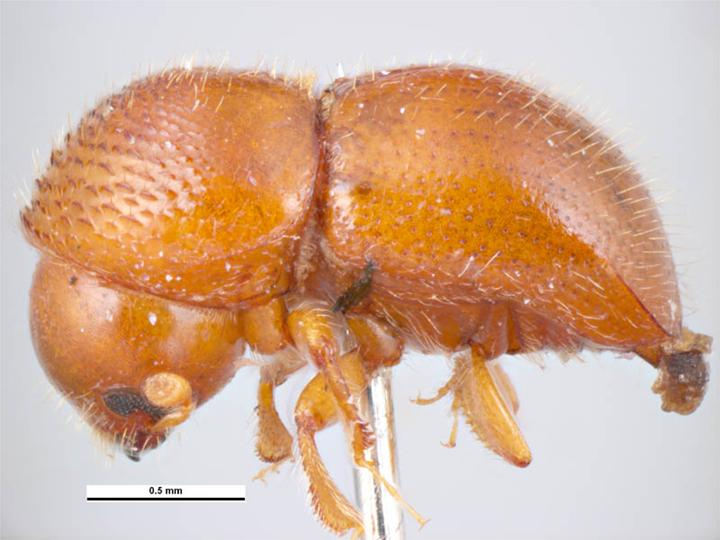

Scientific classification
- Kingdom: Animalia
- Phylum: Arthropoda
- Clade: Pancrustacea
- Class: Insecta
- Order: Coleoptera
- Suborder: Polyphaga
- Infraorder: Cucujiformia
- Superfamily: Curculionoidea
- Family: Curculionidae
- Genus: Xylosandrus
- Species: X. morigerus

Binomial name
- Xylosandrus morigerus (Blanford, 1894)

Synonyms
- Xyleborus morigerus Blanford, 1894; Xylosandrus morigerus (Blanford): Reitter, 1913; Xyleborus coffeae Wurth, 1908; Xyleborus luzonicus Eggers, 1923; Xylosandrus luzonicus (Eggers): Browne, 1963; Xyleborus difficilis Eggers, 1923; Xylosandrus difficilis (Eggers): Browne, 1963; Xyleborus abruptoides Schedl, 1955; Xylosandrus abruptoides (Schedl): Browne, 1963

= Xylosandrus morigerus =

Species of beetle

Xylosandrus morigerus is a species of weevil widespread throughout Afrotropical, Australian, Neotropical, Oceania and Oriental regions. It is also introduced to Palearctic regional countries.

== Distribution ==
It is native to Gabon, Madagascar, Mauritius, Zaire, Australia, New Guinea, Solomon Islands, India, Sri Lanka, Indonesia, Malaysian Peninsula, Philippines, Taiwan, Vietnam, Brazil, Colombia, Costa Rica, Galapagos Islands, Honduras, Mexico, Panama, Puerto Rico, Tobago, Venezuela, Fiji islands, Hawaii, Micronesia, Samoa, and Tonga. It is also found in Austria, Czech republic, United Kingdom, France, Italy, Jordan and Lebanon as an exotic species.

== Description ==
Body length of the female ranges from 1.5 to 2.0 mm. Body light to dark brown. Antennae and legs are yellowish brown. Antennea with 5 funicular segments and obliquely truncate club. Pronotal vestiture is semi-appressed and with hairy setae. Pronotal base covered with a dense patch of short erect setae that resemble a pronotal-mesonotal mycangium. Pronotal disc is moderately punctate. Pronotum consists with lateral costa and carina. Protibiae with 4 socketed teeth, whereas mesotibiae with 8 to 10 and metatibiae with 10 socketed teeth. In elytra, discal striae and interstriae uniseriate are punctate. Declivital elytral face is convex, steep and abruptly separated from disc.

== Biology ==
The species shows successful inbreeding. Mating occurs between siblings and before dispersal, which assures successful insemination of most dispersing females. Females that are not inseminated by a brother called haplodiploid, can potentially mate with a haploid son produced from unfertilized eggs before leaving the nest. The genetic variation suggests that outbreeding is extremely rare in the species.

A polyphagous species, it is found in many plants. It shows a tight symbiosis with ambrosia fungi such as Ambrosiella and occasionally other imperfect ascomycete fungi.

=== Host plants ===
- Acacia gaumeri
- Acalypha
- Actinophora fragrans
- Adenanthera pavonina
- Albizia glauca
- Albizia procera
- Alseis yucatanensis
- Altingia excelsa
- Arthrophyllum diversifolium
- Amomum
- Aspidosperma
- Astronium graveolens
- Bixa orellana
- Boehmeria
- Bridelia
- Brosimum alicastrum
- Bursera simaruba
- Butea monosperma
- Calamus caesius
- Calophyllum brasiliense
- Camellia sinensis
- Cassia multijuga
- Castanea argentea
- Castanopsis
- Cattleya
- Cedrela odorata
- Cecropia obtusifolia
- Ceiba pentandra
- Centrosema plumieri
- Chrysophyllum cainito
- Cinchona
- Claoxylon polot
- Clidemia hirta
- Cocos nucifera
- Coffea arabica
- Coffea excelsa
- Coffea liberica
- Cola acuminata
- Cordia dodecandra
- Crotalaria anagyroides
- Crotalaria usaramoensis
- Dalbergia latifolia
- Dendrobium phalaenopsis
- Dendrobium superbum
- Dendrobium veratrifolium
- Derris microphylla
- Didymopanax
- Dryobalanops oblongifolia
- Endospermum diadenum
- Epidendrum stamfordianum
- Erythrina lithosperma
- Erythroxylum novogranatense
- Esenbeckia pentaphylla
- Eupatorium pallescens
- Eusideroxylon zwageri
- Falcataria moluccana
- Ficus ampelos
- Flemingia strobilifera
- Freycinetia hombroni
- Fuchsia
- Glochidion
- Grewia laevigata
- Gynotroches onilaris
- Hevea brasiliensis
- Intsia palembanica
- Lecythis
- Leucaena glauca
- Licania hypoleuca
- Lonicera caprifolium
- Macaranga
- Machaerium cirrhiferum
- Marumia muscosa
- Melia azedarach
- Miconia trinervia
- Mitrella kentii
- Ochroma lagopus
- Persea gratissima
- Phalaenopsis
- Pometia pinnata
- Pouteria sapota
- Quararibea
- Renanthera storiei
- Rubroshorea leprosula
- Sambucus javanica
- Schizolobium parahyba
- Schleichera oleosa
- Serjania
- Spondias mombin
- Swietenia macrophylla
- Swietenia mahagoni
- Syzygium polyanthum
- Tabebuia rosea
- Tarenna incerta
- Tectona grandis
- Tephrosia maxima
- Tephrosia vogelii
- Thea sinensis
- Theobroma cacao
- Terminalia amazonia
- Trema micrantha
- Trema orientalis
- Vanda coerulea
- Vanda teres
- Vanda tricolor
- Vitis
