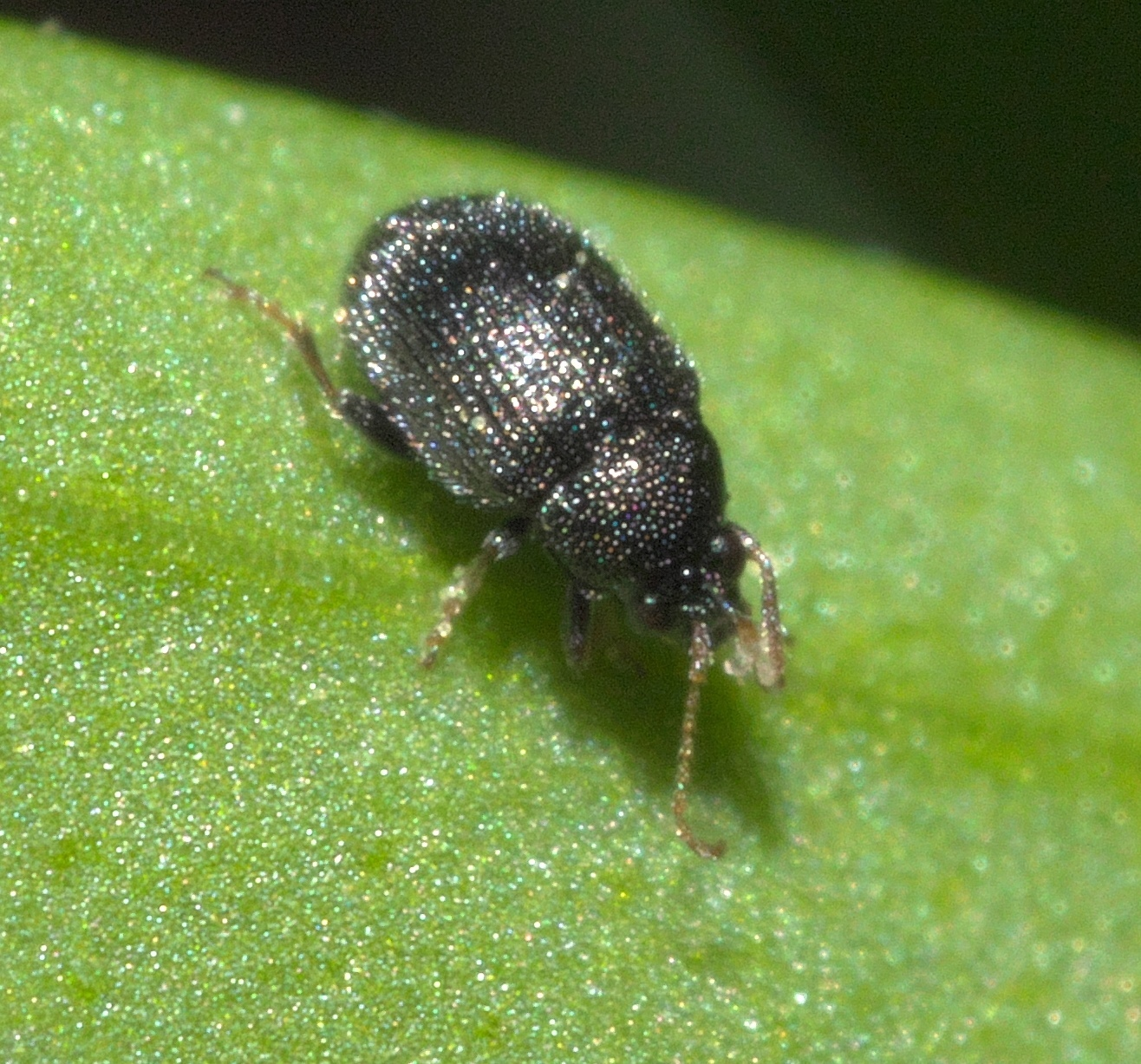
- Epitrix fuscula, Oklahoma

Scientific classification
- Kingdom: Animalia
- Phylum: Arthropoda
- Class: Insecta
- Order: Coleoptera
- Suborder: Polyphaga
- Infraorder: Cucujiformia
- Family: Chrysomelidae
- Tribe: Alticini
- Genus: Epitrix
- Species: E. fuscula

Binomial name
- Epitrix fuscula Crotch, 1873

= Epitrix fuscula =

Species of beetle

Epitrix fuscula, the eggplant flea beetle, is a species of flea beetle in the family Chrysomelidae. It is found in North America.
