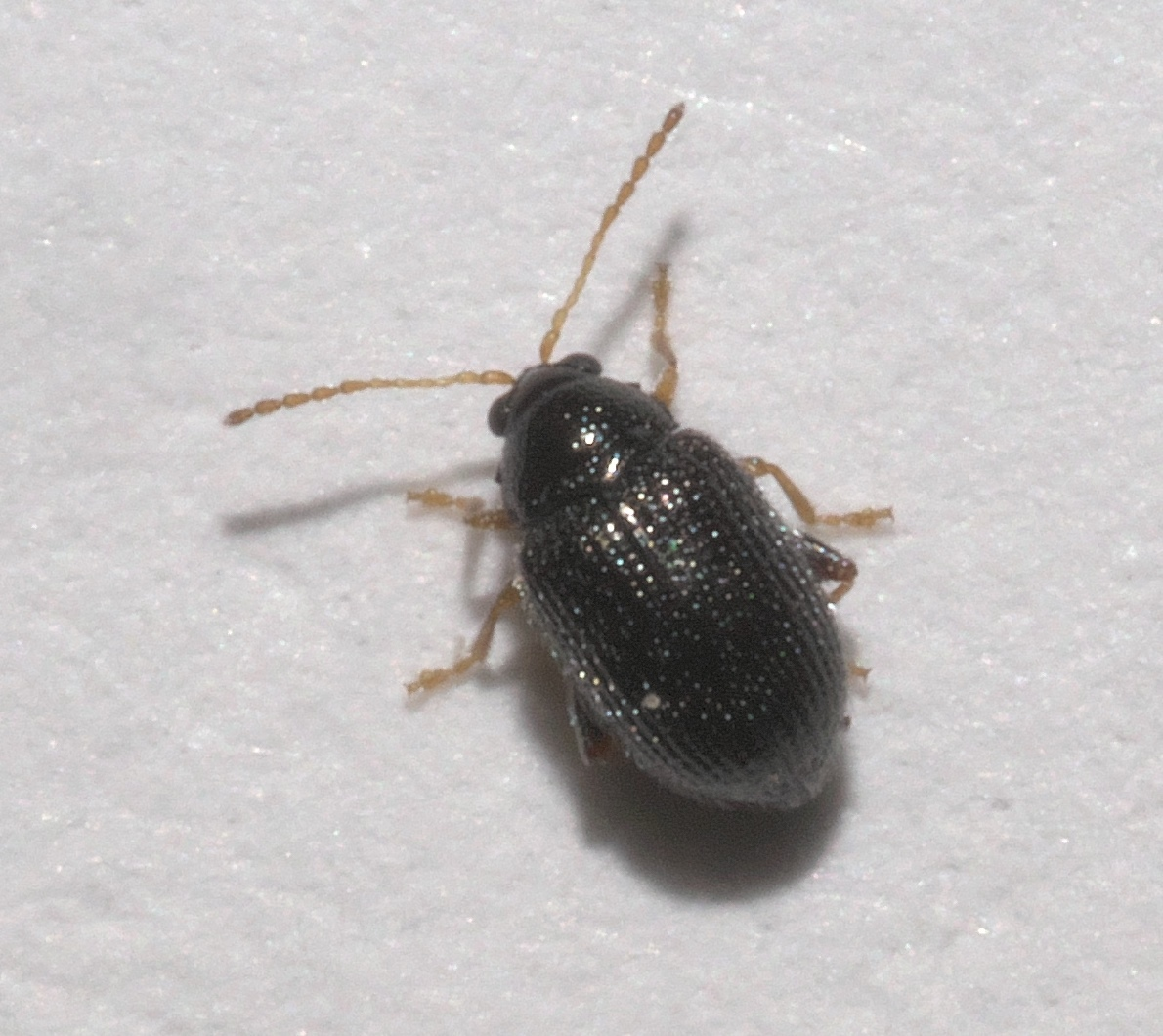
- Epitrix cucumeris, Oklahoma

Scientific classification
- Kingdom: Animalia
- Phylum: Arthropoda
- Class: Insecta
- Order: Coleoptera
- Suborder: Polyphaga
- Infraorder: Cucujiformia
- Family: Chrysomelidae
- Tribe: Alticini
- Genus: Epitrix
- Species: E. cucumeris

Binomial name
- Epitrix cucumeris (Harris, 1851)

Synonyms
- Haltica cucumeris Harris, 1851; Haltica seminulum LeConte, 1861

= Epitrix cucumeris =

Species of beetle

Epitrix cucumeris, the potato flea beetle, is a species of flea beetle in the family Chrysomelidae. It is a major pest of potatoes in North America.

== Distribution ==
It is native to North America and occurs widely in the Americas; it has also been introduced to the Azores and the continental Europe (Portugal and Spain).

== Description ==
Epitrix cucumeris is a small oval and convex beetle measuring 1.5–2 mm (0.059–0.079 in) in length. It is difficult to distinguish from many other Epitrix without detailed examination.

== As a pest ==
It is a major pest of potatoes in North America, mostly damaging the foliage as adults. The larvae can sometimes damage the tubers. It can also feed on many other Solanaceae species.
