= Antrocaryon =

Scientific classification
- Kingdom: Plantae
- Clade: Tracheophytes
- Clade: Angiosperms
- Clade: Eudicots
- Clade: Rosids
- Order: Sapindales
- Family: Anacardiaceae
- Subfamily: Spondiadoideae
- Genus: Antrocaryon; Pierre, 1898

Genus of flowering plants

Antrocaryon is a genus of flowering plants in the cashew family, Anacardiaceae. The genus is disjunct between Tropical West Africa to Uganda (4 species) and northern Brazil (1 species).

== Taxonomy ==
=== Species ===
Species include:

- Antrocaryon amazonicum (Ducke) B.L.Burtt & A.W.Hill
- Antrocaryon klaineanum Pierre
- Antrocaryon micraster A.Chev. & Guillaumin
- Antrocaryon nannanii De Wild.
- Antrocaryon schorkopfii Engl.
