= Hopea wightiana =

Hopea wightiana is a taxon synonym for two species of flowering plants:

- Hopea wightiana Wall. ex Wight & Arn., synonym of Hopea ponga var. ponga
- Hopea wightiana Miq. ex Dyer, synonym of Hopea odorata Roxb.
