= Epitrix tuberis =

Scientific classification
- Kingdom: Animalia
- Phylum: Arthropoda
- Clade: Pancrustacea
- Class: Insecta
- Order: Coleoptera
- Suborder: Polyphaga
- Infraorder: Cucujiformia
- Family: Chrysomelidae
- Genus: Epitrix
- Species: E. tuberis

Binomial name
- Epitrix tuberis Gentner, 1944

Species of flea beetle

Epitrix tuberis, the tuber flea beetle, is a species of flea beetle in the family Chrysomelidae. It is found in North America.

== Introduction ==
Epitrix tuberis, known as the tubular flea beetle, is a part of the Epitrix genus that comprises 162 described species. E. tuberis is native to Colorado (USA) and widely distributed to parts of the US and Canada. It is also expanding to South America countries like Costa Rica and Ecuador due to the development of the potato industry. The species was once considered as the E. cumeris species due to morphological similarities but has become identified as its own new species in 1944 by Gentner. In North America, E. tuberis is identified as the most damaging species out of all five Epitrix species associated with the potato plant (Solanum tuberosum) - E. cucumeris (potato flea beetle), E. hirtipennis (tobacco flea beetle), E. similaris (no common name), and E. subcrinita (western potato flea beetle). The larvae of E. tuberis have been found to be the major cause of damage to potato plant leaves.

== Morphological identification ==
All Epitrix species are morphologically similar, making them difficult to differentiate. Identification of species is mostly based on the observation of the genitalia of both sexes and habitus of the insect which requires a high level of expertise to identify them. Typical morphology of the Epitrix tuberis includes sizes that range from 1.5 to 2.0 mm long. Typical coloration is dull black to reddish-black with brown to yellow antennae and short white hairs across the elytra, and legs that are reddish with lighter tarsi. Their hind femurs are expanded as an adaptation to jumping.

Molecular Techniques have been leveraged to aid in the identification of metamorphic stages in E. tuberis (DNA barcoding on cytochrome c oxidase subunit I (COI) gene). The reference sequences of these species are available in EPPO-Q-bank and BOLD databases. Fast and accurate detection of the species enables the study of potential threats of this species to the environment and helps with management strategies.

The adult E.Tuberis does fly for very long distances in order to find a host plant but prefers to jump. The species doesn't fly if the speed of the wind exceeds 3 m/s, and there is seen to be little to no flight before midday. This species can be detected in foliage and when approached they jump, however on windy days they aren't active.

== Life cycle ==
Epitrix tuberis adults spend the winter in the soil near the harvested potato field to feed and mate. After a pre-oviposition period of 5–8 days, Females of Epitrix species enter the ground near potato plants and lay their eggs close to the stem of the potato plant. After 3–4 days of incubation, the eggs of E. tuberis hatch, and the larvae feed on roots and tubers for 2–4 weeks. When fully grown, they build up the pupation chamber to metamorphosize into adults. E. tuberis completes two life cycles per year depending on the climate conditions. The first generation develops in early-planted potatoes and the second generation of larvae develops in late-planted potatoes. Adults of the overwintered generation usually die in July which overlaps with the emergence of a new generation between July and early September.

== As an invasive species ==
Notably, the potato plant (Solanum tuberosum) is the main host of E. tuberis. The E. tuberis causes significant damage to potato tubers; the adults feed on the leaves, and the larvae feed on the roots and the tuber. Consequently, larvae feed on tubers to create small brown tunnels in the tuber. Meanwhile, an adult will create a hole in the leaves approximately 1.0 - 1.5 mm wide. Potatoes are the most significantly affected host, but if not available, the flea beetle will damage aubergine (Solanum melongena), Chinese lantern, ground cherry, tomato (solanum lycopersicum), and tobacco.

== Economic impact ==
The feeding of E. tuberis larvae on the potato tuber is superficial and does not affect the tuber quality. However, the visual impact of tunnels on the tuber affects trade markets and a commercial downgrade for potato distributors. It only takes one or two larvae to cause enough significant damage to reject the tuber. For example, in 1904, E. tuberis larvae caused a loss of $250,000 in potatoes in Colorado. A larger quantity of E. tuberis populations are found in non rotated fields than in fields that are rotated often. One beetle found in one of ten plants is the threshold to take action in preventative treatment against E. tuberis.

== Preventing their spread ==
An international spread might happen if any adult E. tuberis are moved with rooted host plants or if there is any eggs or pupae present in the soil that are being transported along with the plant. Farmers start a crop rotation (minimum of 3 years) to prevent a build-up of E. tuberis in the middle of fields.

As soon as the potato plant leaves are grown, the crops are monitored once a week until harvested. An inspection for E. tuberis should be done on plants below 30 cm in height by crawling to inspect the roots and leaves for the beetle. Plants above 30 cm in height are inspected by a Sweep-Net Method. A Sweep-Net method is when a long net is used to catch flying insects in the 15 inches in diameter opening of the net, to then be identified. In addition, the removal of Solanaceous weeds is crucial. E. tuberis overwinter along field edges where they can hide on Solanaceous weeds

Along with this, they may want to look into not growing early potato varieties, which will make the overwintered adults have to feed on fewer food plants which may decrease the number of the first-generation larvae.
