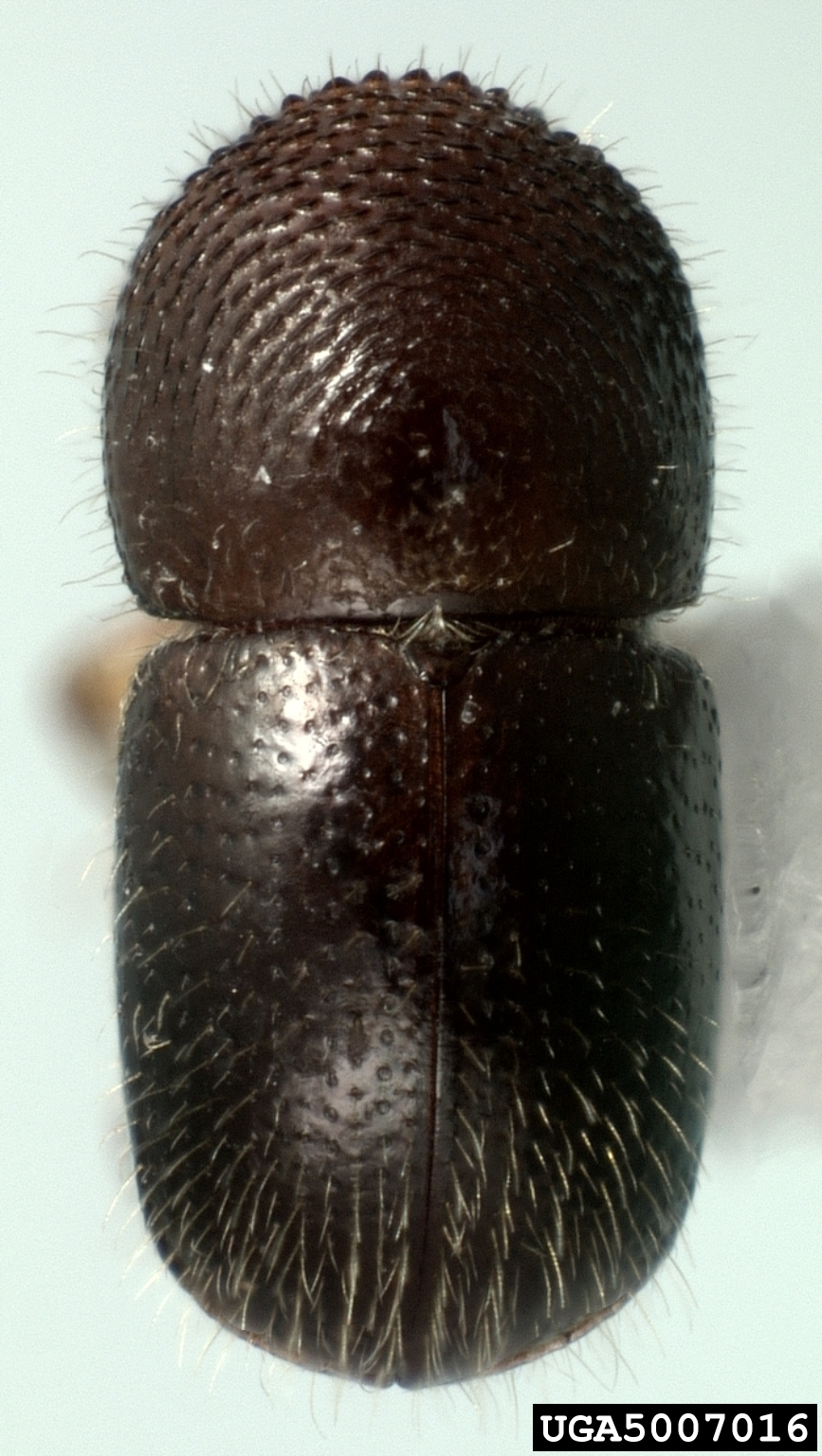
- An adult Xylosandrus compactus

Scientific classification
- Kingdom: Animalia
- Phylum: Arthropoda
- Clade: Pancrustacea
- Class: Insecta
- Order: Coleoptera
- Suborder: Polyphaga
- Infraorder: Cucujiformia
- Superfamily: Curculionoidea
- Family: Curculionidae
- Subfamily: Scolytinae
- Genus: Xylosandrus
- Species: X. compactus

Binomial name
- Xylosandrus compactus (Eichhoff, 1875)

Synonyms
- Xyleborus compactus; Xyleborus morstatti

= Xylosandrus compactus =

Species of beetle

Xylosandrus compactus is a species of ambrosia beetle. Common names for this beetle include black twig borer, black coffee borer, black coffee twig borer and tea stem borer. The adult beetle is dark brown or black and inconspicuous; it bores into a twig of a host plant and lays its eggs, and the larvae create further tunnels through the plant tissues. These beetles are agricultural pests that damage the shoots of such crops as coffee, tea, cocoa and avocado.

== Description ==
This beetle is dark brown or black. The adult female is up to 2 mm (0.08 in) long and about half as wide. The head is convex at the front with an indistinct transverse groove above the mouthparts. Each antenna consists of a funicle (base) with five segments and an obliquely truncated club slightly longer than it is wide. The pronotum is rounded with six or eight serrations on the front edge. The elytra are convex and grooved and have fine perforations, and there are bristles between the grooves. The adult male is a smaller insect, has an unserrated pronotum and no wings.

The eggs are smooth, white and ovoid, about 0.5 mm (0.02 in) long. The larvae are creamy white with brownish heads and have no legs. The pupae are cream-coloured and exarate (with free appendages).

== Distribution ==
Xylosandrus compactus has a wide distribution in the tropics. Its range extends from Madagascar and much of tropical Africa, through Sri Lanka and southern India, Thailand, Vietnam, Malaysia, China and Japan to Indonesia, New Guinea and various islands in the Pacific. It was introduced into the continental United States in 1941 and has also spread to Brazil and Cuba. It arrived in Hawaii in 1961, and here it infests over one hundred species of timber trees, fruit trees, ornamental trees and fruit bushes. Its presence in Hawaii is putting some rare and threatened endemic trees such as Alectryon macrococcus, Colubrina oppositifolia, Caesalpinia kavaiensis, and Flueggea neowawraea, at risk.

In 2011, Xylosandrus compactus was first detected in Europe in Portici and Naples, likely introduced through the international trade of nursery plants. Since then, within a few years, it has spread along the Tyrrhenian coast (2012 in Tuscany and Liguria, 2016 in Lazio and Sicily), subsequently reaching the northern inland areas (2015 in Lombardy), and finally the Adriatic coast (2018 in Emilia-Romagna, 2019 in Veneto). In 2015, the species expanded from Liguria to France (French Riviera), and in 2019 it was recorded in Spain (Mallorca, Balearic Islands) on a carob tree, which was promptly treated in an attempt to eradicate the beetle. In July of the same year, X. compactus was also found in southern Greece infesting carob, laurel, olive, Judas tree, and shrubs of the genus Rhamnus, thereby becoming a concern at the European level. By 2025, it had become invasive in Perth, Western Australia.

== Hosts ==
Some 225 species of plants in 62 families have been recorded as acting as hosts for this beetle. In a natural broad-leafed forest it does not normally cause much damage, but when it infects plantations of susceptible host plants it may become a pest. Major crops where it does serious damage are coffee, tea, avocado and cocoa. In India it attacks Khaya grandifoliola and Khaya senegalensis, which are grown as shade trees in plantations, and similarly in Africa it attacks Erythrina sp. and Melia azedarach. It is particularly damaging in tree nurseries, killing seedlings and young saplings. A study in Uganda's shaded robusta coffee systems, tree species suppressing X. compactus infestation characteristically exuded copious sap regardless of any stress. Therefore, the presence or absence of copious sap exuding from trees upon injury likely differentiates X. compactus hosts from non-hosts.

== Ecology ==
In Florida, where X. compactus has been introduced, the life cycle is completed in about twenty-eight days. Like other ambrosia beetles, the adult female carries fungal symbionts, particularly Ambrosiella xylebori and Fusarium species. These fungi colonize the xylem tissue of the plant host, and are consumed by the adult beetles and larvae. Male larvae are produced from unfertilised eggs and are few in number; they remain in the gallery and eventually mate with their sisters. After pupation, the newly emerged female beetles remain in the tunnels for about eight days, and mating takes place here. They then crawl out of the tunnels and fly to another host tree, carrying some of the fungus with them. Here they tunnel into sound wood on the underside of the branch, introduce the fungus and start laying eggs. The females live for about forty days; symptoms of the infestation of a twig include the death of the stem and leaves beyond the tunnel entrance.
