= Antrocaryon micraster =

Conservation status
- Vulnerable (IUCN 2.3)

Scientific classification
- Kingdom: Plantae
- Clade: Tracheophytes
- Clade: Angiosperms
- Clade: Eudicots
- Clade: Rosids
- Order: Sapindales
- Family: Anacardiaceae
- Genus: Antrocaryon
- Species: A. micraster

Binomial name
- Antrocaryon micraster A.Chev. & Guillaumin

Species of tree

Antrocaryon micraster is a species of flowering plant in the cashew family, Anacardiaceae. It is native to tropical Africa, where it occurs in Cameroon, the Democratic Republic of the Congo, Ivory Coast, Ghana, Nigeria, Sierra Leone, and Uganda. It grows in gaps in the forest canopy. It is harvested for its wood.
