= Buchanania sessilifolia =

Scientific classification
- Kingdom: Plantae
- Clade: Tracheophytes
- Clade: Angiosperms
- Clade: Eudicots
- Clade: Rosids
- Order: Sapindales
- Family: Anacardiaceae
- Genus: Buchanania
- Species: B. sessilifolia

Binomial name
- Buchanania sessilifolia Blume

Species of tree

Buchanania sessilifolia is a tree in the family Anacardiaceae. The specific epithet sessilifolia is from the Latin meaning 'leaf without stalk', referring to the sessile leaves.

== Description ==
Buchanania sessilifolia grows as a tree up to 20 metres (70 ft) tall with a trunk diameter of up to 30 cm (12 in). Its smooth bark is grey-brown. The flowers are whitish. The subcordate fruits measure up to 1.3 cm (0.5 in) long.

== Distribution and habitat ==
Buchanania sessilifolia grows naturally in Laos, Thailand, Sumatra, Peninsular Malaysia and Borneo. Its habitat is lowland forests from sea-level to 100 m (300 ft) altitude.
