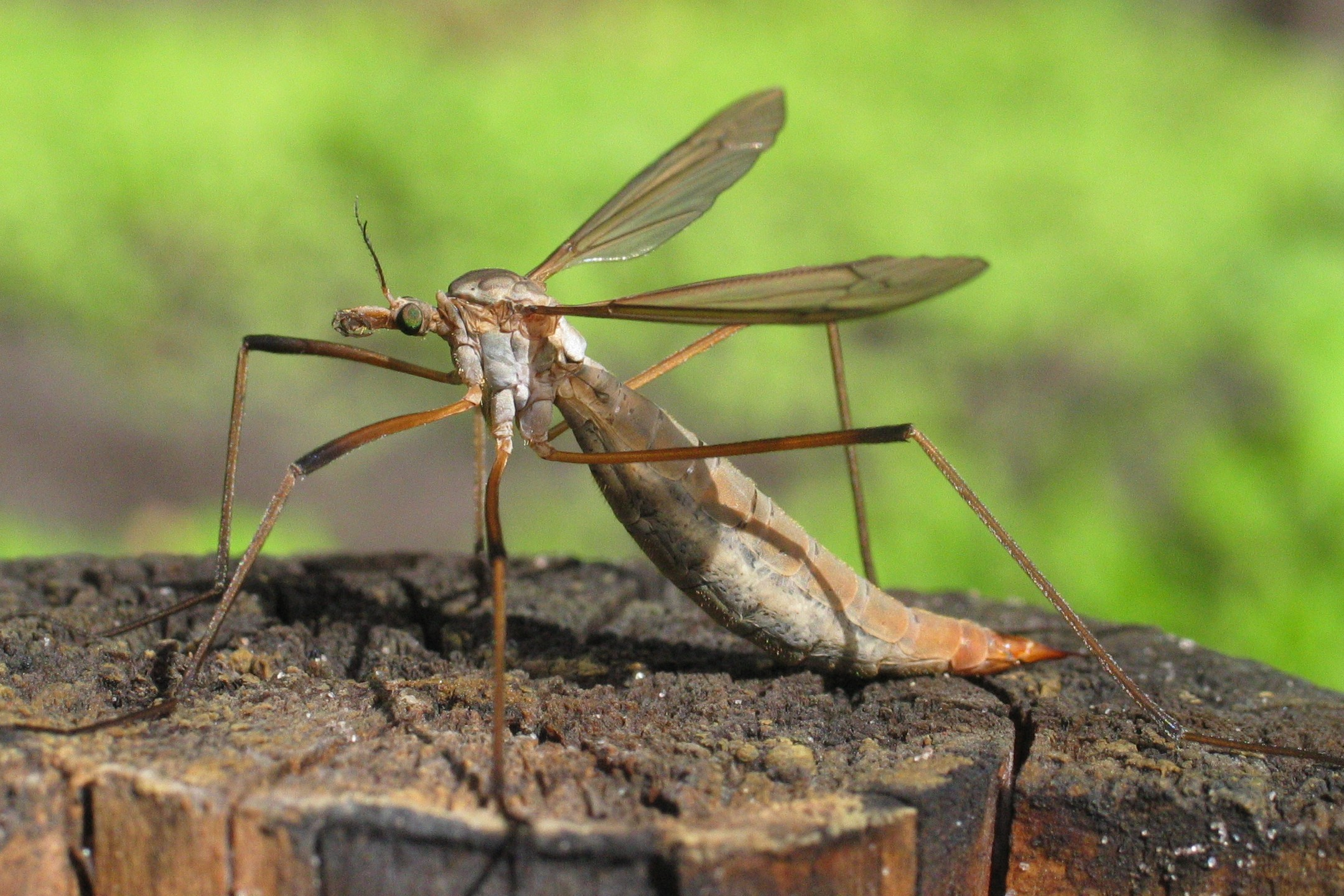
- Tipula paludosa female

Scientific classification
- Kingdom: Animalia
- Phylum: Arthropoda
- Clade: Pancrustacea
- Class: Insecta
- Order: Diptera
- Family: Tipulidae
- Genus: Tipula
- Subgenus: Tipula
- Species: T. paludosa

Binomial name
- Tipula paludosa Meigen, 1830

= Tipula paludosa =

Species of fly

Tipula paludosa, known as the European crane fly and its larva as leatherjacket, is a species in the genus Tipula, a genus of over 2,000 species distributed throughout the world. T. paludosa is native to northwestern Europe including Britain and Ireland, and also introduced to the northern aspects of North America, including Canada likely due to soil dispersion and other human-mediated activities. T. paludosa is often regarded as a pest of lawns, pastures, and hayfields, as its larvae cause significant damage to the roots, stems, and leaves of various plants, contributing to its invasiveness.

== Morphological identification ==
Tipula paludosa, at the adult stage, have greyish-brown bodies that are 1.5–2.5 cm long, with long, thin legs. Males have shorter bodies and large wings. The pupae are 3.0–3.5 cm long, with the mature being slightly larger at 3–4 cm. Females can lay about 200–300 eggs, which appear egg-shaped, are shiny black, and are about 1 mm long. Ventral spacing between the eyes of T. paludosa is twice the width in males and females compared to other species of Tipula. T. paludosa has 14 antennal segments for both males and females. The female abdominal length ratio is a distinguishable characteristic of T. paludosa. Wing size in T. paludosa females is shorter than the abdomen. T. paludosa larvae have an elongated, cylindrical body with a shortened rear. The larvae have 13 segments and spiracles on the last segment. Larvae have the nickname leatherjackets because of their tough skin.

== Life cycle ==
The life cycle of Tipula paludosa follows a seasonal pattern. The larvae hatch in mid-September and initially remain on the soil surface before moving deeper into the thatch and upper soil layers as they mature. During the winter, they remain underground and as the weather becomes warmer, they feed. Their feeding increases in spring. The larvae are an important food source for many birds, including crows. By mid-May, the larvae stop feeding, and enter a nonfeeding stage in June and go just below the soil surface, where they remain throughout the summer. In late August, the larvae pupate, and soon after, the adult crane flies emerge, and mate almost immediately. They then lay eggs in moist soil within 24 hours of emerging, which begins the cycle again. While the adult flies do not feed and have a lifespan of only about two weeks, their larvae are a serious ecological and economical threat to lawns, pastures, and crops.

== Invasiveness ==
Tipula paludosa was introduced to Newfoundland around the 1880s, later identified in 1955 in northern Nova Scotia, and it was reported on cabbage transplants and turnip seedling in Newfoundland. The European crane fly was identified in the western coast of British Columbia in 1965. In 1980 - 1981, there was a major outbreak in Washington state. In 1998, it was identified in Ontario, in 2004 it was detected in New York. The European crane fly was listed as a primary target of the Cooperative Agricultural Pest Survey in 2004 and 2005. The accidental introduction of T. paludosa was the movement of infected soil media.

T. paludosa is considered invasive because of the way it causes damage to lawn, pastures, and hay fields. It does this by feeding on clover and grass species. The European crane fly can also feed on beet, potato, corn and other vegetable crops, ornamental and nursery trees. The most susceptible to invasion are young plants, as they can be chewed at the soil line. The lack of effective natural predators and parasites in North America contributes to its invasiveness. Even though there are some birds and insects that eat the larvae, it is not enough to be able to control the population.

== Ecological role and economic impact ==
T. paludosa is a major agricultural pest. It is most known for its larvae that cause damage to lawns, pastures, and hayfields by feeding on the roots, stems, and leaves of grasses and legumes. The larvae feed on all turf and forage grass species, as well as cereal crops. It has been found that they are a serious threat to seedling nurseries, as they damage both bare root and container stock due to chewing the stems at the soil line. In Oregon, the larvae have caused damage to peppermint, grass seed fields, winter wheat, and turnips.

The economic impact of T. paludosa is harsh. In Northern Ireland, the damage that has occurred to forage grasses was more than £15 million per year. It was found that crop yields increase by approximately 74% when larvae are controlled. The larvae also cause damage as they attract birds like crows, which tear up turf while feeding on them.

Historical outbreaks have shown how large of a problem that the larvae cause. In British Columbia, one farm lost almost 4.0 ha (10 acres) of pasture grass due to an infestation of approximately 4.5 million larvae per acre. A major outbreak in the Seattle area during 1980-81 caused destruction of lawns, fairways, and golf greens, which helped establish the pest's presence in western Washington.

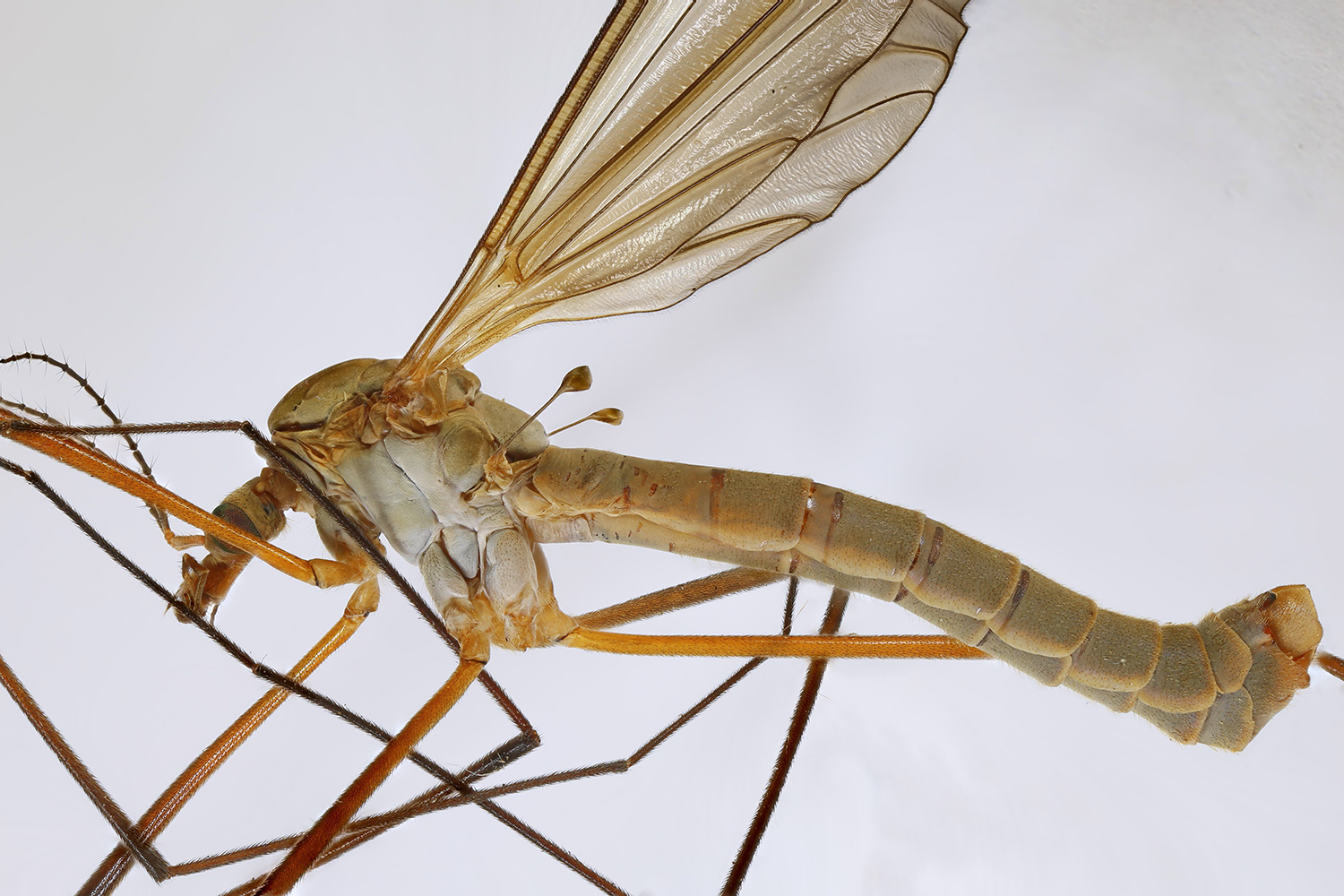
Tipula paludosa male

== See also ==
- List of Tipula species
