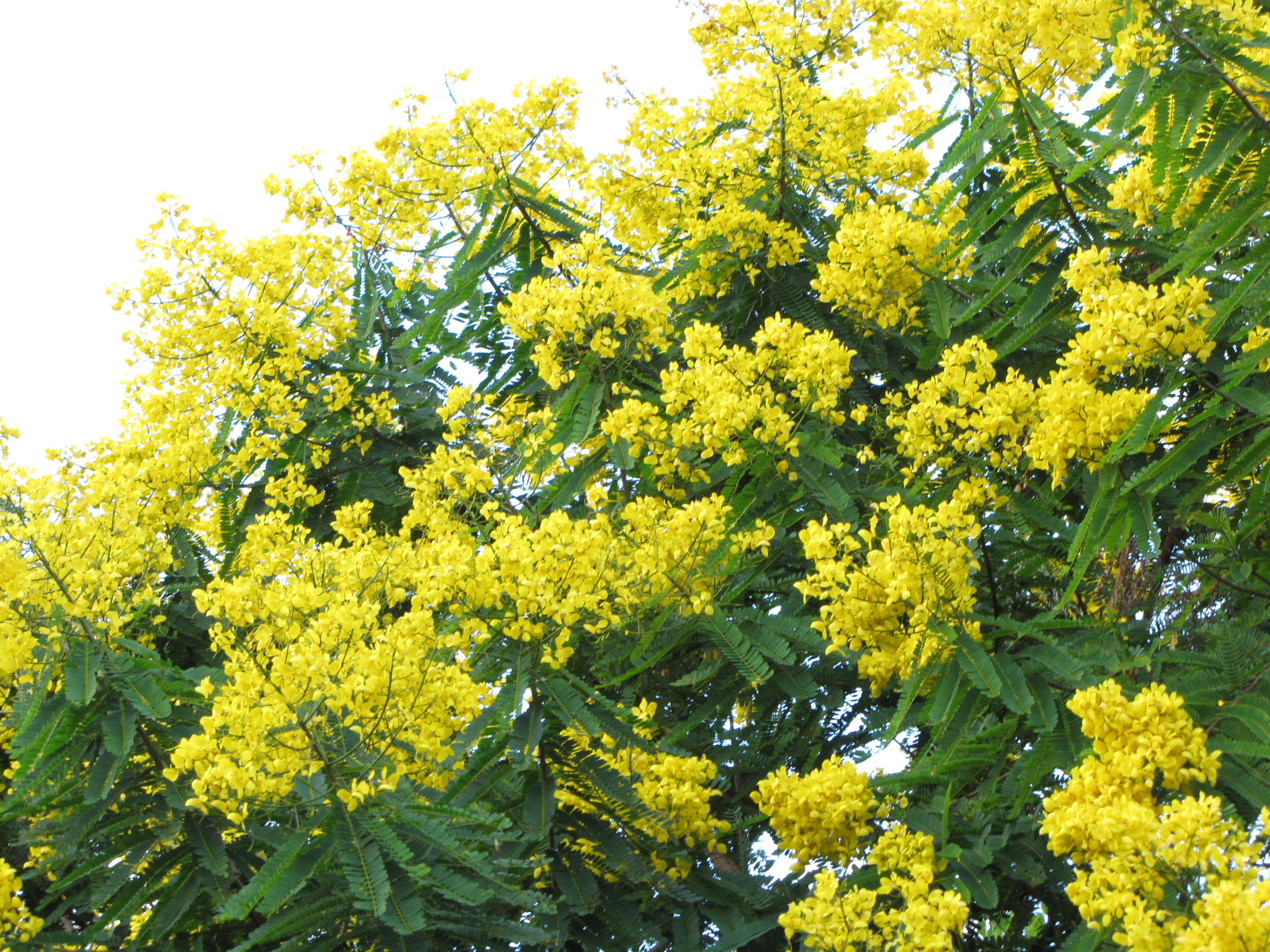
- In Hawaii
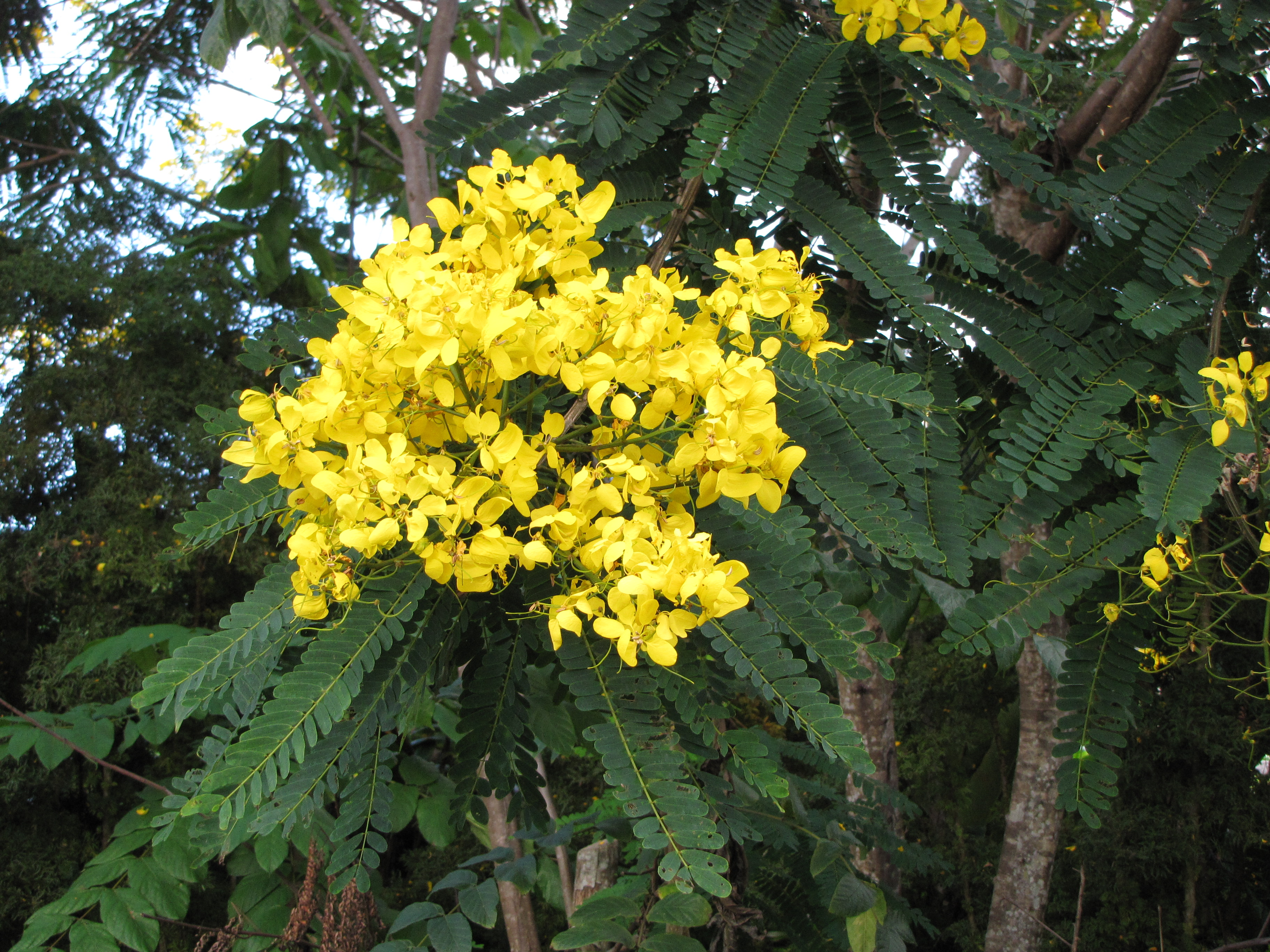
- Flowers and leaves

Conservation status
- Least Concern (IUCN 3.1)

Scientific classification
- Kingdom: Plantae
- Clade: Tracheophytes
- Clade: Angiosperms
- Clade: Eudicots
- Clade: Rosids
- Order: Fabales
- Family: Fabaceae
- Subfamily: Caesalpinioideae
- Genus: Senna
- Species: S. multijuga

Binomial name
- Senna multijuga (Rich.) H.S.Irwin & Barneby

Synonyms
- List: Cassia ampliflora Steud.; Cassia calliantha G.Mey.; Cassia centijuga Wawra; Cassia doylei (Britton & Rose) Lundell; Cassia lindleyana Gardner; Cassia magnifica Mart.; Cassia multiflora Scheele; Cassia multijuga Rich.; Cassia multijuga var. lindleyana (Gardner) Benth.; Cassia richardiana Kunth; Cassia scabrella Hoffmanns.; Cassia selloi G.Don; Cassia semifalcata Vell.; Cassia verrucosa Vogel; Chamaesenna multijuga (Rich.) Pittier; Peiranisia aristulata Britton & Killip; Peiranisia doylei Britton & Rose; Peiranisia multijuga (Rich.) Britton & Rose

= Senna multijuga =

Species of plant

Senna multijuga, known as November shower or false sicklepod, is a species of flowering plant in the family Fabaceae. It is native to wet tropical areas of Latin America, and widely introduced to other tropical locales such as Africa, India, Indonesia, China, Australia, and Hawaii. A fast-growing tree typically 10 m (33 ft) tall, it is planted in restoration projects, as an ornamental, and as a street tree, being especially useful under power lines.

== Description ==
Senna multijuga is a tree that typically grows to a height of up to 10 m (33 ft), sometimes to 40 m (130 ft) and sometimes flowering precociously as a shrub only 2 m (6 ft 7 in) high. The leaves are pinnate with 10 to 37 pairs of linear to elliptic leaflets 15–45 mm (0.59–1.77 in) long and 8–10 mm (0.31–0.39 in) wide. There are linear or bristle-like stipules 4–12 mm (0.16–0.47 in) long at the base. There is a pair of glands between the lowest pairs of leaflets, but that fall off as the leaves open. The flowers are yellow and arranged on the ends of branchlets in racemes of three to sixteen panicles, the lowest panicles with at least five flowers. Each panicle is on a peduncle 10–45 mm (0.39–1.77 in) long, each flower on a pedicel 13–32 mm (0.51–1.26 in) long. The five petals are 7–21 mm (0.28–0.83 in) long but differ from each other. The seven fertile stamens vary in length from 4.5 to 9 mm (0.18 to 0.35 in) long and there are three tiny staminodes. Flowering occurs from late summer to early autumn, and the fruit is a broadly linear pod 65–200 mm (2.6–7.9 in) long and 13–25 mm (0.51–0.98 in) wide containing thirty to sixty flattened seeds about 6 mm (0.24 in) long.

== Taxonomy ==
This species was first formally described in 1792 by Louis Claude Richard who gave it the name Cassia multijuga in his Actes de la Societe D' Histoire Naturelle de Paris. In 1982, Howard Samuel Irwin and Rupert Charles Barneby transferred the species to the genus Senna as S. multijuga in Memoirs of the New York Botanical Garden.

=== Subtaxa ===
The following subtaxa are accepted:

- Senna multijuga subsp. doylei (Britton & Rose) H.S.Irwin & Barneby – southwestern Mexico
- Senna multijuga subsp. lindleyana (Gardner) H.S.Irwin & Barneby – Colombia, Venezuela, Brazil
- Senna multijuga subsp. multijuga – entire range, introduced to Old World Tropics
- Senna multijuga var. peregrinatrix H.S.Irwin & Barneby – Colombia, Venezuela, Brazil
- Senna multijuga var. verrucosa (Vogel) H.S.Irwin & Barneby – eastern Brazil

== Distribution and habitat ==
Senna multijuga grows in disturbed forest, along watercourse and in gallery forest within savannah. It is native to northern parts of South America, and possibly Mexico, but is naturalised in many other countries, including India, parts of Southeast Asia and Africa, New Guinea and Australia. In Australia, it is restricted to Bellingen and Thora.
