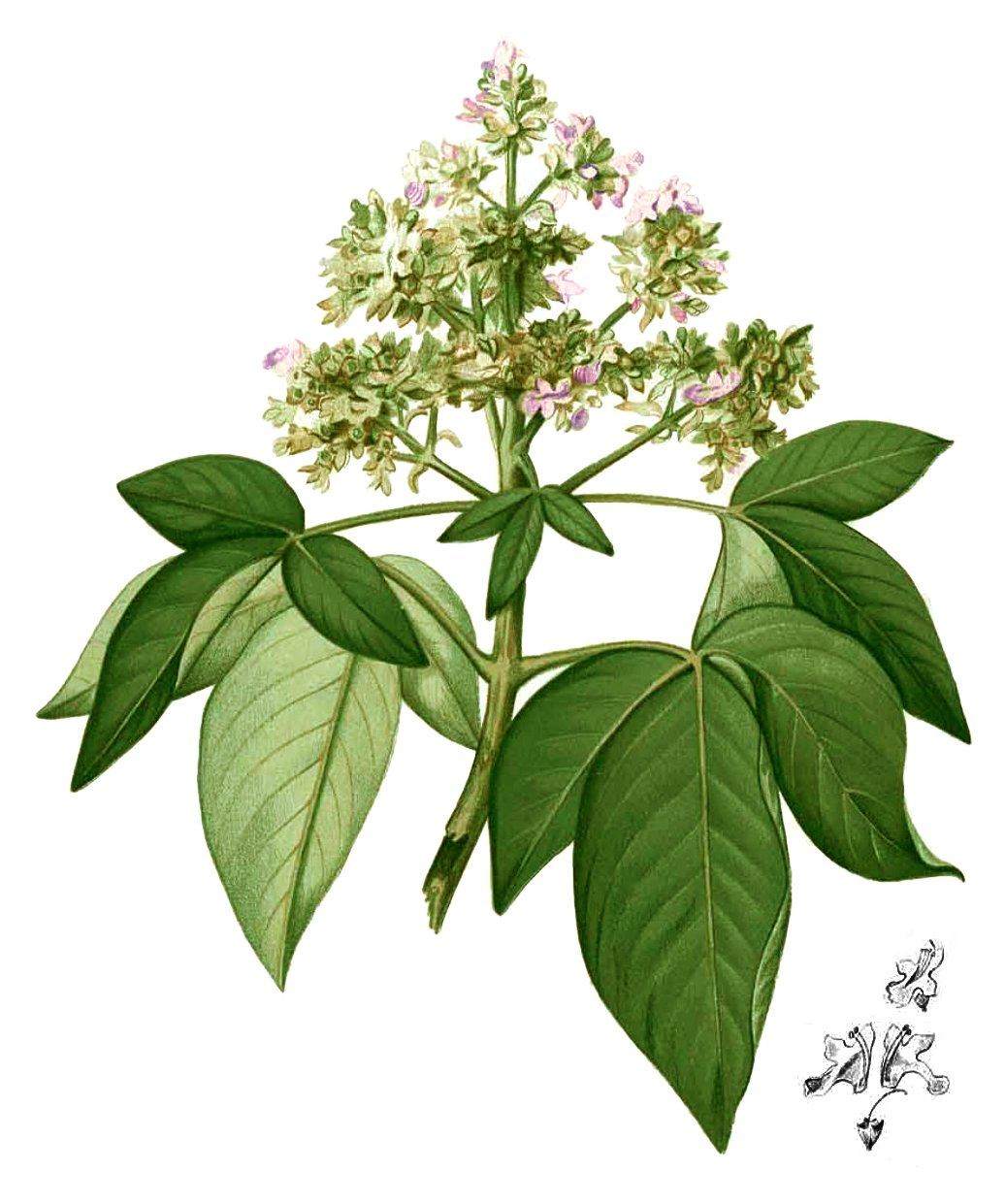

Conservation status
- Least Concern (IUCN 2.3)

Scientific classification
- Kingdom: Plantae
- Clade: Tracheophytes
- Clade: Angiosperms
- Clade: Eudicots
- Clade: Asterids
- Order: Lamiales
- Family: Lamiaceae
- Genus: Vitex
- Species: V. pinnata

Binomial name
- Vitex pinnata L.

Synonyms
- V. pubescens; V. arborea

= Vitex pinnata =

Species of tree

Vitex pinnata is a species of Vitex from the family of Lamiaceae. It is native to south and south east Asia. It grows slowly, ultimately reaching 20 metres in height with 1–3 m. circumference trunk. It features a grey-brown-yellow bark. Its leaves are scented.

== Description ==
Its bark is fissured, flaky, and pale yellowish grey to brown. The inner bark is pale yellow becoming green on exposure. The sapwood is soft yellow to brown. Its leaves are 3- or 5-foliolate. Leaflets are almost sessile. The outer two are usually much smaller than the others, ovate or elliptic. They are 3–25 cm long, 1.5–10 cm wide; their base is rounded to slightly wedge-shaped. The apex is acuminate; margin entire; secondary veins come in 10—20 pairs. Its inflorescences are terminal panicles. The flowers are whitish blue. The fruits are 5–8 mm in diameter; ripening black.

== Distribution ==
In the Indo-Malaysia region, it is found in Borneo including Sabah, Sarawak and across Kalimantan. It can be found in India, Sri Lanka and Cambodia. In the Philippines this species is known only on the islands of Palawan, Culion and Tawi-Tawi.

== Common names ==
Some of its common names are leban, laban, amola, gagil, humulawan, kalapapa (Kalimantan), hiketaroe (Sumba), pampa (Komodo Island), kopiher, stone aloban, kardoek aloban, flower aloban (Sumatra), many laban (Malaysia).

== Ecology ==
It grows well usually in secondary forests, on riverbanks and along roads including on marginal land such as Imperata cylindrica area. The species seemingly tolerates regular fires. In tropical conditions such as in East Kalimantan, flowering and fruiting are near-continuous from January to December. The fruits are eaten and dispersed by birds and its seeds need light to germinate.

== Uses ==
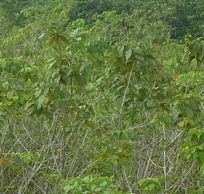
Vitex pinnata trees in young secondary forest

V. pinnata has a strong and durable wood, it is durable even in contact with water or soil. It is grayish brown in color. Density is about 930 kg per cubic metre (58 lbs per cubic foot). Wood is used for posts, door and window frames, beds and furniture.

The wood is used for knife handles, it is also building material for the gambus, a traditional Malay musical instrument. The leaves and bark are used to treat abdominal pain, fever and malaria.

== Propagation ==
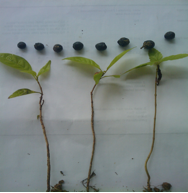
Wildlings and seeds of Vitex pinnata

V. pinnata can be propagated by seeds, cuttings and wildlings. One kilogram of Vitex pinnata seeds number around 1100-1200 seeds.
