= Oak wilt =

Plant disease

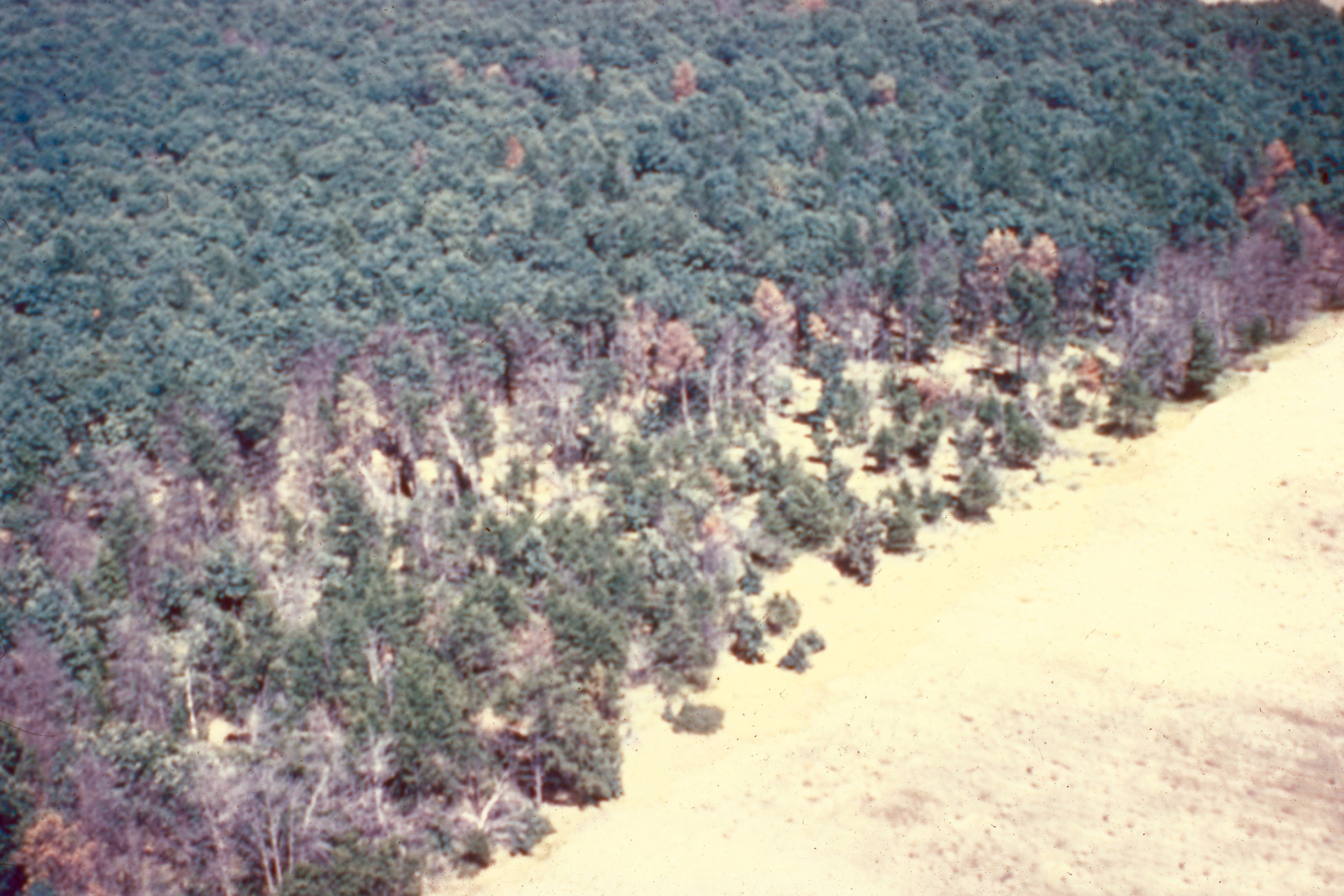
- Aerial photograph of an oak wilt center (St. Paul, MN)
- Causal agents: Bretziella fagacearum
- Hosts: Quercus spp.
- Vectors: Nitidulidae
- EPPO code: CERAFA
- Distribution: US
- Symptoms: leaf discoloration, wilt, defoliation and death

Bretziella fagacearum
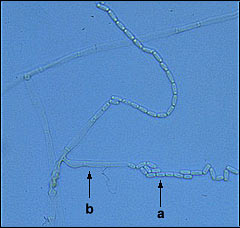
- Spores produced by the oak wilt fungus (a) Endoconidia (b) Conidiophore

Scientific classification
- Kingdom: Fungi
- Division: Ascomycota
- Class: Sordariomycetes
- Order: Microascales
- Family: Ceratocystidaceae
- Genus: Bretziella
- Species: B. fagacearum

Binomial name
- Bretziella fagacearum (Bretz) Z.W. de Beer, Marincowitz, T.A. Duong & M.J. Wingfield
- USA counties with oak wilt (2017)

Synonyms
- Chalara quercina; Endoconidiophora fagacearum; Thielaviopsis quercina; Ceratocystis fagacearum

Oak wilt is a fungal disease caused by the organism Bretziella fagacearum that threatens Quercus spp. The disease is limited to the eastern half of the United States, Central Texas, and Southern Ontario. First described in the 1940s in the Upper Mississippi River Valley, the pathogen penetrates xylem tissue, preventing water transport and causing disease symptoms. Symptoms generally consist of leaf discoloration, wilt, defoliation, and death. The disease is dispersed by insect vectors and to adjacent trees through underground root networks. However, human spread is the most consequential dispersal method. Moving firewood long distances can potentially transport diseases and invasive species.

== Disease ==
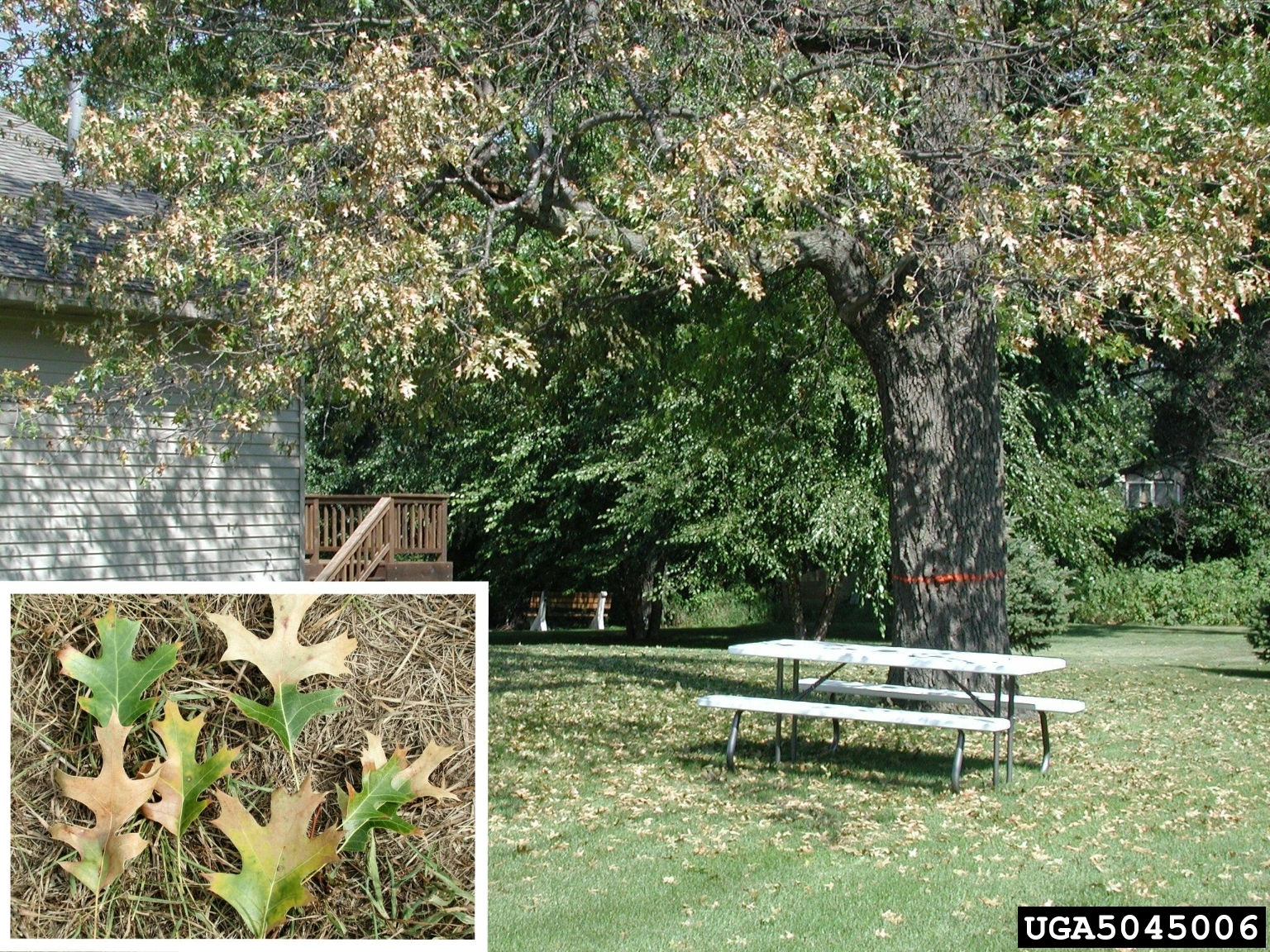
Oak wilt symptoms

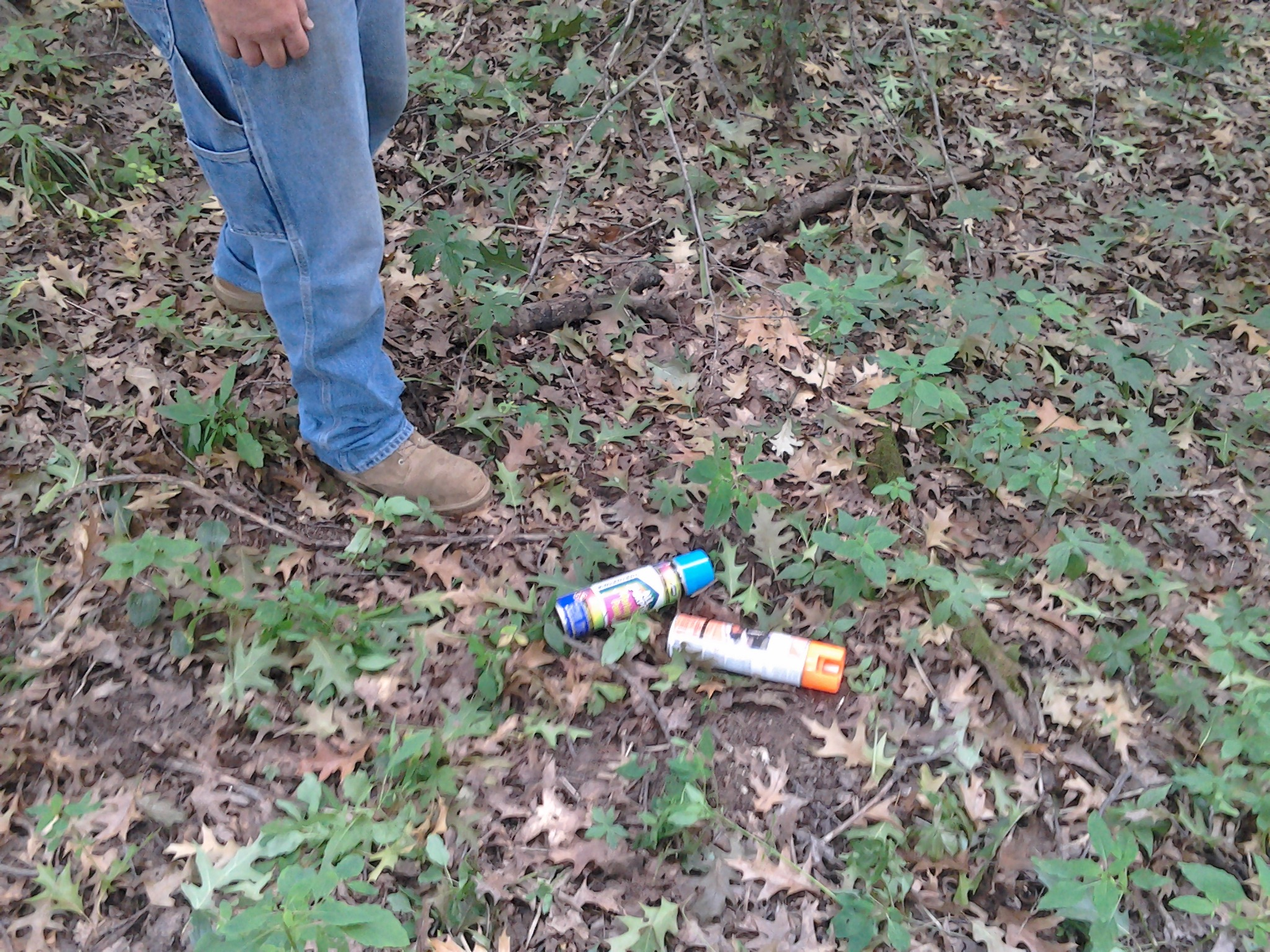
Sudden leaf drop

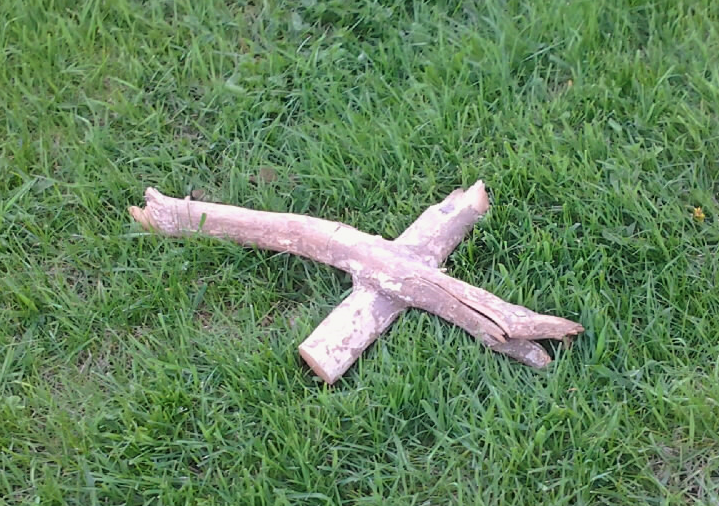
Excavated root graft

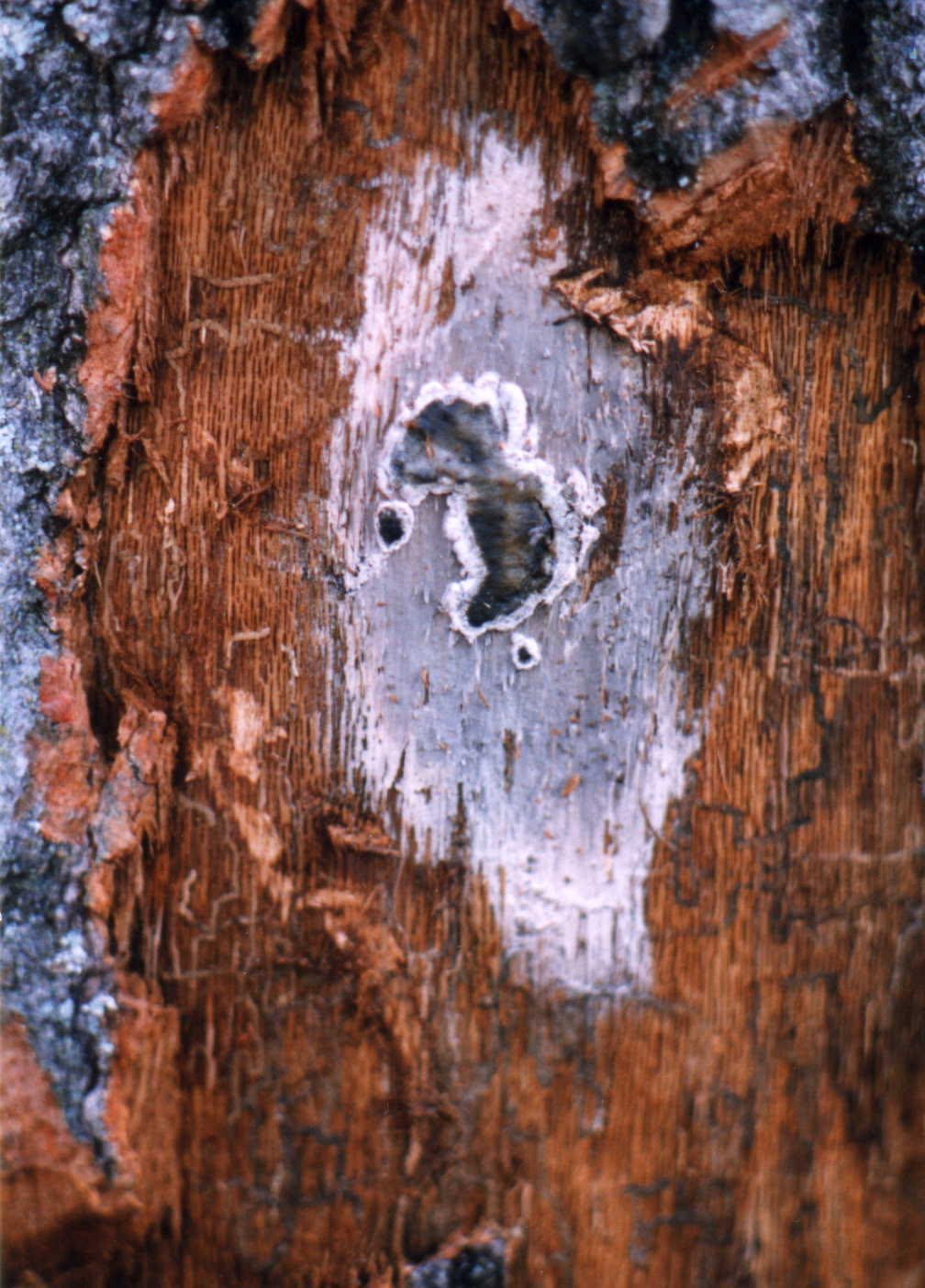
Spore mat

Oak wilt is a devastating exotic disease, killing some trees rapidly in a single season. Oak wilt is an important disease in urban areas where trees are highly valued. The disease reduces property values because of the loss of trees and is economically costly to the property owner since they or the local government must pay for tree removal. Additionally, preventing the spread of the disease to healthy trees is costly and requires vigilance. Oak wilt is also an important disease in a forest setting, as entire forest stands can die within a few years. There is a narrow window to salvage diseased trees for hardwood lumber and often the disease is not discovered within that logging window. The ecological impacts to forests is also a concern. The disease is currently restricted to North America, but is potentially a serious threat to oaks worldwide.

All Quercus spp. appear susceptible to the disease, with 33 oak species confirmed to be susceptible; including three species of Castanea, one species of Castanopsis, one species of Lithocarpus, and some oaks native to Europe (Q. petraea, Q. pubescens, and Q. robur). Generally, red oaks (subsection Lobatae) display more severe symptoms with rapid and frequent mortality (particularly Q. velutina, Q. rubra, Q. ellipsoidalis and Q. coccinea). White oaks (subsection Quercus) develop symptoms more slowly, rarely die, and can recover from the pathogen with damage limited to a few branches (particularly Q. alba and Q. macrocarpa). Live oaks (Q. fusiformis and Q. virginiana) display intermediate symptoms compared to red or white oaks. However, live oaks are semi-evergreen, can propagate vegetatively by root suckering, and cohabitate with other live oaks in dense stands enabling interconnected root systems. These traits are favorable for local spread of the disease in an oak-grassland savanna.

=== History ===
Oak wilt is one of three devastating North American vascular wilt diseases that appeared in the early 20th century. The other two vascular wilts are chestnut blight (1900–1950) and Dutch elm disease (1928–1980). Each of these diseases have depopulated their respective host tree populations. Chestnut trees were the dominant overstory tree species before chestnut blight and elms were an iconic landscape tree that bordered streets before Dutch elm disease. Oak wilt and the newly emerging emerald ash borer have the potential to devastate other important North American tree species with large geographical and cultural significance. Range expansion of oak wilt to the Western United States (or to other continents) is a major concern.

The asexual stage of oak wilt was first described in 1942 in Wisconsin. Soon thereafter the disease was reported throughout the Upper Midwest and Central forests. The early 20th century coincided with oak regeneration after significant logging in the Mid-Atlantic and Great Lakes region. Deforestation and fire suppression in this region altered the ecology to favor oak–hickory forests, instead of coniferous forests and grasslands. Subsequently, the host for the disease became more prevalent and promoted oak wilt infections. Moving timber during the late 19th century and early 20th century, in the period of railroad expansion, coincides with the discovery of the oak wilt disease in the United States.

The origin of the disease is unknown, but probably emerged from Mexico, Central America, or South America. Mexico is the global center of oak diversity, supporting it as the endemic range of oak wilt. Any biocontrol or disease resistance for this pathogen will likely come from Mexico. The disease currently affects much of the eastern and central US, from northern New York to Central Texas. It is particularly common in the Midwest where conditions are usually favorable for spore production and beetle activity during spring and early summer. Oak wilt is a major problem in Illinois, Iowa, Michigan, Minnesota, Texas, and Wisconsin.

=== Disease cycle ===
Oak wilt disease cycle

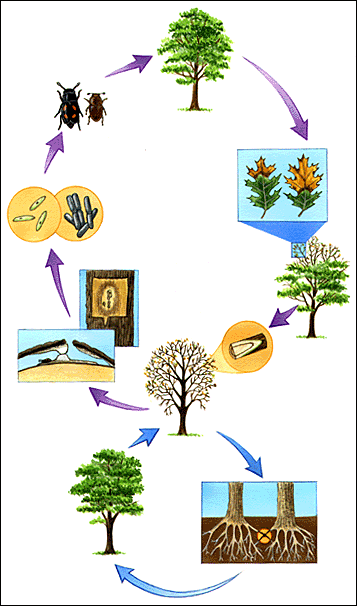
Top cycle. Overland Spread (Initiation of new infection center).
- Spores germinate and infect oak tree.
- Infection spreads throughout the tree and leaf symptoms develop. Discoloration develops in the vacular tissue.
- Tree dies.
- Fungal pressure pads and spore-bearing mats form under bark.
- Nitidulids feed in pads and emerge with spores in and on their bodies.
- Nitidulids visit fresh wounds on healthy oak and deposit spores.

Bottom cycle. Root graft Spread (Expansion of infection center).

- Fungal spore move through grafted roots into adjacent uninfected trees.
- Healthy tree becomes infected.

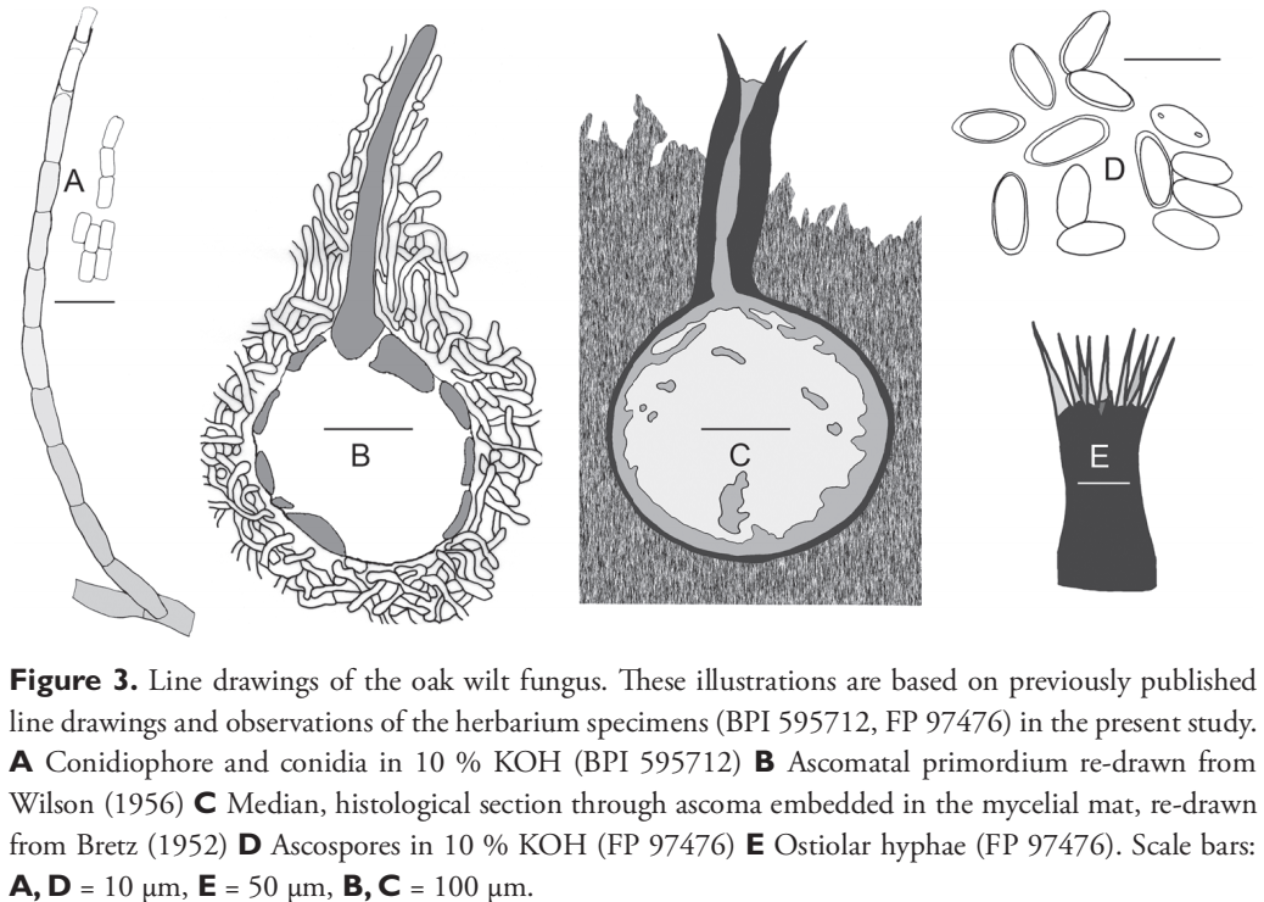
Illustration of Bretziella fagacearum

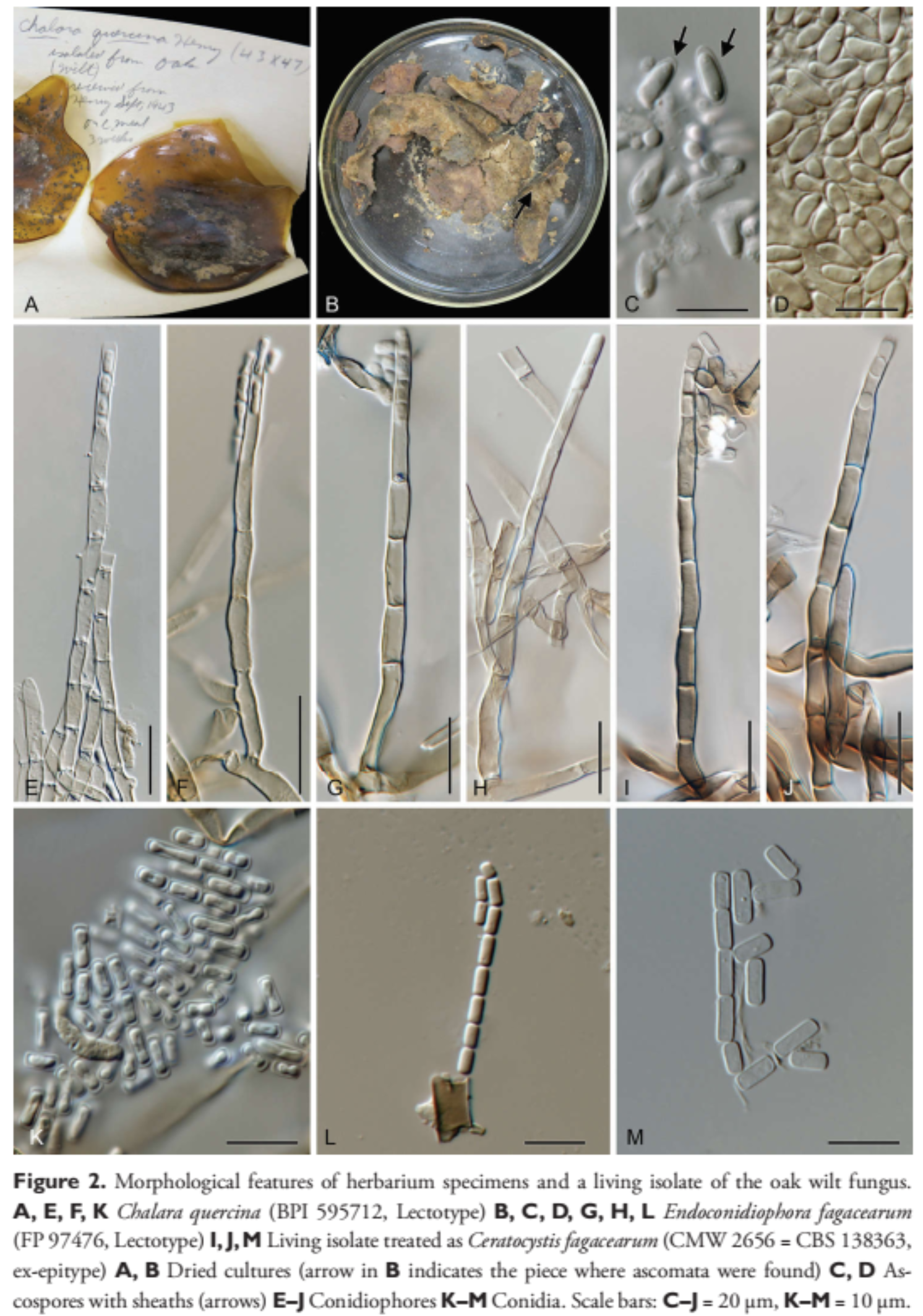
Photograph of Bretziella fagacearum

The fungus overwinters on dead tissue from diseased trees. Symptoms first appear in spring and summer. Highly susceptible species typically die within one year (often within six weeks) after symptoms appear. Symptoms begin in the tops of trees and can be difficult to notice. The disease progresses inward and downward from the tree top. Leaves become chlorotic beginning at the leaf tip and leaf edges. An abrupt demarcation of chlorotic veins and green tissue is often a distinguishing characteristic in live oak infections. The foliage may droop, curl lengthwise, wilt, and begin to fall. Leaves drop from the tree in the middle of summer, however less susceptible trees may retain leaves longer and resemble seasonal autumn foliage. Highly susceptible species will exhibit rapid crown dieback, while less susceptible species may only lose a few scattered branches. Live oaks may survive several years with progressive dieback, but often die within six months. Following defoliation, fungal fruiting bodies develop from mycelium under the bark of the tree. The mats grow to 10–20 cm in size, elliptical in shape, and grey in color with white margins that darken with age. These mats are not found on live oaks and rarely on white oaks. Trees capable of producing mats are called potential spore-producing trees (PSPT). Brown streaks in the sapwood is also observed in the oak wilt disease. However, this symptom is not always associated with the disease.

The oak wilt fungus can spread from diseased trees to healthy trees in several ways. The disease can spread long distances (overland) by airborne spores in open wounds caused by wind damage, pruning, or other mechanical damage. Alternatively, under ideal conditions (temperature, moisture content, wood pH) spore mats form under the bark of the dead tree. Spore mats develop in the spring or fall for 2–3 weeks. The center of spore mats produce chains of barrel shaped spores, called endoconidia. Conidia are asexual spores dispersed by air, rain, and insects. If compatible mating types are present, these mats will also produce sexual spores called ascospores in fruiting structures called perithecia. Ascospores are spread by water and insects. These spore mats (or pressure pads) increase in size, eventually breaking through the bark and releasing a fruity odor that attracts wildlife, including sap beetles, bark beetles, other insects, birds and animals, such as squirrels. Insect vectors transmit the disease in spring to early summer in the Midwest and late winter in Texas. Insect transmission is the primary way new infection foci originate.

The fungus can spread short distances through naturally occurring root grafts. Root grafts form when two or more underground roots merge from adjacent trees. Typically, roots from the same, or similar species, can form root grafts as their cambia are pressed together and combine. Fungal spores in the xylem travel to nearby trees through these root grafts and can rapidly kill many trees simultaneously. This transmission method accounts for the vast majority of infections and is particularly devastating as groups of trees are killed. The disease can extend 10–20 m per year (40 m per year in Texas) from the infection foci to surrounding trees. Diseased trees can continue to harbor and transmit the disease for several years through the root network.

The disease results from fungal spores clogging xylem vessels and preventing water and nutrient flow. Mycelia growth between and through vessels end up blocking xylem pits in the vessel endwalls. Tylose protrusion and the accumulation of 'gums' will further obstruct vessels. Tylose is an outgrowth of parenchyma cells created as a plant defense against pathogens, water deficiency, wounding, and heartwood formation. Tylose formation signals senescence of adjacent parenchyma cells and secretion of secondary metabolites (called gums), which may include phenolics. The interruption of the xylem vessels precedes tylose formation. Tylose and secreted gums act as a barrier to slow the colonization of the pathogen and play an important part in plant defenses. However, the action to compartmentalize the oak wilt fungus ultimately obstructs all water conductance, leading to death. The fungus can survive in the xylem for multiple years, if the tree is not killed.

Oak Wilt Management Quick Guide

Early detection and prompt action are essential for successful management of oak wilt. The specific measures taken depend on several circumstances but should include appropriate combinations of the following:

- Prevent New Infections
  - Remove and dispose of oak wilt-infected red oaks immediately.
  - Avoid wounding oak trees, including pruning from,
    - February through June in Texas.
    - April through October in the Mid-West.
  - Sterilize/sanitize all pruning equipment between trees.
  - Paint all wounds and fresh stumps immediately regardless of season.
  - Handle oak firewood cautiously, burn all firewood before spring, and never store unseasoned oak wood from infected trees near healthy oaks.
  - Cover unseasoned firewood (from infection centers and unknown origins) with clear plastic and bury the edges of the plastic.
- Diversify Your Landscape
  - Plant trees that are native and/or adapted to your area.
  - Favor a diversity of tree species.
  - Avoid wounding oaks during planting.
- Stop Spread through Root Connections
  - Install a trench at least 4 ft deep and 100 ft beyond the perimeter of infection centers (last symptomatic tree) to break up root connections.
  - Cut or uproot all trees within the 100-ft barrier (except those injected with fungicide).
- Inject High-Value Oaks with Fungicide
  - Identify susceptible, high-value oak trees in proximity to expanding oak wilt infection centers.
  - Consult a trained and licensed arborist (with certified applicator's license) for treatment of susceptible trees with injections of propiconazole.

— Texas Oak Wilt

== Management ==
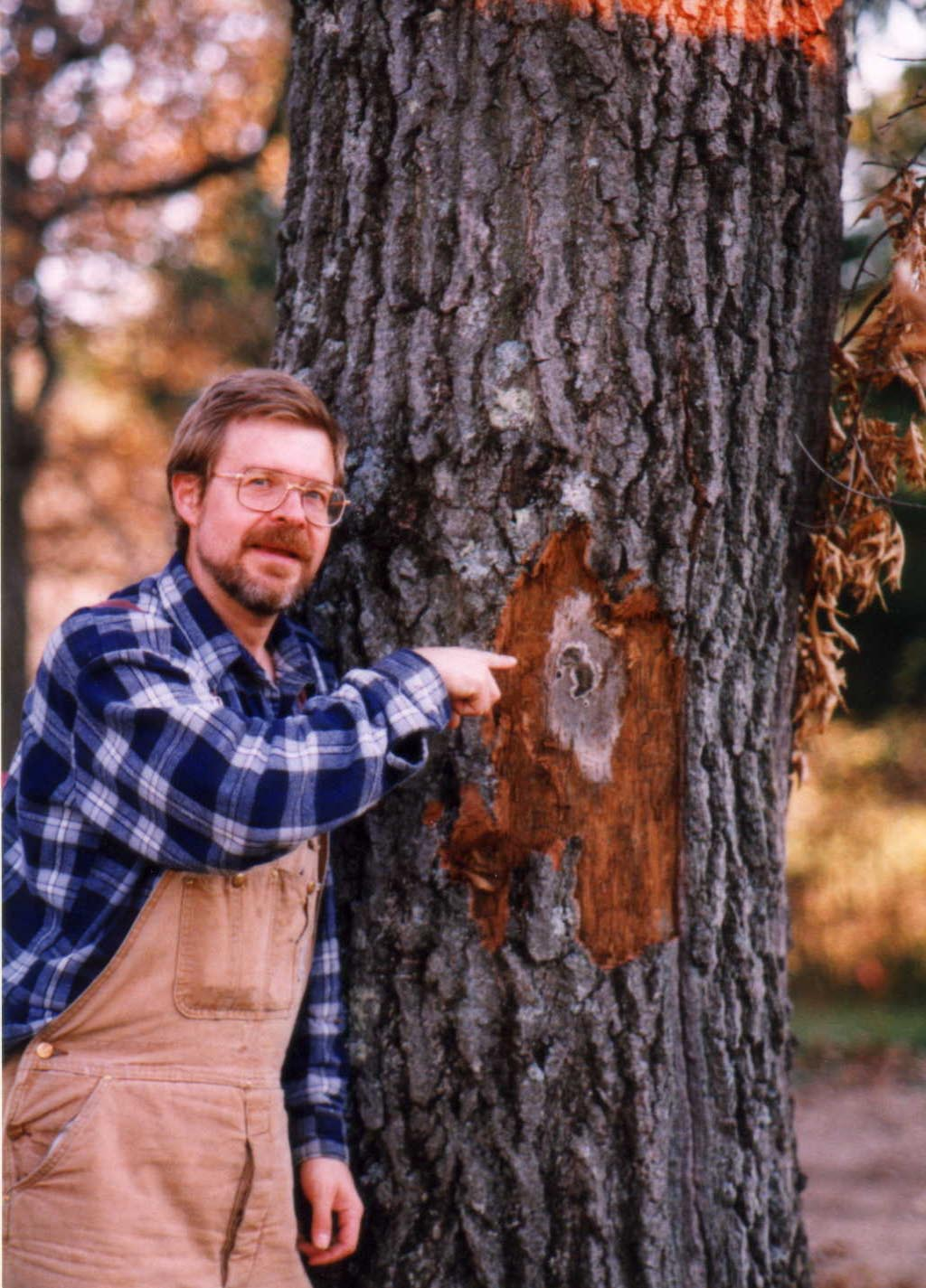
Wood caramel colored, spore mats stage III is infectious

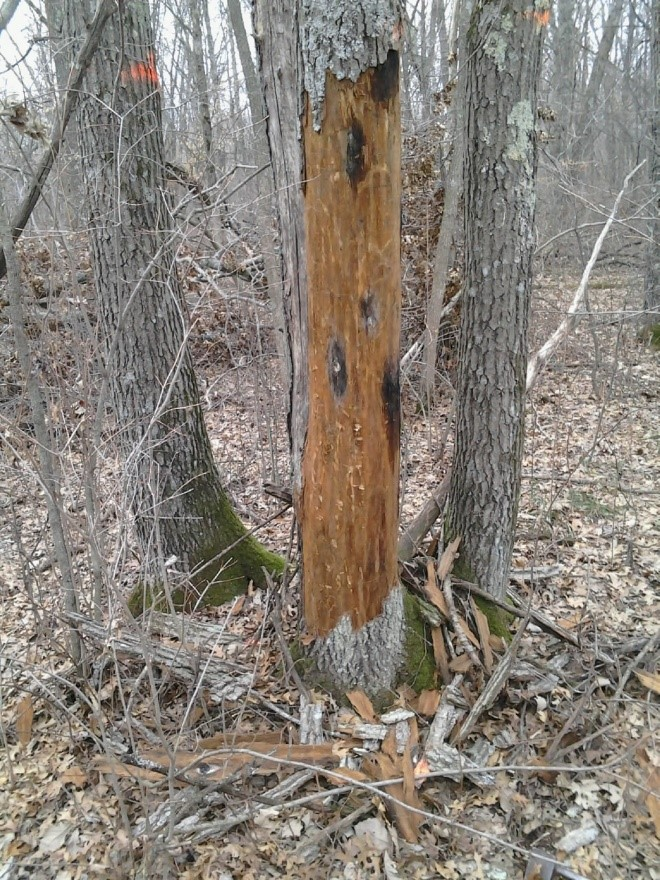
Spore mats (dark patches) stage IV – V are no longer infectious

Elimination of the disease is not possible; therefore, managing the disease is essential to prevent economic and ecological losses. Management of the oak wilt disease includes forest integrated pest management; such as sanitation, chemical application, and cultural control. Ideally, several methods are used in conjunction to enhance disease control. Any chosen method relies on specific landowner objectives; such as protecting high value trees, treating individual trees, halting or slowing the spread of an infection center, and reducing the number of new infection foci. All methods depend on timely detection and accurate diagnosis of the disease to be beneficial. Aerial observation (or remote sensing) is able to identify infected forest stands by observing the dead crowns of trees in summer. The use of spectroscopy is being developed for large scale detection and monitoring of oak wilt.

=== Chemical control ===
Chemical control can be preventative or therapeutic, depending on risk and resources available. Propiconazole is the principle fungicide for treatment against oak wilt. Propiconazole is a broad-spectrum systemic fungicide that interferes with the biosynthesis of ergosterol in cell membranes by binding to 14 alpha-demethylase. Tree injection is the preferred application method to deliver targeted control. Tree injections involve intravascular injections with positive pressure to force the chemical throughout the vascular system of the tree. This method is relatively expensive and requires a trained arborist to perform . Propiconazole injection does not offer protection to neighboring trees and must be applied to all target trees.

Preventative propiconazole application does not prevent infection, rather it delays symptoms and reduces mortality. All oak species studied have benefited from preventative propiconazole treatment. This method is often applied to high value trees in an urban area, specifically Northern red oaks and live oaks. White oaks are more disease resistant, thus preventative treatment is unnecessary. Likewise, therapeutic propiconazole application does not eradicate the fungal infection, rather it delays symptoms and reduces mortality. Highly susceptible red oaks rarely benefit from therapeutic treatment, but symptomatic white oaks improve with treatment. Asymptomatic live oaks will respond better to propiconazole treatment than symptomatic trees.

Spring application is the most effective time for chemical treatment. Multiple applications, every two years, may be necessary for long-term disease control.

=== Cultural control ===
==== Mechanical ====
Mechanical separation of the underground root connections will not allow the disease to transfer to adjacent trees. However, ensuring all root connections are severed is difficult and impractical to verify. Notwithstanding, digging a trench (or plowline) four feet deep around infected trees is an effective cultural control strategy. The plowline should encompass any infected tree. In practice this consists of all trees expected to be connected by a root graft with an infected tree, in addition to all symptomatic trees. In the Mid-West, a plowline 50 feet away from infected trees is recommended. In Central Texas, live oak lateral roots grow at a shallow depth in rocky soil, allowing an extensive root network with neighboring trees. For this reason, a plowline 100 feet away from infected trees is recommended. A second plowline between all symptomatic trees and visibly healthy trees will reinforce this control strategy.

The plowline can be created with agricultural machinery, such as an excavator, rock saw, vibratory plow, and bulldozer with ripper or subsoiler. Equipment costs and availability will vary.

The placement of a root barrier can offer additional protection to trenching, but increases total costs. A geomembrane is a semipermeable textile (similar to landscape fabric) that physically blocks roots from coming into contact. It is essential that trenching and geomembrane installation occur before removing infected trees.

==== Sanitation ====
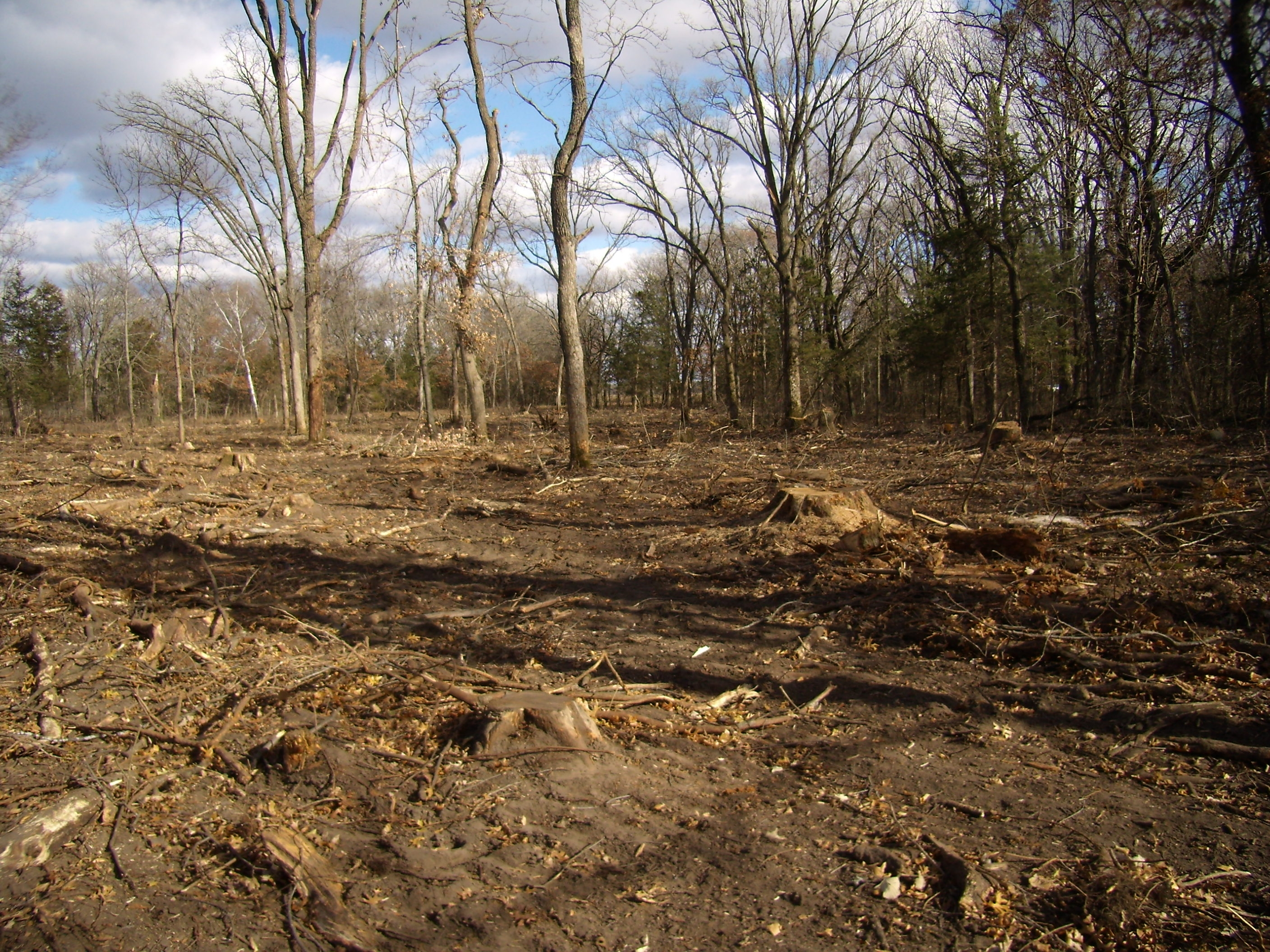
Cultural control (sanitation) of oak wilt infection area

Sanitation entails removing infectious material to reduce inoculum before new infections can develop. Red oaks are the only group capable of forming spore mats, designated as PSPTs. Therefore, removing any PSPTs that become infected is essential to minimize new infection foci. Furthermore, removing all PSPTs, regardless of symptoms, within an infected area reinforces the process. In practice this consists of removing all PSPTs within the plowline (see Mechanical). Trees will need to be removed annually to sustain control over the years. Tree removal involves felling and burying or burning the logs, ensuring all inoculum is discarded. Alternatively, logs and slash can be chipped or mulched on site. Tree stumps can also be removed to increase sanitation.

Girdling infected trees is another method to reduce the spread of oak wilt; although, not as effective as whole tree removal. Girdling requires the complete detachment of the cambium from the PSPTs. Moreover, debarking the trunk of the tree (up to 4 feet) is essential. Oak wilt does not produce fruiting bodies on dead or dry wood. Debarking speeds the drying process and assists Hypoxylon coccineum in colonizing the wood.

Sap beetles are opportunistic insects, incapable of penetrating a tree without an open wound. Therefore, avoid pruning or felling oak trees when fungal spores and beetles are active. In the Mid-West avoid injuring oaks from April to October and prune limbs after the first hard frost, or from November until April. In Texas avoid pruning oaks from February through June. Moreover, clean pruning equipment between each tree and apply tree paint to any injury or open wound. Injuries often occur during construction and severe weather.

==== Silviculture ====
Silviculture involves keeping a forest healthy. Typically, a healthy forest with healthy trees will be more resistant to pests and diseases. Thinning is the process of removing unwanted trees to promote the growth of the desired trees. Oaks are shade intolerant species. Releasing (or thinning) oaks from competition provides more light, moisture, and nutrients to the remaining oaks. Overall the oaks become stronger, more healthy, and more capable to resist pests and disease.

Increasing tree species diversity (i.e. species evenness) in a forest is another method to lessen the impact of the disease. Evidence shows increasing diversity in a landscape can increase forest resilience to pests and disease. Moreover, increasing diversity can increase soil microbial communities and ecosystem services.

=== Education ===
Education is the most valuable tool to combat the spread of pests and diseases. In this context, warning the public about the spread of oak wilt by humans. Specifically, people take fuelwood from one location to another location, often long distances. This action is responsible for moving pathogens in those logs to places they are not currently present. Spreading oak wilt to new locations through firewood is a major problem. Moreover, covering firewood with clear plastic can solarize the wood pile and eradicate any pathogens.

Prevent the spread of invasive species and diseases

- Don't take firewood with you on your camping trip, RV adventure, or to your hunting camp.
- Don't bring firewood back from your second home to your place in the suburbs.
- Buy firewood near where you will burn it, or gather firewood on site when permitted.
  - A good rule of thumb is only using wood that was cut within 50 miles of where you'll have your fire.
- Certified heat-treated firewood is safe to move long distances.
- Aged or seasoned wood is still not safe.
  - Just because it is dry doesn't mean that bugs can't crawl onto it – and some insects can take several years to mature inside the wood.
  - Wood that looks clean and healthy can still have tiny insect eggs, or microscopic fungi spores, that will start a new and deadly infestation.

— Don't Move Firewood
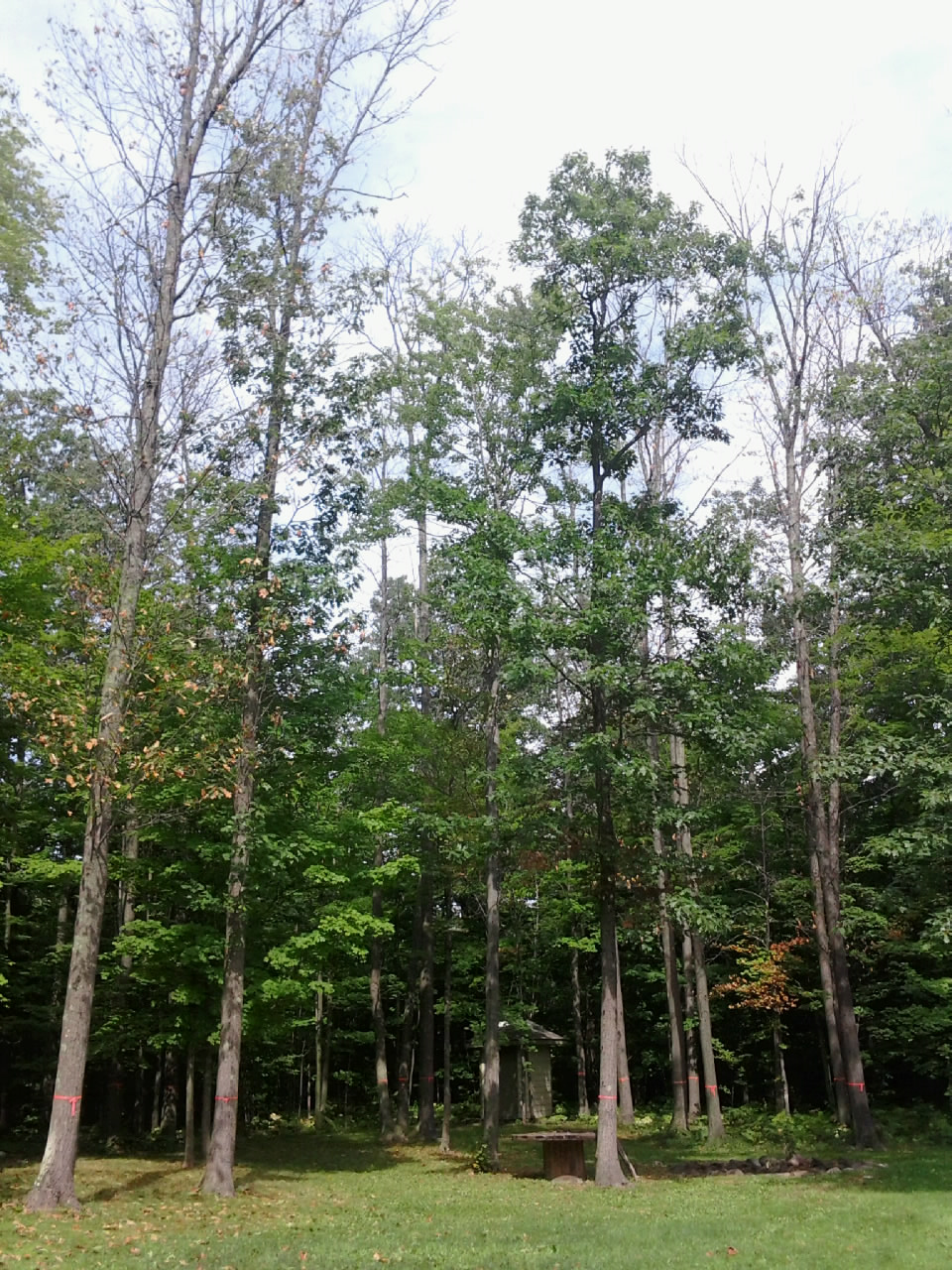
Infected trees

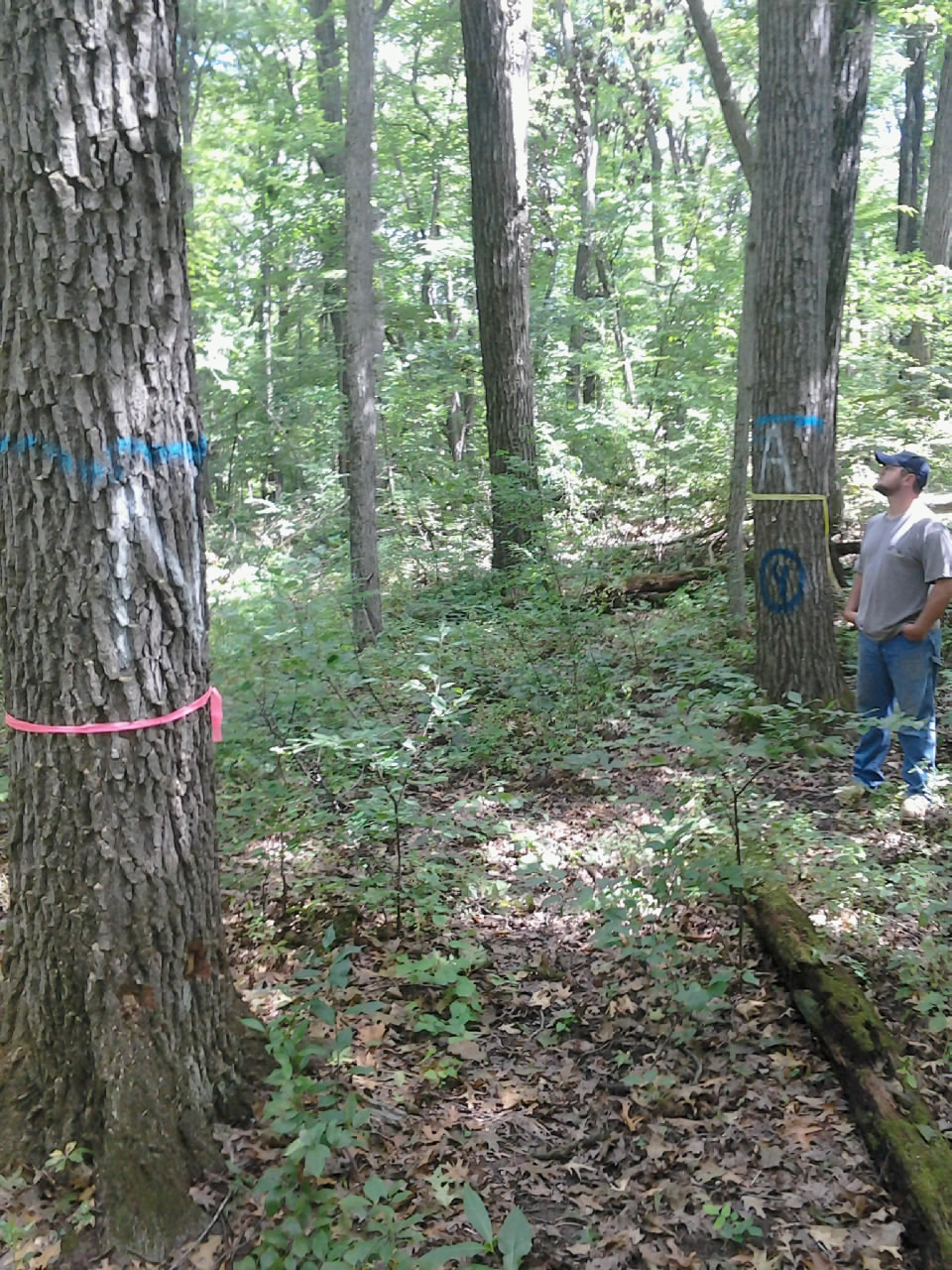
Infection foci on hilltop

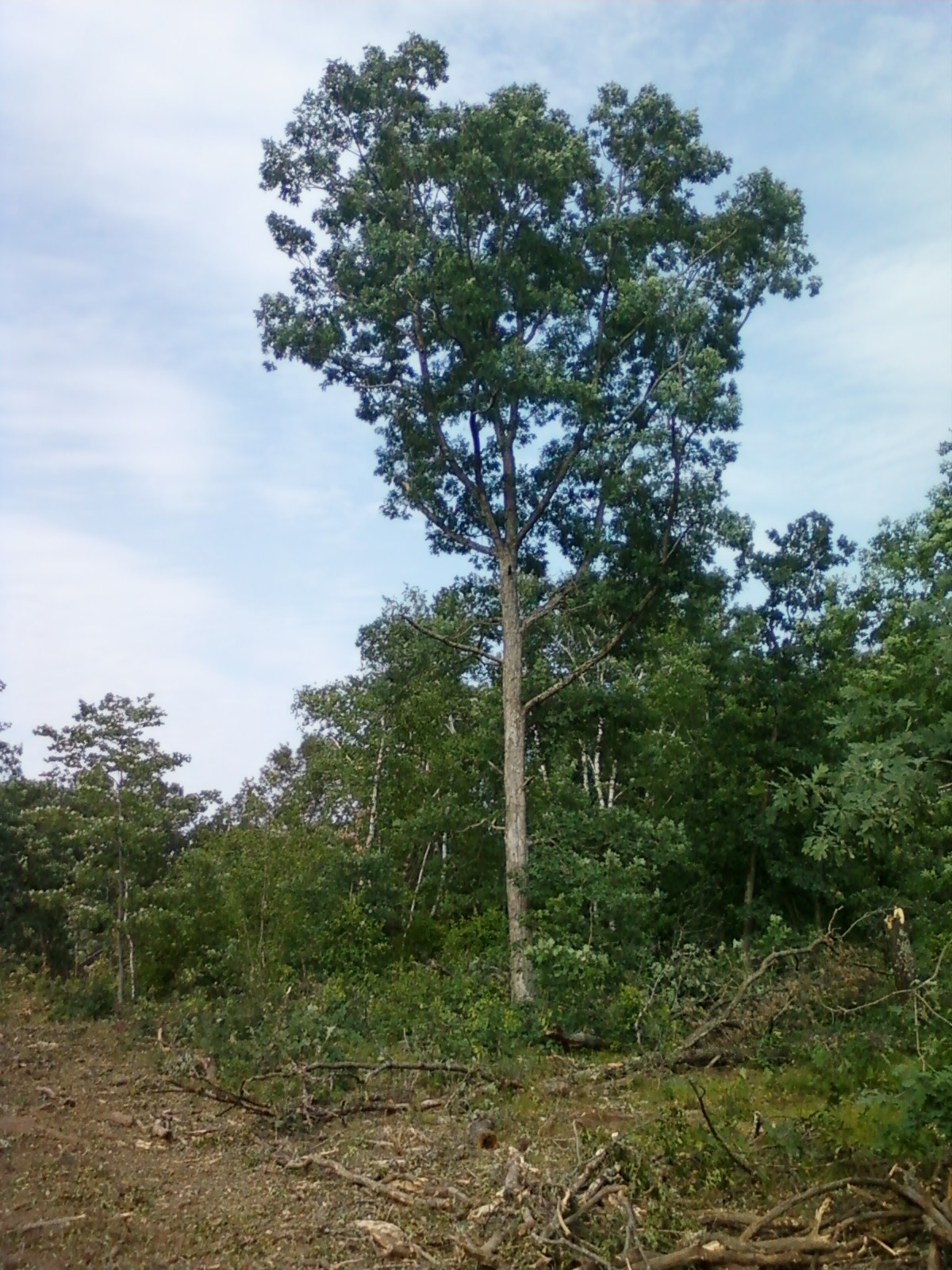
White oak after storm damage

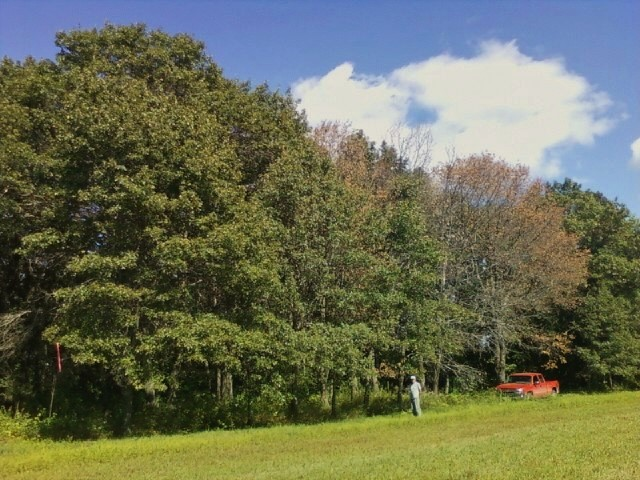
Northern pin oak overland infection
Photos from Far left – 24–25 May 2016 wind & hailstorms, next three 1 July 2011 windstorm

== See also ==
- Japanese oak wilt – caused by Raffaelea quercivora in Japan
- Sudden oak death – caused by Phytophthora ramorum
