= Platypus quercivorus =

Scientific classification
- Kingdom: Animalia
- Phylum: Arthropoda
- Clade: Pancrustacea
- Class: Insecta
- Order: Coleoptera
- Suborder: Polyphaga
- Infraorder: Cucujiformia
- Family: Curculionidae
- Genus: Platypus
- Species: P. quercivorus

Binomial name
- Platypus quercivorus Murayama, 1925

Species of beetle

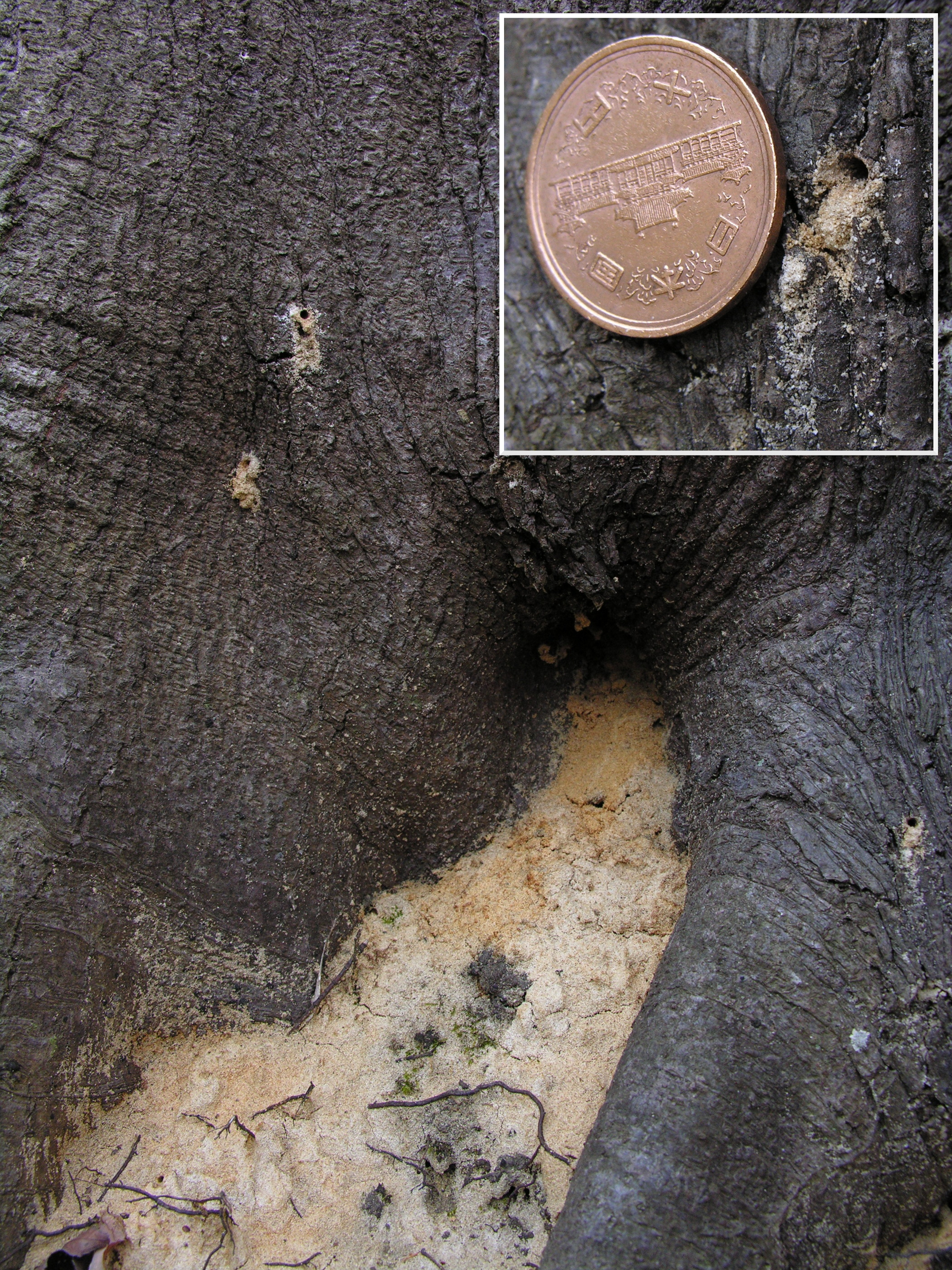
Holes drilled by Platypus quercivorus.

Platypus quercivorus, the oak ambrosia beetle, is a species of weevil and pest of broad-leaved trees. This species is most commonly known for vectoring the fungus responsible for excessive oak dieback in Japan since the 1980s. It is found in Japan, India, Indonesia, New Guinea, and Taiwan.

== Description ==
Since P. quercivorus belongs to the Platypodinae, it has distinct clubs on the end of its stout antennae with three solid segments. Usually, the beetle is between 4 and 5 mm long, reddish-brown in colour, and is elongate and roughly cylindrical. The prothorax is as wide as the head.

Males have a shallow, unarmed plate on the underside of the thorax and a convex and downward slope of their elytra. The elytra have a broad square end and spines at the top.

Females have a mycangium on the pronotum for carrying symbiotic fungi spores. Although this trait may be in both females and males, it is always in females and rarely in males.

== Habitat ==
Although well known in Japan, this species also lives in India, Indonesia, New Guinea and Taiwan.

Trees to inhabit are often selected for based on olfactory and visual cues. Infestation of these habitats occurs in stages beginning with males flying to and landing on a tree and then boring into the bark through the stems. Typically, this species aggregates in areas with clusters of similar, suitable trees to increase infestation efficiency. This may be due to coevolutionary factors with tree species Quercus crispula as it is most suitable for gallery formation and is distributed in a clumped pattern. This allows for an increased chance of more abundant, successful galleries. Trees are also selected for more often with increasing diameter at breast height (DBH). This allows for more room for gallery formation, which are often located in lower trunks of oak trees.

Males of this species are attracted to soaked logs over dry logs. The anaerobic conditions of the submerged logs increases the likelihood of a male choosing those logs to create a gallery. This may occur because those conditions favour the growth of the beetle's fungi symbionts.

There is a preference for edge habitats over deep forest interiors. Roadsides and other edges act as attractions for the beetle. This attraction may be due to an increased light presence as the species is positively phototactic. This beetle prefers habitats with the highest light intensity when offered varying intensities.

It has been suggested that the 0.4˚C increase in average temperature compared to the last 100 years in Japan is responsible for the increased range of the beetle and oak dieback. The warmer climate has allowed the beetle to move north, encountering its best suited host, Q. crispula. It is proposed that as the climate increases, more overlap between the beetle and the best suited host will occur, resulting in an even stronger oak dieback epidemic.

== Reproduction ==
=== Mate choice ===
Due to the monogamous nature of the oak ambrosia beetle, mate selection is vital for both females and males. It is in the male's best interest to select a mate capable of excavating the gallery, planting nourishing fungi for larvae, oviposition, and bringing frass to the male for removal. For females, selecting a male that has bored into a tree with sufficient resources is important to increase fecundity.

Mating is male-initiated. Males will bore a cylindrical entrance tunnel during late spring to early summer, meet the female there, and mate at the entrance hole. The male will enter the gallery first, followed by the female. Then, both back out of the gallery, changing positions so that the female will enter first for the second entrance, and enter again. They will then both back out until the female's abdomen is exposed and copulation will begin. It is suggested that female mate choice occurs between the first and second entrance because she is then able to view the gallery whereas male mate choice occurs at the beginning of the process when he decides whether or not to let the female enter the tunnel he bored. Once both the male and female have chosen to proceed with reproduction, males make signals to prevent other females from entering the gallery.

=== Parental care ===
Each pairing will create one gallery with vertical and lateral branches and die in it together. The female will deposit eggs at the tunnel's ends two to three weeks following gallery completion. This must be done in trees that have not been previously infested by other P. quercivorus. The male will then create a barricade at the gallery's entrance with his body. Here, he waits for the female to bring frass and bored dust which the male will then discard outside. This species has a high reproduction rate, which in addition to low brood mortality resulting from cooperative parental care, may contribute to the high reproductive success of this species.

Reproductive success is shown to be higher in logs than in living trees. Galleries in living trees lowers reproductive success of the oak ambrosia beetle because the tree's defensive mechanism of sap secretion enters galleries and kills individuals. Tree species Q. crispula is the most suitable host species for reproducing and rearing offspring.

=== Growth and development ===
Eggs hatch in about a week. The larvae then graze on the symbiotic fungi covering the gallery walls and pass through five instars. Adults emerge from their mother galleries 2–4 hours following dawn due to their diurnal tendencies. Approximately 40% of broods reach adulthood by late summer to early fall. After reaching adulthood, individuals usually leave their galleries but some remain in their maternal galleries. The remaining 60% of broods will reach the fifth larval stage by mid fall and overwinter in pupal chambers. These individuals emerge as adults in late spring to early summer. This brooding technique is partially bivoltine because approximately 40% of each population takes one year to complete a life cycles whereas the other 60% may have two generations in a year. Individuals that remain in maternal galleries are often shown to not reproduce but rather, clean the galleries, which presents the possibility that this species may have eusocial tendencies. It is assumed that parents die either before or during winter.

== Interspecific relationships ==
P. quercivorus has symbiotic relationships with fungi and oak trees.

=== Symbiotic relationship with fungi ===
P. quercivorus acts as the primary vector for the parthenogenic fungus Raffaelea quercivora, which causes Japanese Oak Wilt disease. The oak ambrosia beetle bores into sapwood and heartwood of host oaks commonly including Q. crispula and Quercus serrata. Once infected, these trees wilt and die, paralleling the effects of Dutch elm disease.

The oak ambrosia beetle carries not only the pathogen itself, but also dietary fungus symbionts in mycangia. Once galleries are constructed by the beetle in the sapwood of a host tree, the released fungi disseminate in yeast-like microbes and grow on the gallery walls. P. quercivorus larvae then hatch and feed on the growing fungi.

In addition to R. quercivora, P. quercivorus has at least one other main symbiont, Candida kashinagacola, as these two fungi species are found in all tree host types selected for by the beetle. The latter fungus species, however, has not been linked to any parasitic tree diseases. In both relationships, the beetle receives a food source and the fungus receives transport into its final host.

=== Predatory relationships with oak trees ===
By acting as a vector for R. quercivora, the oak ambrosia beetle has killed trees since the 1980s. This species attacks all trees and logs but prefers debilitated trees and fresh logs for rearing offspring. Typically, infestation rates are high, possibly to efficiently utilize sparse resources. Working together with the fungi they vector, the ambrosia beetle galleries disrupt the flow of water within trees, leading to necrosis within 2–3 months of the attack. Mass attacks of the beetle are necessary to overcome defense mechanisms of trees. Often, P. quercivorus attacks trees from the family Fagaceae but is known to attack 45 different woody plant species from 27 genera in 17 families.

Infestation occurs in stages. First, trees surrounding previously infested trees are infested early in the season. Then, major infestation occurs from the epicentre formed at the upper forest margin or at a forest edge, which then spreads downward into the remaining forest.

== Dispersal ==
These individuals spread through long-distance dispersal and diffusion. Endemic populations are limited to weakened, old, and highly stressed tree populations but will attack healthy trees once local P. quercivorus populations reach an overcrowded threshold. Infestation happens quickly and parallels invasive species with no regulating factors.

This species may grow in population size and numbers in sudden outbreaks. These sudden outbreaks may be due to climatic and biological factors that cause host trees to reduce the amount of sap they secrete through parasite-induced necrosis, which is their main defense mechanism to control P. quercivorus populations. Additionally, habitats with an abundance of suitable host plants may encourage population outbreaks. Populations form through the use of pheromones released by members of the species in order to attract more individuals to overcome the tree's defenses.

From analyzing interception trap results, oak ambrosia beetles are known to move upwards along slopes. Typically, adult movement is influenced by environmental factors such as light, wind, and gravity. It is thought that upward movement of wind majorly influences P. quercivorus movement. Additionally, oak ambrosia beetles have positive phototaxis and fly more near forest edges. Adults tend to concentrate near upper edges of forests and have a gradient population along slopes. This species is labelled as an edge species due to its preference for edge habitat.

== Control techniques ==
Although not yet implemented, researchers suggest that protecting frequently attacked trees is important. One way to do this is by binding the trunks with vinyl sheets which will prevent the beetle from boring into trees and transmitting the fungus. Researchers understand that not all trees should be protected but those with a high probability of being attacked should be. Trees from the family Fagaceae that have a larger DBH, are in clumps, and are on edges near excess light should be included in the protection plan.
