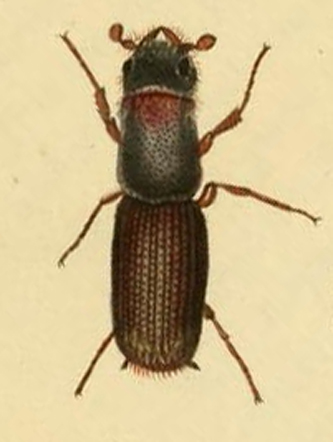
- Illustration by John Curtis

Scientific classification
- Kingdom: Animalia
- Phylum: Arthropoda
- Clade: Pancrustacea
- Class: Insecta
- Order: Coleoptera
- Suborder: Polyphaga
- Infraorder: Cucujiformia
- Superfamily: Curculionoidea
- Family: Curculionidae
- Genus: Platypus
- Species: P. cylindrus

Binomial name
- Platypus cylindrus (Fabricius, 1792)

= Platypus cylindrus =

Species of beetle

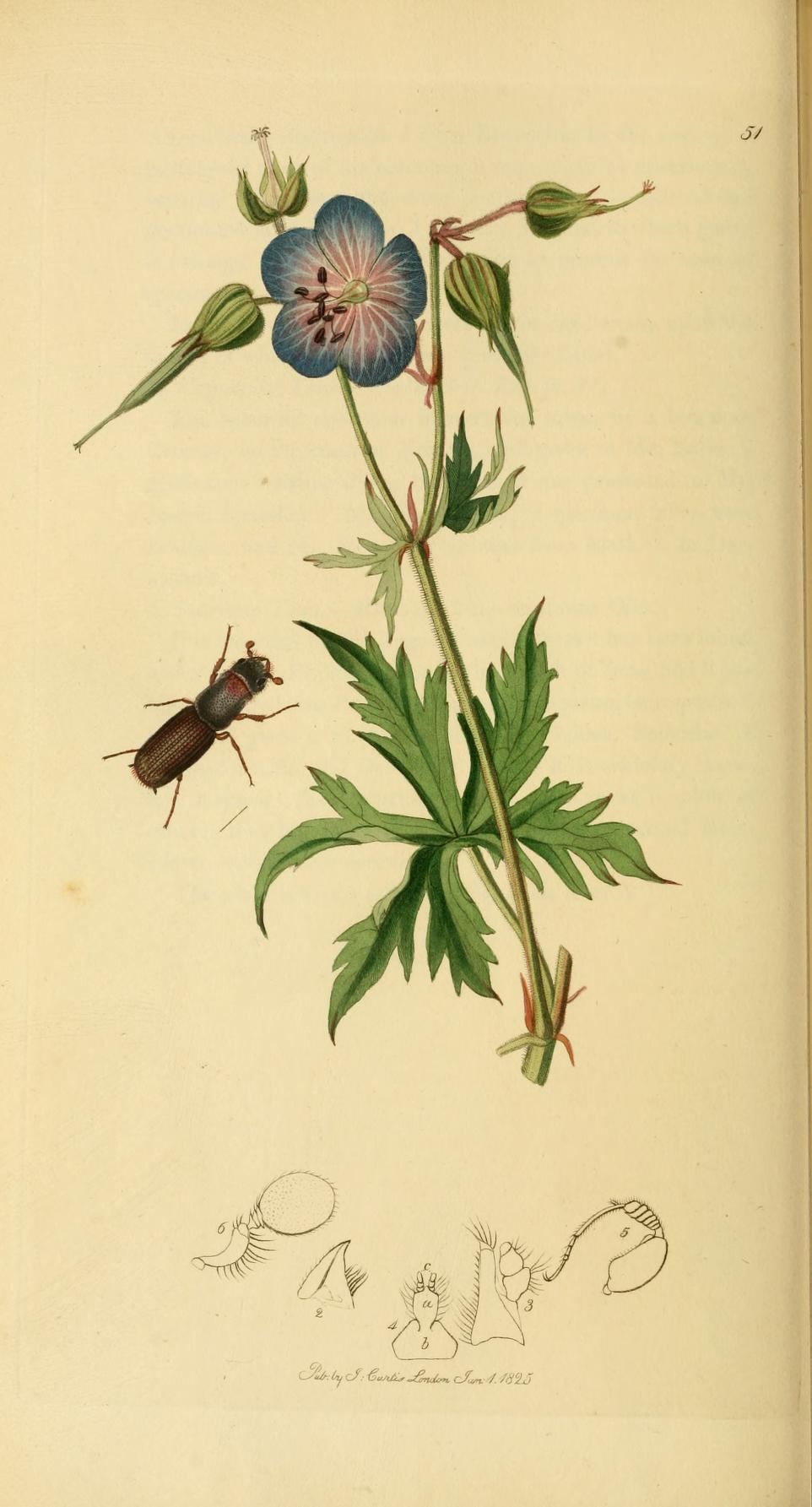
Illustration by John Curtis

Platypus cylindrus, commonly known as the oak pinhole borer, is a species of ambrosia beetle in the weevil subfamily Platypodinae. The adults and larvae burrow under the bark of mature oak trees. It is native to Europe.

== Description ==
The adult oak pinhole borer is between 6 and 8 mm (0.2 and 0.3 in) long, being cylindrical In cross section (hence cylindrus) and, seen from above, shaped like a long, narrow rectangle. Its colour is very deep brown to black. The larvae are yellowish-white, legless grubs.

== Distribution ==
The oak pinhole beetle is native to Europe. It used to be considered rare in Britain, but after the Great Storm of 1987, when many trees were blown down in southern England, it took advantage of the abundant supply of timber and became much more common.

== Ecology ==
The oak pinhole borer infests mature trees, favouring stressed, dying or dead standing trees, fallen trees and logs; the insects choose a sick or moribund tree, but their activities do not kill trees. Besides oak trees, they can infest other hardwood trees, including beech, sweet chestnut, ash, elm and walnut. The adults can mature at any time of year but are at their most active from July to September. At this time of year, the male excavates a hole a few centimetres deep. The female goes inside and then emerges, with mating taking place on the surface of the bark. The female then re-enters the hole and the male follows. The female extends the tunnel further, working radially, and the male pushes the wood fragments out, leaving a pile of frass. This residue is fine and soft which distinguishes it from the more granular, coarser material produced by most wood-boring beetles. The walls of the gallery soon become covered with a layer of ambrosia fungi, spores having been introduced on the body surface of the beetles. This symbiotic fungus is only found in the galleries made by ambrosia beetles and provides them and their larvae with nourishment; they do not feed on the wood.

After about four weeks of tunnelling, the female lays a batch of eggs, and lays further batches at irregular intervals during her two or three-year lifespan. She also continues tunnelling, and the branching galleries may extend for as much as 1.8 m (6 ft). The eggs hatch after two to six weeks. The larvae pass through four or five instar stages and feed on the ambrosia fungus. The later instars have powerful jaws and extend the tunnel system further, although they tunnel more slowly than the female; the frass they produce is coarser than that produced by adults. The larval stage lasts for about two years, then the larvae create small chambers in which they pupate, later emerging into the open air as adults without doing any more tunnelling. Several generations of beetle may occupy one tunnel system.

== Damage ==
The tunnels made by the oak pinhole borer are about 1.6 mm (0.06 in) in diameter and do not weaken the timber to any great extent. However, they do spoil the appearance of veneers, and the ambrosia fungus produces black staining. The beetles and larvae continue their tunnelling activities in stacked timber, and although at first they only burrow through the sapwood, later they move on to the heartwood. Insecticides have no effect on adults and larvae inside their tunnels, but kiln drying of the timber can kill them when the fungus is unable to survive the desiccation.
