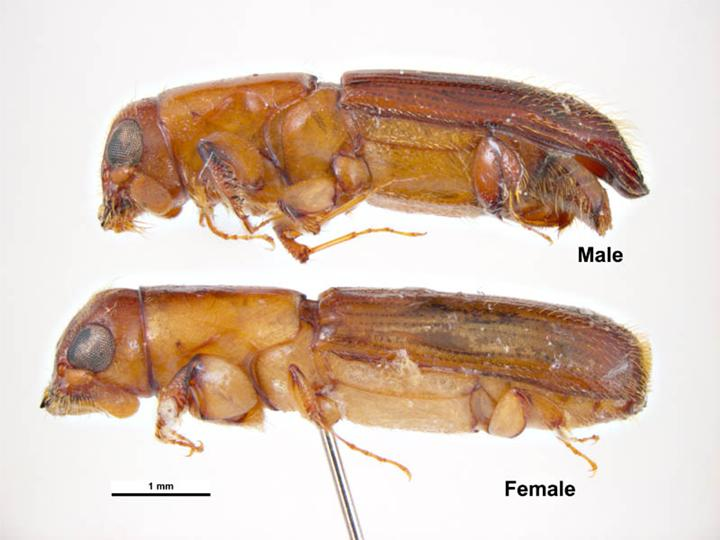

Scientific classification
- Domain: Eukaryota
- Kingdom: Animalia
- Phylum: Arthropoda
- Class: Insecta
- Order: Coleoptera
- Suborder: Polyphaga
- Infraorder: Cucujiformia
- Family: Curculionidae
- Genus: Platypus
- Species: P. australis

Binomial name
- Platypus australis Chapuis, 1865

= Platypus australis =

Species of beetle

Platypus australis, commonly known as the polyphagous pinhole borer, is a species of ambrosia beetle in the weevil family Curculionidae found in Australia. It only eats superficial layers of wood, hence the damage is trivial. '
