= Raffaelea quercivora =

Scientific classification
- Kingdom: Fungi
- Division: Ascomycota
- Class: Sordariomycetes
- Order: Ophiostomatales
- Family: Ophiostomataceae
- Genus: Raffaelea
- Species: R. quercivora

Binomial name
- Raffaelea quercivora Kubono & Ito (2002)

Species of fungus

Raffaelea quercivora is a species of fungus in the family Ophiostomataceae. It causes Japanese oak wilt disease, and is spread by the ambrosia beetle (Platypus quercivorus). It has small obovoid to pyriform sympodioconidia and slender, long conidiophores. The fungus has been isolated from the body surfaces and mycangia of the beetle.
