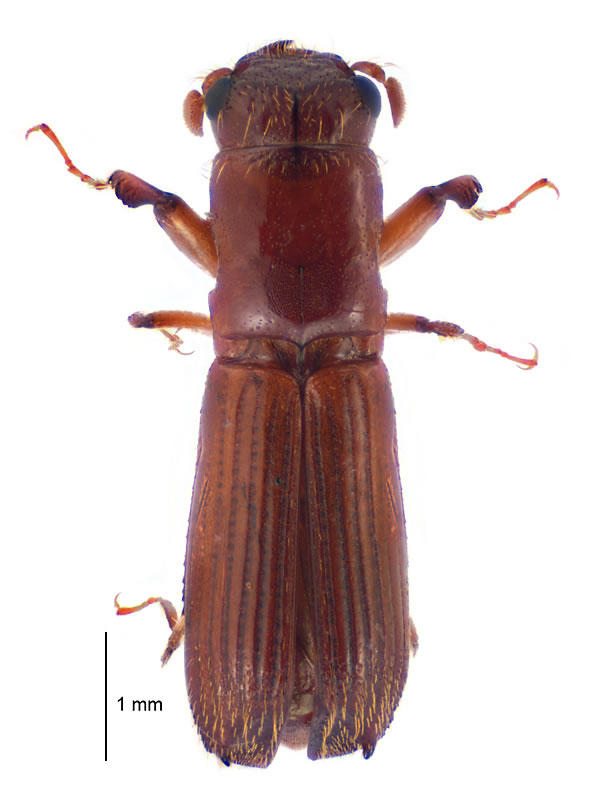

Scientific classification
- Kingdom: Animalia
- Phylum: Arthropoda
- Clade: Pancrustacea
- Class: Insecta
- Order: Coleoptera
- Suborder: Polyphaga
- Infraorder: Cucujiformia
- Family: Curculionidae
- Genus: Platypus
- Species: P. apicalis

Binomial name
- Platypus apicalis White, 1846

= Platypus apicalis =

Wood-boring beetle endemic to New Zealand

Platypus apicalis, known by its common name the New Zealand pinhole boring beetle, is a wood-boring beetle endemic to New Zealand and found throughout the North and South Island in a range of environment.

== Description ==
The colour of Platypus apicalis is mainly dark-brown, with yellow basal joint of antennae, metathorax and femora. The body is cylindrical in cross section and greatly elongated from front to rear. It is less than 2 mmm wide and about 5.8 mm long. The mandibles of adults are oriented downward. The terminal segment of the antennae is dorso-ventrally flattened and larger than the other antennal segments. The mesothoracic wings are modified into a hardened wing case. A narrow longitudinal groove is present on the middle of the pronotum. The elytra bear parallel longitudinal grooves, are mainly smooth but pubescent at their rear end and sides, and are sloping downward at their posterior end.

Platypus apicalis exhibits sexual dimorphism. The elytrae of males bear tooth like projections at their posterior end. The body of females is more pubescent than this of males, lack elytral teeth, and have a more rounded shape. Adult males release a strong and distinguishable odor to attract a female upon digging a breeding gallery. Females have not been found to release this scent.

Eggs are round, less than 1 mm in diameter, and have a creamy appearance. Young larvae are flat and have fleshy projections on sides. In contrast, fully grown larvae are white, cylindrical and legless with yellow coloured heads. At this stage the mandibles begin to orient downward and ridges start to appear on the top of the prothorax.

== Distribution ==
=== Natural range ===
Platypus apicalis only occurs in New Zealand. More specifically, it occurs on the West coast of the South Island and the centre of the North Island in natural beech wood forests and in certain exotic plantations, such as these of eucalyptus.

=== Habitat preferences ===
The habitat preference of this species is predominantly dead beech wood forest, including Red Beech, Silver Beech and Black beech. Platypus apicalis appear in dead tissues surrounding trees and larvae. Few fungi are related to pinhole borer closely, they benefit beetles in different ways. Ambrosia fungi provide food that they depend on. Pathogenic fungi which can infect or even kill live tree is carried by insects. The beetle has no preference for hard or soft wood as it resides inside the Beech trees and some Eucalyptus species. Platypus resides in the dead wood of the tree but when numbers grow due to sufficient breeding material, healthy trees are threatened by their invasion. They are considered pests at times to native forests but only when they threaten healthy trees. Their main pest area is the forestry plantations where they colonise and render some high-quality timber useless due to imperfections and colour change in the timber. Their nests are more likely to kill the part of living tree. The beetles occur commonly along the North Island, South Island and Chatham Island, however, has not spotted in some eastern forests such as Balmoral and Eyrewell State forests, Canterbury

=== Economic significance ===
Platypus apicalis can be a pest in high-quality timber plantations. It vectors fungi that develop into the wood, altering its color. In addition, their tunnels, which go deep into the wood, create imperfections in the finished timber, which also weakens it.

== Life cycle/phenology ==
The life cycle begins with a male adult boring a tunnel into a host tree and releasing fungal spores along the way. Fungal species, particularly ambrosia fungi, serve as the primary food for the beetle, which gives the name of the nickname to the beetle, "Ambrosia Beetles". This tunneling process usually occurs within the early summer months of November and December. Once the tunnel is several centimetres long, the insect will release an odour that acts as an attractant to female insects. If enough male beetles do this at once, it leads to so called "mass attacks" on trees where swarms of beetles attack a single host specimen. However, not like the other bark beetles that they rely on the inner tunnel, adults and larvae both will soon acquire the primary food. During the feeding stage, yeasts are likewise transmitted by bark beetles, but their precise role has not been discovered yet. Copulation occurs at the tunnel entrance and afterward the female goes into the tunnel and begins the process of making a nest. The male continues to enlarge the tunnel and remove excess frass (excreta). The tunnel is initially radial but eventually has a sharp right angle and moves towards the heartwood of a tree. Meanwhile the female lays the first batch of egg containing four to seven eggs. Following this, another branch of the tunnel is then started by the male and eventually a second egg batch is laid. The pair will feed the larvae until they reach maturity using specialized structures called mycangia, which is located on the head of the adult. At this point 8–10 months have passed since copulation.

While the exact time of larval hatching is not yet certain, it is known that there is a period of two years from the time the nest is laid to the time that fully grown beetles emerge from hosts. During this time the larvae go through several stages. Initially the larva simply extend the tunnels of the parents. These extensions differ from the parents in that the tunnels are concave rather than flat. During this time, the larvae grow bigger in size and begin to take on some adult features. After a period of several months, the larva excavate pupal chambers within the tree. The larvae then enter the chambers and become pupas, intermediate insect form. Finally, when two years have passed since the egg laying, adult beetles emerge from the chambers and exit the tree. This occurs during the summer months of January to March. The average number of beetles per tree is 115. The adult beetles then go out into the forest and look for a new host tree. The lifecycle is then repeated. The average lifespan of an adult pinhole beetle is estimated to be 3–4 years.

== Diet and foraging ==
Platypus apicalis is classified as an ambrosia wood-boring beetle. Beetles in the category survive by boring tunnels into the xylem (water transport tissue) and phloem (food transport tissue) of a host tree species. Ambrosia beetles have a symbiotic relationship with a category of fungus known as Ambrosia. Fungal spores are contained within the gut of Ambrosia beetles and as beetles bore into a tree, they release the spores. The fungus is then cultivated within the tree and used by the beetles as a food sources. The xylem and phloem tissue of the tree is merely a medium for the fungus, it is not a source of food for the beetle. Platypus aplicalis do not feed on the wood they bore, instead they eat the yeast that accumulates on the bored tunnels. This yeast provides a steady diet for both adults and larvae (.

== Predators, parasites, and diseases ==
Along with the Ambrosia fungi, pathogenic fungi is associated with the fully grown beetles. This fungi has been known to infect and kill the host tree when it is attacked by the adult beetles. Populations of the insect are currently controlled by agricultural cultural practices; there are no effective predators of the insect; there is a species of parasitic nematode known to situate with the insect, but its effectiveness in population control is unknown. Scientists have tested strains of B. bassiana, B. brongniartii and Metarhizium anisopliae which are found in southern beech forests or in places where no Platypus are found. They were tested on both the adult and larvae stages of the insect, a total of 10 isolates where tested and scientists found that all killed the adult stage of the insect. This provides a natural and common control method that could be used in the future to help control the population of the Platypus apicali.

== Other information ==
New Zealand Platypus species Platypus apicalis, Platypus caviceps and Platypus gracilis have an imperative impact in transmitting airborne and water-borne spore to contaminate the injuries, as there would be no effect from atmosphere on organisms developing in many parts of the nation. Spores can be either liberated from mycelium creating on the surface of corrupted trees or other wood surfaces or by wind-borne frass sullied with spores and mycelial parts from frightening little creature tunneling in polluted tissue. There is in like manner the affirmation of underground spread, probably through either root joins root contact or underground vectors. displayed that C. australis was not subject to P. subgranosus for transmission or for entry to the trees, despite the way that P. subgranosus are of critical in ailment spread through opportunity of polluted frass and the making of wounds in concentrated on trees

== Economic impacts ==
Platypus apicalis has both biodiversity and economic impacts. From a biodiversity perspective, the beetles are a threat to beech trees. While some trees have been known to survive, in most cases the combination of the tunnels through the xylem and phloem and the subsequent fungal infection prove lethal. This and the fact that it has no known predators and few parasites makes it a potential threat to beech tree population numbers. There is also the threat of the species escaping New Zealand via exports of lumber. Beech species exist throughout much of the world and it is conceivable that the insect could survive quite well elsewhere. From an economic standpoint, the tree reduces the amount of native timber available. Even if a tree is not killed outright, the invasion often causes defects such as concealed rot pockets and irregular wood cores. Damaged trees are also easy targets for other species of fungi. This not only affects logging companies, but also associated industries.

== Pheromones ==
The New Zealand Pinhole Borer beetle is technically a wood-boring beetle, but its pheromones more closely resemble bark beetles because it retains an aggression pheromone, allowing Platypus apicalis to cause large-scale mortality to their hosts. This chemical is produced in their hind gut.
