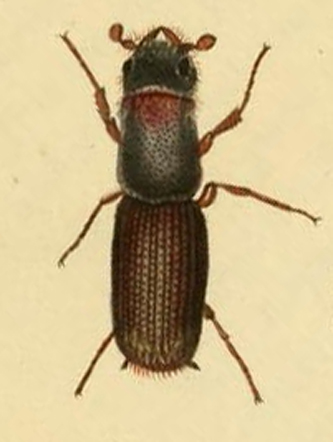
- Platypus cylindrus

Scientific classification
- Kingdom: Animalia
- Phylum: Arthropoda
- Class: Insecta
- Order: Coleoptera
- Suborder: Polyphaga
- Infraorder: Cucujiformia
- Family: Curculionidae
- Subfamily: Platypodinae
- Tribe: Platypodini
- Genus: Platypus; Herbst, 1793

Species
- See text

= Platypus (beetle) =

Genus of beetles

Platypus is a weevil genus in the subfamily Platypodinae.

== Species ==
- Platypus apicalis White, 1846
- Platypus australis Chapuis, 1865
- Platypus calamus
- Platypus cylindrus (Fabricius, 1792)
- Platypus contaminatus
- Platypus gracilis
- Platypus hamatus
- Platypus kiushuensis
- Platypus lewisi
- Platypus modestus
- Platypus quercivorus Murayama, 1925
- Platypus severini
- Platypus solidus
- Platypus taiwansis
