= Crop scouting =

Agricultural pest management strategy

Crop scouting is the process of precisely assessing pest pressure (typically insects) and crop performance to evaluate economic risk from pest infestations and disease, as well as to determine the potential effectiveness of pest and disease control interventions. Scouting is usually sold as a commercial service to farmers as part of Integrated pest management. New tools are available to increase the effectiveness of crop scouting, including specialized field instruments and handheld computers with GPS, enabling geotagging of crop problems. There exists a new generation of crop scouting systems that enables growers and crop consultants to precisely and accurately locate and tag crop issues, visualize them on an aerial map and make decisions for site-specific treatments.

== Preparation ==
Before starting any actual scouting, preparation is essential to provide accurate information in an efficient manner. Crop scouting is an Integrated pest management strategy that looks at many different aspects of crop production, not just any single pest or problem. Scouts must be actively observing environmental conditions, beneficial insects, pest insects, diseases, weeds, crop growth stage, and the general health of the crop in question to get a complete picture of any problems. Since field and landscape characteristics affect pest distribution, symptom expression, crop injury, and crop recovery, it is important to develop a complete field history in order to properly assess and plan management strategies.

== Field history ==
A Field History Form should be completed before the planting season begins; farmers may not be available for a more thorough history prior to the season's start. This history is important because it acts as a reference when accurately diagnosing symptoms caused by pests, nutrient deficiencies and toxicities, chemical application, and unfavorable environmental conditions.

This form should contain the following information: field location, farmer's preferred field name or number, cropping history, including specific variety and seed manufacturer, planting date, planting rate (spacing), row width, tillage operations, crop yields, pesticide names, rates, application dates and who applied them, fertilizer and lime applications and rates, weather patterns, soil type, soil test records (N, P, K, percent organic matter, and pH), irrigation availability, major pest problems, and anything else that could make scouting more effective. This history is very important when assessing signs of crop injuries, because they are generally ambiguous since similar abnormalities can have unrelated causes.

== Equipment ==
It is best to always be prepared when entering the field, as one never know what kind of issues one will find. Scouts often carry the following with them into the field: Scout Report Forms; a clipboard and writing utensils; pocket knife (splitting stalks and cutworm scouting); magnifying glass for accurate pest ID, containers (bags, vials, etc.) for collecting plant and insect specimens or soil and water samples; mechanical hand counter (for accurately counting number of pests, etc.); and measuring tape. Additionally, scouts often keep the following close by: reference materials, which contain high quality photos and descriptive keys as well as various stages of pest and weed development; a spade and shovel; a cooler with ice (for specimen preservation), and a hand held pH meter. As scouts tend to visit more fields within one day, they also should be aware that they are potentially carrying pests from one field to the next;they should take the necessary precautions concerning their outfit(s)

== Scouting frequency ==
The frequency with which fields are scouted depends on the type of crop grown, stage of crop life cycle, present and expected pest(s) and their lifecycle, and environmental conditions (weather). Based on these variables, field visits should be planned to ensure that crop establishes itself, that growth proceeds with healthy development and does not proceed into a population bottleneck, and that pests do not pass the economic threshold level, after which they could become a major problem. This is generally not a problem after the crop has reached a specific stage in development (specific to variety), so the number of visits can be reduced. Frequency of visits to problem fields should not be reduced, and these fields should be strictly monitored.

== Scouting patterns ==
Since covering the entire population of a whole field would take much time, sample populations must be surveyed to ensure quick and efficient data collection and distribution. Sampling patterns are completely randomized to ensure that each subdivision in a field has an equal chance of being sampled. Restrictions to these randomized sampling techniques are imposed to correct the possible error of oversampling in a specific area, and to make sure that all areas of the field are sampled.

Some of the most common randomized patterns are a predetermined zigzag or M-shaped route through rectangular shaped fields. Routes for irregular shaped fields should be made, ensuring that every subdivision of the field is visited, these randomized routes are field specific. Scouting along the edge of a field should not be practiced unless for specific pests, this kind of sampling usually does not show the baring of effects on the whole field.

== Scouting report ==
A scouting report should be filled out every time a field is scouted even if no serious problems are found, as farmers are often interested in crop health and growth stage. A copy of the scouting report should be left with the grower so that they can take the appropriate actions, a second copy should be given to the scout manager, and third copy should stay with the scout so that they can look back at past reports if needed. The scouting report includes the following: field description, pest observations, crop and field observations, comments and a field map.
