= Japanese oak wilt =

Fungal disease of oak trees

Japanese oak wilt (also called mortality of oak trees in Japan) is a fungal disease caused by Raffaelea quercivora fungus affecting by oak trees. In 1998, Japanese plant pathologists group was isolation, inoculation and reisolation the dead tree. It is the first disease known that Raffaela fungus cause plant disease.

== Symptoms ==
The first obvious symptom was that the leaves wilted, and many small holes appeared on the trunk. The leaves turned to red and died back quickly (1 or 2 weeks), and finally the tree died. If you cut the dead tree, you would discover the xylem had been discolored to brown.

== Mechanism ==
The oak trees react plugging their xylem with gum and tyloses for blocking the fungus spreading. It's the same reaction of elm vs. Opiostoma fungus at Dutch elm disease.

== Treatment ==
JOW treatment is resemble other fungus insect vector diseases such as Dutch elm disease or Pine wilt.

=== Exterminate beetle ===
The majority of this disease treatment is cut down the dead oak trees, and killed the vector ambrosia beetles by burned timber or infused insecticide.

=== Exterminate fungus ===
Some fungicide are developing and trying to inoculation.

== See also ==
- Bark beetle, Ambrosia beetle

=== Raffaelea disease ===
- Laurel wilt - caused by R. lauricola, and R. canadensis
- Korean oak wilt - caused by R. quercus-mongolicae

=== Several tree wilt disease in the world ===
- Dutch elm disease
- Pine wilt

=== Mortality of oaks ===
- Oak wilt
- Sudden oak death
