= Wound response in plants =

Plants are constantly exposed to different stresses that result in wounding. Plants have adapted to defend themselves against wounding events, like herbivore attacks or environmental stresses. There are many defense mechanisms that plants rely on to help fight off pathogens and subsequent infections. Wounding responses can be local, like the deposition of callose, and others are systemic, which involve a variety of hormones like jasmonic acid and abscisic acid.

== Overview ==
There are many forms of defense that plants use to respond to wounding events. There are physical defense mechanisms that some plants utilize, through structural components, like lignin and the cuticle. The structure of a plant cell wall is incredibly important for wound responses, as both protect the plant from pathogenic infections by preventing various molecules from entering the cell.

Plants are capable of activating innate immunity, by responding to wounding events with damage-associated Molecular Patterns (DAMPs). Additionally, plants rely on microbe-associated molecular patterns (MAMPs) to defend themselves upon sensing a wounding event. There are examples of both rapid and delayed wound responses, depending on where the damage took place.

== MAMPs/ DAMPS & Signaling Pathways ==
Plants have pattern recognition receptors (PRRs) that recognize MAMPs, or microbe-associated molecular patterns. Upon entry of a pathogen, plants are vulnerable to infection and lose a fair amount of nutrients to said pathogen. The constitutive defenses are the physical barriers of the plant; including the cuticle or even the metabolites that act toxic and deter herbivores. Plants maintain an ability to sense when they have an injured area and induce a defensive response. Within wounded tissues, endogenous molecules become released and become Damage Associated Molecular Patterns (DAMPs), inducing a defensive response. DAMPs are typically caused by insects that feed off the plant. Such responses to wounds are found at the site of the wound and also systemically. These are mediated by hormones.[1]

As a plant senses a wound, it immediately sends a signal for innate immunity. These signals are controlled by hormones such as jasmonic acid, ethylene and abscisic acid. Jasmonic acid induces the prosystemin gene along with other defense related genes such as abscisic acid, and ethylene, contributing to a rapid induction of defense responses. Other physical factors also play a vital role in wound signaling, which include hydraulic pressure and electrical pulses. Most of these that are involved within wound signaling also function in signaling other defense responses. Cross-talk events regulate the activation of different roles.

== Callose, Damaged Sieve Tube Elements, and P-Proteins ==
Sieve elements are very rich in sugars and various organic molecules. Plants don't want to lose these sugars when the sieve elements get damaged, as the molecules are a very large energy investment. The plants have both short-term and long-term mechanisms to prevent sieve element sap loss. The short-term mechanism involves sap proteins, and the long-term mechanism involves callose, which helps to close the open channels in broken sieve plates.

The main mechanism for closing damaged sieve elements involves P-proteins, which act as a plug in the sieve element pores. P-proteins essentially plug the pores that form in sieve elements. They act as a stopper in the damaged sieve elements by blocking the open channels so that no additional sap or sugar can be lost.

A longer-term solution to wounded sieve tube elements involves the production of callose at the sieve pores. Callose is a β-1,3 glucan synthesized by callose synthase, which is an enzyme that's localized within the plasma membrane. Callose gets synthesized after the sieve tube elements undergo damage and/or stress. The use of wound callose occurs when callose gets deposited following sieve element damage. Wound callose is proven to first be deposited at the sieve plate pores, or the intracellular connections, where it then spreads to different regions. Essentially, wound callose seals off the parts that were damaged, and separates them from the parts that are still healthy and not broken. Once the sieve elements get fixed, the callose is always dissipated by callose-hydrolyzing enzyme. Callose is also synthesized during normal plant growth and development, and it typically responds to things like high temperatures, or allows the plant to prepare for more dormant seasons.

When the sieve elements get damaged, the sap, sugar, and other molecules inside rush to the end that was damaged. If there was no mechanism to stop the sugars from leaking out the plant would lose an incredibly large amount of invested energy.

== Jasmonic Acid ==
Jasmonic acid (JA) is a plant hormone that increases in concentration in response to insect herbivore damage. The rise in JA induces the production of proteins functioning in plant defenses. JA also induces the transcription of multiple genes coding for key enzymes of the major pathways for secondary metabolites. Its structure and synthesis show parallels to oxylipins, which function in inflammatory responses. JA is synthesized by the octadecanoid pathway, which is activated in response to wound-induced signals. It is a derivative of the most rich fatty acid in the lipids of leaf membranes, alpha-linolenic acid. When plants experience mechanical wounding or herbivory, JA is synthesized de novo and induces genome-wide changes in gene expression. JA travels through plants via the phloem, and accumulates in vascular tissue. JA acts as an intracellular signal in order to promote responses in distal tissues. The perception of jasmonate in distal responding leaves is necessary for recognition of the transmissible signal that coordinates responses to wounding stress. JA mutants, which lack the gene encoding jasmonic acid, are killed by insect herbivore damage that would otherwise not harm normal-type plants. Upon the application of JA to the same mutants, resistance is restored. Signaling agents such as ethylene, methyl salicylate, and salicylic acid can pair with JA and enhance JA responses.

== Protections Against Abiotic Stress ==
=== Morphological Changes ===
Plants can protect themselves from abiotic stress in many different ways, and most include a physical change in the plant’s morphology. Phenotypic plasticity is a plant’s ability to alter and adapt its morphology in response to the external environments to protect themselves against stress. One way that plants alter their morphology is by reducing the area of their leaves. Though large and flat leaves are favorable for photosynthesis because there is a larger surface area for the leaf to absorb sunlight, bigger leaves are more vulnerable to environmental stresses. For example, it is easier for water to evaporate off of large surface areas which can rapidly deplete the soil of its water and cause drought stress. Plants will reduce leaf cell division and expansion and alter the shape to reduce leaf area.

Another way that plants alter their morphology to protect against stress is by changing the leaf orientation. Plants can suffer from heat stress if the sun’s rays are too strong. Changing the orientation of their leaves in different directions (parallel or perpendicular) allows plants to reduce damage from intense light. Leaves also wilt in response to stress, because it changes the angle at which the sun hits the leaf. Leaf rolling also minimizes how much of the leaf area is exposed to the sun.

=== Constitutive structures ===
Trichomes are small, hair-like growths on plant leaves and stems which help the plant protect itself. Although not all trichomes are alive (some undergo apoptosis, but their cell walls are still present) they protect the leaf by keeping its surface cool and reducing evaporation. In order for trichomes to successfully protect the plant, they must be dense. Oftentimes, trichomes will appear white on a plant, meaning that they are densely packed and are able to reflect a large amount of light off of the plant to prevent heat and light stress. Although trichomes are used for protection, they can be disadvantageous for plants at times because trichomes may reflect light away from the plant that can be used to photosynthesize.

The cuticle is a layered structure of waxes and hydrocarbons located on the outer layer of the epidermis which also helps protect the plant from stress. Cuticles can also reflect light, like trichomes, which reduces light intensity and heat. Plant cuticles can also limit the diffusion of water and gases from the leaves which helps maintain them under stress conditions. Thicker cuticles have been found to decrease evaporation, so some plants will increase the thickness of their cuticles in response to drought stress.

=== Symbiotic Relationships ===
Plants are also further protected from both abiotic and biotic stresses when plant growth promoting Rhizobacteria (PGPRs) are present. Rhizobacteria are root-colonizing and non-pathogenic, and they form symbiotic relationships with plants that can elicit stress responsive pathways. PGPRs also improve key physiological processes in plants such as water and nutrient uptake, photosynthesis, and source-sink relationships. Bacteria will respond to substances secreted by plant roots and optimize nutrient acquisition for the plant with their own metabolic processes. Though dependent on the strain, most Rhizobacteria will produce major phytohormones such as auxins, gibberellins, cytokinins, abscisic acid (ABA) and ethylene, which stimulate plant growth and increase the plant’s resistance to pathogens. Other substances are also released by Rhizobacteria, including nitric oxide, enzymes, organic acids, and osmolytes.

== See also ==
- Embryo rescue
- Somatic embryogenesis
- Wound healing
- Jasmonic acid
- Herbivore
- Trichome
- Cuticle
- Pathogen
