= Collagen gel contraction assay =

In vitro model of wound contraction

The collagen gel contraction assay is an in vitro model of wound contraction. It is performed using the dermal equivalent model, which consists of dermal fibroblasts seeded into a collagen gel.
