= Dermal equivalent =

The dermal equivalent, also known as dermal replacement or neodermis, is an in vitro model of the dermal layer of skin. There is no specific way of forming a dermal equivalent, however the first dermal equivalent was constructed by seeding dermal fibroblasts into a collagen gel. This gel may then be allowed to contract as a model of wound contraction. This collagen gel contraction assay may be used to screen for treatments which promote or inhibit contraction and thus affect the development of a scar. Other cell types may be incorporated into the dermal equivalent to increase the complexity of the model. For example, keratinocytes may be seeded on the surface to create a skin equivalent, or macrophages may be incorporated to model the inflammatory phase of wound healing.

A number of commercial dermal equivalents with different compositions and development methods are available. These include Integra, AlloDerm, and Dermagraft, among others.

== Purpose ==
Autotransplantation has been common practice for treating individuals who have a need for skin transplants. However, there is the issue of needing repeated grafts or transplants for patients with serious injuries such as burn victims, leading to numerous problems including lack of supply of the skin, preservation, and the possibility of disease transmission. Thus, this prompted for the development of various techniques to create artificial skin, including dermal equivalents.

Now, the use of dermal equivalents has expanded from burn wounds to other areas such as various reconstructive surgeries and treatment of chronic wounds.

=== Risks ===
There are potential risks when it comes to the application of any dermal equivalent, as there is with any skin grafting or skin substitution technique. These concerns include but are not limited to a negative immune response, possible infection, slow healing, pain, and scarring.

== History ==
The development of artificial skin and dermis began in the 20th century. It was prompted by the discovery of the ability to isolate and culture cells in vitro, which was in 1907 by American embryologist Ross Granville Harrison when he was able to isolate and grow embryonic tissues from frogs in his laboratory. In 1975, keratinocytes, which are cells that account for the majority epidermal skin cells, were first isolated and successfully cultured in vitro by James G. Rheinwald and Howard Green. Afterwards, in 1981, bilayer artificial skin or dermal graft was developed by John F. Burke, Ioannis V. Yannas, and other researchers, which was successful in covering “physiologically close to 60% of the body surface.”

Burke’s dermal graft was one of the earliest developments of the dermal equivalent, or “neodermis”. Years later, Integra artificial skin, which is now called Integra Dermal Regeneration Template (IDRT) by Integra LifeSciences, was developed from Burke et al.'s innovation. It became the first commercial product approved by the FDA for dermal replacements and listed as one of the "Significant Medical Device Breakthroughs" in 1996.

== Commercial products and applications ==
There are a variety of dermal equivalents from how they are developed and what they are used for. The following three are some of the most commonly reviewed and assessed dermal equivalents.

=== Integra ===
The initial research of dermal equivalent leading to the Integra product resulted in a bilayer structure consisting of a dermal portion and epidermal portion. The dermal portion is composed of bovine hide collagen and chondroitin 6-sulfate that is crosslinked with glutaraldehyde. The epidermal portion is composed of Silastic covering the dermis. For application, the bilayer structure is placed on the wound after removal of the eschar and left for several days. Then, the epidermal layer is removed and replaced with artificial epidermis. The dermal equivalent, or neodermis layer, is not removed as it is suitable for growth of cells and vessels. The two layer process, however, may potentially lead to an infection due to any unwanted accumulation between the layers. The main and primary use of Integra was for burn victims who required skin grafts.

==== Integra Dermal Regeneration Template ====
Formerly known as Integra artificial skin, Integra Dermal Regeneration Template, or IDRT, was the first FDA approved product for dermal replacements. The Integra Dermal Regeneration Template’s bilayer structure is composed of bovine tendon collagen and chondroitin-6-sulfate for the dermal layer, and polysiloxane for the epidermal layer. The polysiloxane epidermal layer is semipermeable, allowing for the controlled water vapor loss, flexible anti-bacterial support of the wound, and mechanical strength for the dermal equivalent. The dermal layer scaffold promotes vascularization and generation of a neodermis. Similar to its predecessor, the method of application is the same. IDRT has low risks of immunogenic response, as well as low disease transmission.

=== AlloDerm ===
AlloDerm is the first type of acellular dermal matrix (ADM) derived from the skin of cadavers from the collagen fiber network after the removal of the epidermal layer of the cadaveric skin. It is widely used in dental surgeries for gingival grafting, abdominal hernia repair, oculoplastic and orbital surgeries, and breast surgeries. Due to its acellular structure, there is no immunogenic response caused from the application of AlloDerm.

=== Dermagraft ===
Dermagraft is a human fibroblast–derived dermal replacement. It is derived from neonatal dermal fibroblasts implanted into a bioabsorbable polyglactin mesh scaffold along with extracellular matrix proteins that are secreted by the fibroblasts. It can promote re-epithelization, however, there is a potential for antigenic response. Dermagraft is mainly used for the treatment of chronic wounds such as various ulcers including diabetic foot ulcers and venous foot ulcers. It received premarket approval from the FDA in 2001 for the treatment of diabetic foot ulcers.

== See also ==
- Tissue engineering
- Artificial skin
- Regenerative medicine
- Regeneration in humans
