= Scar free healing =

Injury healing process

Scar free healing is the process by which significant injuries can heal without permanent damage to the tissue the injury has affected. In most healing, scars form due to the fibrosis and wound contraction, however in scar free healing, tissue is completely regenerated. During the 1990s, published research on the subject increased; it is a relatively recent term in the literature. Scar free healing occurs in foetal life but the ability progressively diminishes into adulthood. In other animals such as amphibians, however, tissue regeneration occurs, for example as skin regeneration in the adult axolotl.

== Scarring versus scar free healing ==
Scarring takes place in response to damaged or missing tissue following injury due to biological processes or wounding: it is a process that occurs in order to replace the lost tissue. The process of scarring is complex, it involves the inflammatory response and remodelling amongst other cell activities. Many growth factors and cytokines are also involved in the process, as well as extracellular matrix interactions.

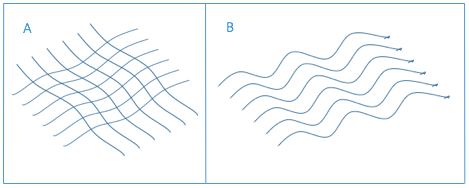
Figure 1: A) Collagen fibres in normal skin 'basket weave'. B) Parallel collagen fibres in scar tissue.

Scarring during healing can create both physical and psychological problems, and is a significant clinical burden. Collagen, for instance, is abnormally organised in scar tissue; collagen in scars is arranged in parallel bundles of collagen fibers, whilst healthy scar free tissue has a "basket weave" structure (Figure 1). The difference in collagen arrangement along with a lack of difference in the dermal tissue when healing has taken place with or without scarring is indicative of regenerative failure of normal skin. Severe scarring resulting from these collagen deposits is known as hypertrophic scarring and is of great concern worldwide with an incidence ranging from 32–72%.

== Scar free healing in nature ==
Unlike the limited regeneration seen in adult humans, many animal groups possess an ability to completely regenerate damaged tissue. Full limb regeneration is seen both in invertebrates (e.g. starfish and flatworms which can regenerate fully functioning appendages) and some vertebrates, however in the latter this is almost always confined to the immature members of the species: an example being tadpoles which can regrow their tails and various other body parts, an ability not seen in the mature frogs. The exception to this is the much studied urodele species' of amphibians, also known as salamanders, which carry their ability of complete regeneration into adulthood. These vertebrates possess an exceptional ability to allow regeneration of entire limbs and their tails (as well as a multitude of their internal organs as well, including their spinal cord) through a process known as blastema formation. This involves covering of the wound by a layer of epithelial cells known as the wound cap and subsequent innervation of this area with nerves that give off signals that revert local differentiated cells (such as muscle, cartilage and connective tissue) back to their undifferentiated cell lineage also known as mesenchymal cells. It is this area that is known as the blastema which has the potential to differentiate and proliferate once again allowing regrowth of the limb similar to how it occurs during development. In wound-healing in urodeles it is the quick response of anti-inflammatory macrophages which have been shown to be key to their regeneration capabilities. In one study, it was found that limbs would not regenerate in those urodeles with depleted macrophages and instead would scar with permanent loss of functionality. Knowing how regeneration occurs in animals such as these may have great implications for how wound-healing is tackled in medicine and research has been aimed at this area, as a result.

== Fetal vs adult healing in humans ==
Reparation of tissue in the mammalian fetus is radically different than the healing mechanisms observed in a healthy adult. During early gestation fetal skin wounds have the remarkable ability to heal rapidly and without scar formation. Wound healing itself is a particularly complex process and the mechanisms by which scarring occurs involves inflammation, fibroplasia, the formation of granulation tissue and finally scar maturation. Since the observation of scar free healing was first reported in the early fetus decades ago, research has focused intently on the underlying mechanisms which separate scarless fetal wound repair from normal adult wound healing.

Scar free healing has been documented in fetuses across the animal kingdom, including mice, rats, monkeys, pigs, and humans. The ability of fetuses to heal without scarring is wound size dependent and also age-dependent, whereby after a specific gestational age, usually 24 weeks in humans, typical scar formation will occur. While the exact mechanisms of scar free healing in the fetus remain unknown, research has shown that it is thought to be due to the complex interaction of the components of the extracellular matrix (ECM), the inflammatory response, cellular mediators and the expression of specific growth factors.

=== Intrauterine environment ===
Originally, it was thought that the intrauterine environment, the sterile amniotic fluid surrounding the embryo, was responsible for fetal scar free healing. Reasoning that embryonic wounds healed scarlessly because they were not exposed to the same contaminating agents which normal adult wounds were exposed to such as bacteria and viruses. However this theory was discredited by investigating fetal wound healing in the pouch of a young marsupial. These pouches can often be exposed to maternal faeces and urine, a highly different environment to the sterile intrauterine environment seen in eutherian embryos. Despite these differences skin wounds on the marsupial healed without the formation of a scar, proving the irrelevance of the embryonic environment in scar free healing.

=== Immune system cells and inflammatory response ===
One of the major differences between embryonic scar-free healing wounds and adult scar-forming wounds is the role played by the cells of the immune system and the inflammatory response.

Table 1: Summary of the major differences identified between fetal and adult wound healing.

	Select Component	Fetal	Adult	Role in Wound Healing
Immune System and Inflammation	IL-10 IL-6/8	High levels Low levels	Low levels High levels	Anti-inflammatory cytokines Pro-inflammatory cytokines
Extracellular Matrix (ECM)	Hyaluronic acid CD44 (hyaluronic acid receptor Tenascin Fibronectin Decorin Fibromodulin Collagen	High levels High levels High levels High levels Low levels High levels Elevated ratio of type 111 to type 1	Low levels Low levels Low levels Low levels High levels Low levels Elevated ratio of type 1 to type 111	Cellular movement, cell-matrix interactions, cell migration Anti-adhesive, anti-proliferative Tissue architecture, cell proliferation/migration, cell matrix interactions Inhibits fibrillogenesis Tissue architecture, ECM remodeling, tensile strength, cell-matrix interactions
Growth Factors	EGF PDGF FGF TGF-β1 TGF-β2 TGF-β3 VEGF	High levels Low levels Low levels Low levels Low levels High levels Low levels	Decreases with age High levels High levels High levels High levels Low levels High levels	Stimulate fibroblasts to secrete collagen Fibroplasia Matrix deposition, fibroblast migration, angiogenesis Infiltration of neutrophils and macrophages, fibroplasia, scarring, fibrosis Infiltration of neutrophils and macrophages, fibroplasia, scarring, fibrosis Possible role in anti-scarring Angiogenesis
Wound Closure		Actin cable	Myofibroblasts	

The fetal immune system can be described as 'immunologically immature' due to the marked reduction in neutrophils, macrophages, monocytes, lymphocytes and also inflammatory mediators, compared with adult wounds. Physiologically, adult and fetal neutrophils differ, due to the fact that the concentration of neutrophils is higher in the adult than the fetus, this results in phagocytosis of the wound and the recruitment and release of inflammatory cytokines. Leading to the promotion of a more aggressive inflammatory response in adult wound healing. It is also thought that the time in which this inflammatory response occurs, is much shorter in the fetus thus limiting any damage.

=== Role of the extracellular matrix and its components ===
Another difference between the healing of embryonic and adult wounds is due to the role of fibroblast cells. Fibroblasts are responsible for the synthesis of the ECM and collagen. In the fetus, fibroblasts are able to migrate at a faster rate than those found in the adult wound. Fetal fibroblasts can also proliferate and synthesize collagen simultaneously, in comparison to adult fibroblasts where collagen synthesis is delayed. It is this delay in both collagen deposition and migration, which is likely to contribute to formation of a scar in the adult.

Proteins and cell surface receptors found in the ECM differ in fetal and adult wound healing. This is due to the early up regulation of cell adhesion proteins such as fibronectin and tenascin in the fetus. During early gestation in the fetal wounds of rabbits, the production of fibronectin occurs around 4 hours after wounding, much faster than in adult wounds where expression of fibronectin does not occur until 12 hours post wounding. The same pattern can be seen in the deposition of tenascin. It is this ability of the fetal fibroblast to quickly express and deposit fibronectin and tenascin, which ultimately allows cell migration and attachment to occur, resulting in an organised matrix with less scarring.

Another major component of the ECM is hyaluronic acid (HA), a glycosaminoglycan. It is known that fetal skin contains more HA than adult skin due to the expression of more HA receptors. The expression of HA is known to down-regulate the recruitment of inflammatory cytokines interleukin-1 (IL-1) and tumour necrosis factor-alpha (TNF-α); since fetal wounds contain a reduced number of pro-inflammatory mediators than adult wounds it is thought that the higher levels of HA in the fetal skin aid in scar free healing.

Analysis using microarrays has also shown that gene expression profiles greatly differ between scar free fetal wounds and postnatal wounds with scar formation. In scarlesss wound healing there is a significant up-regulation in genes associated with cell growth and proliferation, thought to be a major contributing factor to the rapid wound closure seen in the foetus. Whilst wound healing in the fetus has been shown to be completely scarless in an age-dependent manner, adult mammals do not have complete scar free healing but have retained some regenerative properties. Adult regeneration is limited to a number of organs, most notably, the liver.

== Continued regeneration in adult humans ==
There are few examples of regeneration in humans continuing after fetal life in to adulthood. Generally, adult wound healing involves fibrotic processes causing wound contraction which may lead to the formation of scar tissue. In regeneration, however, completely new tissue is synthesized. This can lead to scar free healing where the function and structure of the organ is reinstated. However organ regeneration is not yet fully understood.

Two types of regeneration in human adults are currently recognised; spontaneous and induced.

Spontaneous regeneration occurs naturally at several locations of the human body.

One highly recognised example of this is the regeneration of the liver, which can regenerate up to two thirds of its mass when injured by surgical removal, ischaemia, or after exposure to harmful toxins. (Figure 2)

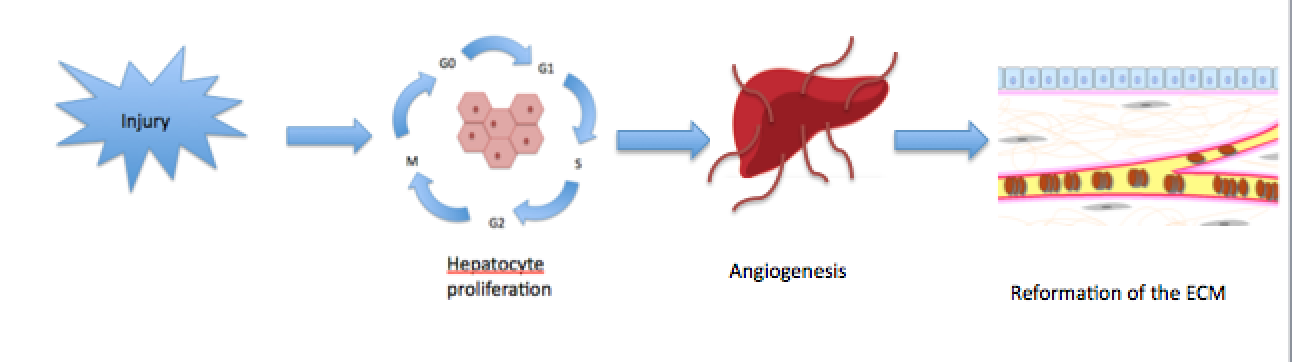
Figure 2: Mechanism of liver regeneration in adult humans

Through this mechanism the liver may be restored to its original state, scar-free. However, despite nearly 80 years of research on liver regeneration much debate still surrounds the exact mechanisms by which the process occurs.

Another example of spontaneous regeneration endometrial lining of the uterus after menses during reproductive years. Endometrial glands from a basal layer of the uterine wall can regenerate the functional layer without fibrosis or scarring.

By 2014 the kidney had been found to have the ability to regenerate. Following removal or incapacitation of one kidney the other may double in size in order to counteract the loss of the other kidney. This is known a compensatory growth.

Induced regeneration stimulated by an outside source of a "non-regenerative" organ. In humans is for therapeutic use. Induced regeneration is being trialled to replace organ transplants as issues such as rejection, lack of donors, and scarring would be eliminated.

The table below details some of the tissues in which induced regeneration has been attempted;

Tissue	Type of Regeneration	Mechanisms of Regeneration and current research tools
Heart Muscle	Induced	Using differentiation of somatic stem cells into cardiomyocytes.
Thymus	Induced	Up regulating FOXN1, which causes increased expression of thymic epithelial cell specific receptor, which regenerates an aged thymus.
Vagina	Induced	Reconstruction of vaginal muscle and epithelial cells using biodegradable scaffolds.
Skin	Induced	Use of a regeneratively active collagen scaffold to prevent wound contraction.
Peripheral Nerve	Induced	Use of a regeneratively active collagen scaffold to prevent wound contraction.

== Clinical burden and implications of scarring ==
Following injury or surgery, a doctor's key aim is to restore full function in a patient and help ensure they return to as close to their original state before their skin trauma or surgery. Ensuring patients return as closely to their original appearance and original function is challenging in the context of scarring. Scar-free healing is yet to be observed in healthy post gestational humans, despite being seen in human embryos. Currently, it is only possible to reduce scar visibility, and the NHS suggests a number of different methods of doing this including corticosteroid injections, skin creams, silicone gels, pressure dressings, dermal fillers, radiotherapy, and laser therapy. Although these methods do reduce a scars visible appearance, they do not result in a scar free appearance. Billions of pounds are spent on wound maintenance and healing on the NHS every year. Between 2014 and 2015 in England and Wales, 19,239 people sustained a burn injury which required hospital care. In addition to the significant financial cost, the cost of scars is immense to the patients too. One study into the quality of life of patients with scars found that over half of the participants felt stigmatised by their scars and felt their personal relationships deteriorated. In addition to this, 68% tried to hide their scars, whilst reporting their work life, self-confidence and ability to communicate with others had been negatively affected. Future research and advances in scar-free healing could lessen the cost to the NHS whilst also improving the quality of life to many people affected.

== See also ==
- Scarless wound healing
