= Skin equivalent =

A skin equivalent is an in vitro skin model using to conduct experiments on processes involving the skin, such as wound healing and keratinocyte migration. It is a more complex form of the dermal equivalent.
