= Granulation tissue =

New tissue that forms on a wound's surface

Granulation tissue is new connective tissue and microscopic blood vessels that form on the surfaces of a wound during the healing process. Granulation tissue typically grows from the base of a wound and is able to fill wounds of almost any size. Examples of granulation tissue can be seen in pyogenic granulomas and pulp polyps. Its histological appearance is characterized by proliferation of fibroblasts and thin-walled, delicate capillaries (angiogenesis), and infiltrated inflammatory cells in a loose extracellular matrix.

== Appearance ==
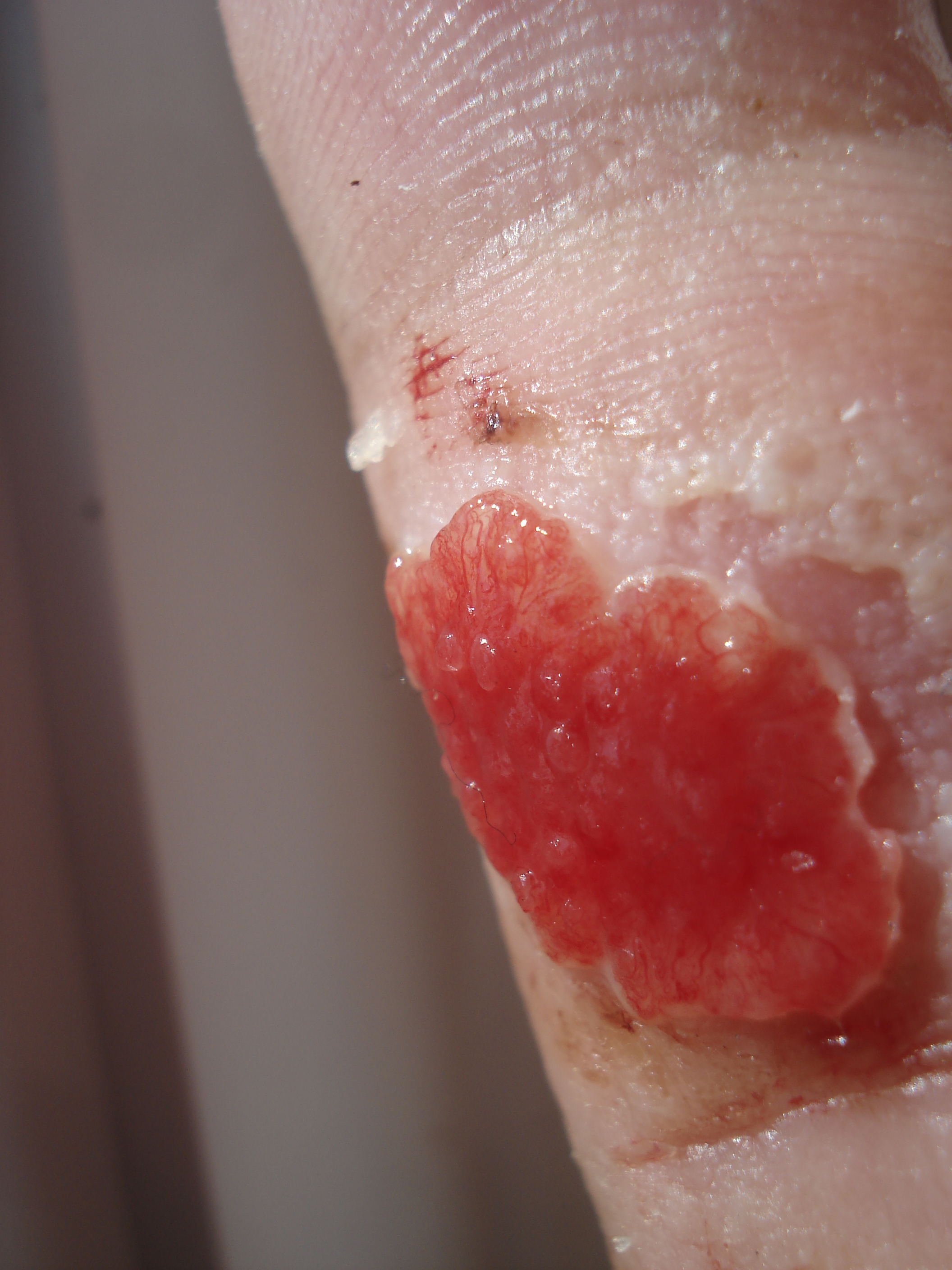
Example of hypergranulating tissue from a cut on a finger.

During the migratory phase of wound healing, granulation tissue is:

- light red or dark pink, being perfused with new capillary loops or "buds";
- soft to the touch;
- moist;
- bumpy (granular) in appearance, due to punctate hemorrhages;
- pulsatile on palpation;
- painless when healthy;

== Structure ==
Granulation tissue is composed of tissue matrix supporting a variety of cell types, most of which can be associated with one of the following functions:

- formation of extracellular matrix;
- operation of the immune system;
- vascularisation;

An excess of granulation tissue (caro luxurians) is informally referred to as hypergranulation or "proud flesh".

=== Extracellular matrix ===
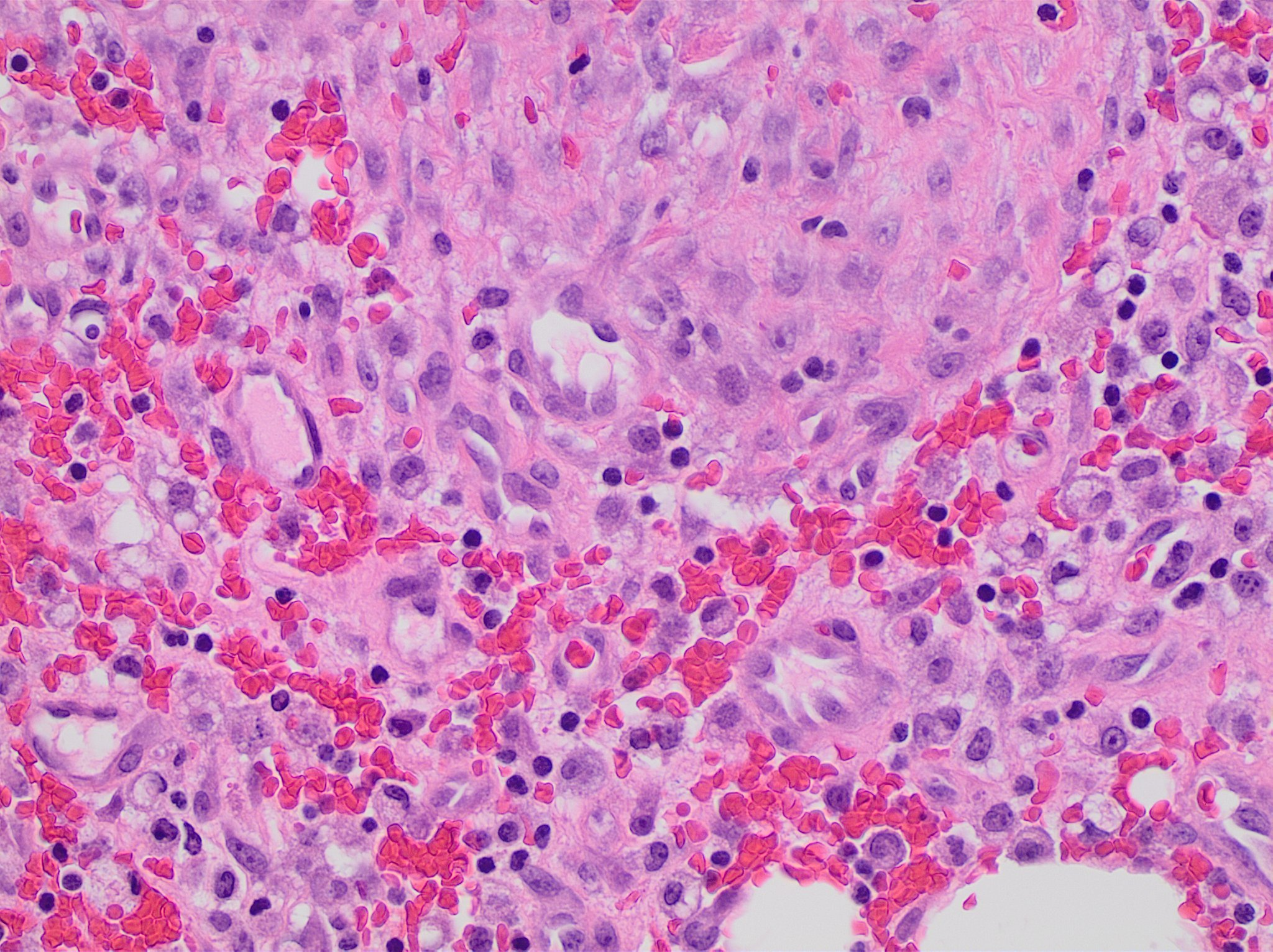
Histopathology of granulation tissue at 11 days after injury, showing fibroblasts, hemorrhage and lymphocytes.

The extracellular matrix of granulation tissue is created and modified by fibroblasts. Initially, it consists of a network of type-III collagen, a weaker form of the structural protein that can be produced rapidly. This is later replaced by the stronger, long-stranded type-I collagen, as evidenced in scar tissue.

=== Immunity ===
The main immune cells active in the tissue are macrophages and neutrophils, although other leukocytes are also present. These work to phagocytize old or damaged tissue, and protect the healing tissue from pathogenic infection. This is necessary both to aid the healing process and to protect against invading pathogens, as the wound often does not have an effective skin barrier to act as a first line of defense.

=== Vascularization ===
It is necessary for a network of blood vessels to be established as soon as possible to provide the growing tissue with nutrients, to take away cellular wastes, and transport new leukocytes to the area. Fibroblasts, the main cells that deposit granulation tissue, depend on oxygen to proliferate and lay down the new extracellular matrix.

In vascularisation, also called angiogenesis, endothelial cells quickly grow into the tissue from older, intact blood vessels. These branch out in a systematic way, forming anastomoses with other vessels.

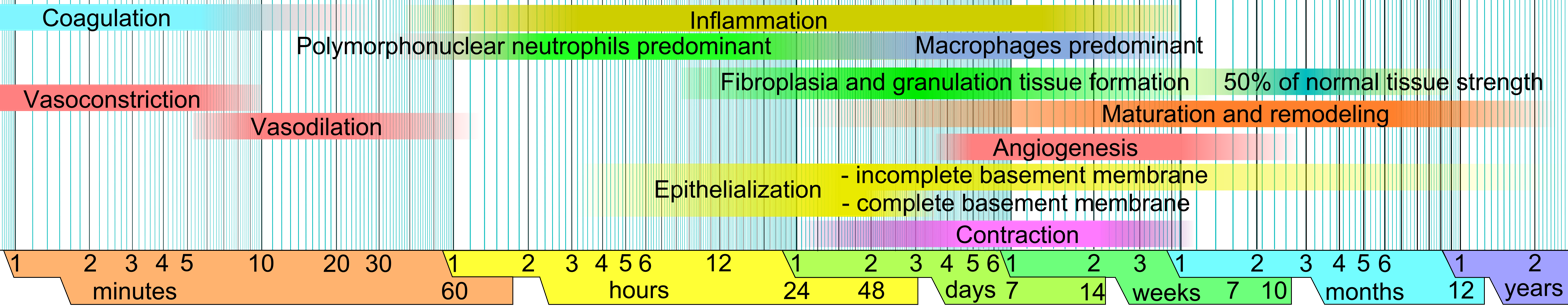
Approximate times of the different phases of wound healing, with substantial variation depending on wound size and healing conditions. Granulation tissue formation is seen in green box at days to weeks.
