= Heparan sulfate analogue =

Heparan sulfate analogues are polymers engineered to mimic several properties of heparan sulfates. They can be constituted with a backbone of polysaccharides, such as poly glucose or glucuronates or a polyester such as co polymers of lactic or malic acid to which sulfates, sulfonate or carboxyl groups are added in controlled amounts and location. They have a molecular weight that can range from a few thousand to several hundred thousand Dalton. Heparan sulfates can sequester growth factors (GFs) and cytokines in the extracellular matrix (ECM) thereby protecting them from degradation. This ensures local presence of these signaling proteins to fulfill their function in the ECM which contributes to the preservation of anatomical form and function. Heparan sulfates bind to matrix proteins on specific sites called "heparan sulfate binding sites" on ECM macromolecules like collagen, fibronectin and laminin, to form a scaffold surrounding the cells and to protect ECM proteins and growth factors from proteolytic degradation by steric hindrance. However, at any site of inflammation, so also in wound areas, heparan sulfates are degraded, mainly by heparanases giving free access to protease to degrade the ECM and a subsequent loss of GFs and cytokines that disrupts the normal tissue homeostasis. Heparan sulfate analogues obtain many of the characteristics of heparan sulfates including the ability to sequester GFs and bind and protect matrix proteins. However, heparan sulfate analogues are resistant to enzymatic degradation. This way they strengthen the healing potential of the wound bed by repositioning GFs and cytokines back into the ECM.

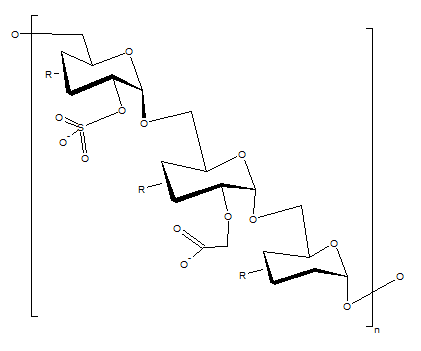
Structure formula of a heparan sulfate analogue subunit such as OTR4120 with a glucose subunit based backbone

== Heparan sulfate analogues ==
Several Heparan sulfate analogues (also known as ReGeneraTing Agents, RGTA) have been developed from a poly glucose backbone. One named OTR4120 is a 85KD biopolymer and used for topical or ophthalmological application and marketed under the name CACIPLIQ20 or CACICOL20, respectively. Heparan sulfate analogues will occupy the free heparan sulfate binding sites on ECM macromolecules like collagen, fibronectin and laminin that become available following heparan sulfate degradation. In many characteristics heparan sulfate analogues are similar to the natural heparan sulfate. The most important difference is their resistance to enzymatic degradation. The resistance of RGTA is caused by the coupling of the subunits internal bond of the molecules. The β1-4 oxygen-linked binding of the subunits of heparan sulfate is prone to enzymatic cleavage whereas the α1-6 carbon-carbon binding of the subunits of RGTA are resistant to cleavage by all known mammalian glycanases and heparanases. This way RGTA can recreate a scaffold with the ECM proteins and will reposition GFs back into the matrix where they can re-unfold their natural action in wound repair. This way heparan sulfate analogues may contribute to chronic wound healing as will be discussed later on.

== Target and function ==
Heparan sulfate analogues are thought to display identical properties as heparan sulfate with exception of being stable in a proteolytic and glycolytic environment like a wound. Because heparan sulfate is broken down in chronic wounds by heparanase, the analogues only bind at sites where natural heparan sulfate is absent. Also the function of the heparan sulfate analogues is the same as heparan sulfate: structuring the ECM scaffold and protecting a variety of protein ligands such as ECM proteins growth factors and cytokines. By positioning and keeping them in place, in a reconstituted organization mimicking that of before the wound, the tissue can then use these different proteins properly and spatially displayed for inducing cell migration, proliferation and differentiation. This results in improved tissue repair and sometimes a real regeneration process.

== Wound repair ==
Normal wound repair consists of three different phases: hemostasis and inflammation, proliferation and tissue remodeling. In disturbed wound healing, these stages cannot be completed often resulting in a reduced anatomical and functional outcome.

Multiple factors determine the average healing time of the different phases. These factors can be classified into local factors such as infection and ischemia, and systemic factors such as age, stress, Diabetes Mellitus and smoking. In chronic wounds, factors as mentioned above, make it impossible for the tissue to regenerate properly. After injury, the extracellular matrix, and thereby also the heparan sulfate is broken down by different local enzymes, produced by macrophages such as, heparanases, serine proteases and metalloproteinases (MMPs). Heparan sulfate analogues replace the broken heparan sulfate at the wound site and bind to the free heparan sulfate binding sites of the extracellular matrix. Heparan sulfate is slightly negatively charged and so it can bind the positively charged units of the proteins and secure the ECM scaffold. That ensures a supply of the different protein ligands at the wound site.

== Clinical use ==
Regenerative medicine is the "process of replacing or regenerating human cells, tissues or organs to restore or establish normal function." Heparan sulfate analogues are one of the early examples of regenerative medicine that reached daily clinical use. Multiple articles of animal wound models demonstrated vast effects on improving wound healing heparan sulfate analogues. These findings formed a rationale for its clinical application. The first clinical studies also show a significant improvement in wound healing. Different cases have shown improvement and better wound healing over time and persistent ulcer healing after usage of heparan sulfate analogues. Even though several studies show that heparan sulfate analogues contribute to the wound healing, more research in the form of a Randomized controlled trial is needed to obtain conclusive evidence.

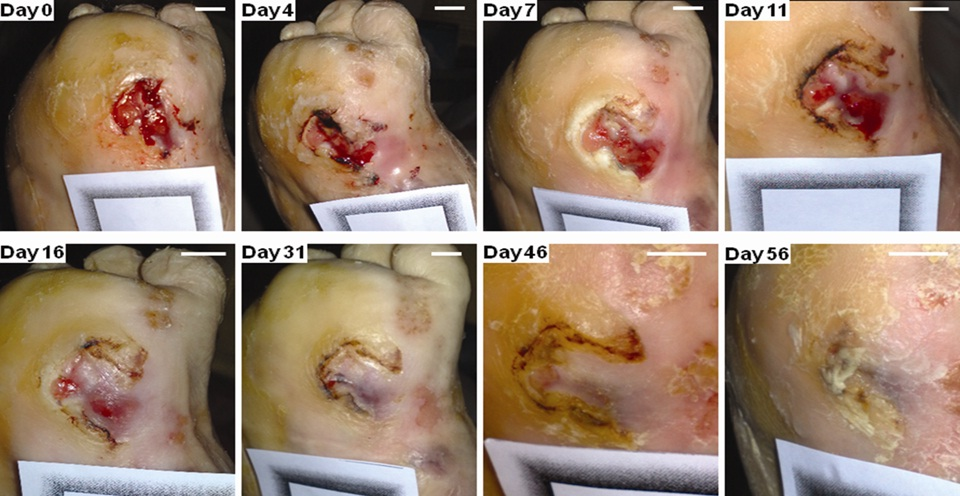
Clinical case of the function of heparan sulfate analogues in a 60 year old diabetic patient

== See also ==
- Heparan sulfate
- Wound healing
- Regenerative medicine
