= Pulp polyp =

Inflammation of dental pulp

A pulp polyp, also known as chronic hyperplastic pulpitis, is a "productive" (i.e., growing) inflammation of dental pulp in which the development of granulation tissue is seen in response to persistent, low-grade mechanical irritation and bacterial invasion of the pulp.

== Pathogenesis ==
Pulp polyps develop as overgrowth of the pulpal tissue resulting in the hyperplastic mass.

Factors which may contribute to the development of a pulp polyp includes:

- Persistence of balance between the irritant and tissue resistance
- Continuous low-grade inflammation
- Well vascularised pulpal tissue with good tissue reactivity
- An open carious cavity
- Young patients with a good immune system
- Wide apical foramen of the affected tooth to prevent the occurrence of pulpal strangulation and necrosis in response to inflammation

== Characteristics ==
Pulp polyps are characterised by overgrowth of the pulp tissue outside the boundary of a tooth's pulp chamber. A pulp polyp may be found in an open carious lesion (tooth cavity), a fractured tooth, or within a cavity with a missing dental restoration. Due to lack of intrapulpal pressure in an open lesion, pulp necrosis does not occur as would be expected in a closed carious cavity. A good vascular supply and immune resistance is required for its development; as such, this condition is more commonly seen in molar teeth of children and young adults and rarely in older age groups.

Clinically, pulp polyps present as a small, pink-red, lobulated mass protruding from the pulp chamber and encompassing the open cavity in long standing cavitated molar teeth. The majority of pulp polyps present symptomless, however if it becomes involved in mastication, discomfort may present and the polyp may change appearance to an ulcerated, dark red mass; although unlikely, bleeding may present.

Pulp polyps usually show no radiographic apical lesions, however in long standing polyps or in those with extensive pulp involvement, chronic apical periodontitis may develop and present as a radiographic peri-apical lesion due to advancement of the inflammation present. Peri-apical lesions may present as widening of the periodontal-ligament space, an apical radiolucency or with no changes.

To differentiate from a polyp of gingival origin, the pulp polyp may be lifted from the walls of the cavity with an excavator revealing the presence of the pedicle with very little or no discomfort experienced by the patient.

== Management ==
There are a number of management options for teeth with pulp polyps. The option chosen depends namely on the amount of sound tooth tissue remaining.

Extraction is usually the only option for teeth with a large carious cavity and little sound tooth tissue remaining; however, if a tooth is deemed restorable (i.e. enough sound tooth tissue) an attempt at restoring the tooth can be made. This may involve a combination of treatments including root surface debridement, endodontic therapy, crown lengthening and/or fixed prosthodontics measures.

The types of endodontic therapy which may be undertaken are either a pulpotomy or a root canal treatment; other than restorability, the option chosen depends on a number of factors including how far the tooth is from root completion, the extent of pulpal involvement and whether it is a primary or permanent tooth.
