= Punctate hemorrhage =

Punctate hemorrhage is a capillary hemorrhage into the skin that forms petechiae.
