= Dermal fibroblast =

Cells responsible for connecting and repairing skin layers

Dermal fibroblasts are cells within the dermis layer of skin which are responsible for generating connective tissue and allowing the skin to recover from injury. Using organelles (particularly the rough endoplasmic reticulum), dermal fibroblasts generate and maintain the connective tissue which unites separate cell layers. Furthermore, these dermal fibroblasts produce the protein molecules including laminin and fibronectin which comprise the extracellular matrix. By creating the extracellular matrix between the dermis and epidermis, fibroblasts allow the epithelial cells of the epidermis to affix the matrix, thereby allowing the epidermal cells to effectively join together to form the top layer of the skin.

== Cell progenitors and analogs ==
Dermal fibroblasts are derived from mesenchymal stem cells within the body. Like corneal fibroblasts, dermal fibroblast proliferation can be stimulated by the presence of fibroblast growth factor (FGF). Fibroblasts do not appear to be fully differentiated or specialized. After examining the CD markers of the fibroblast cells, researchers at BioMed Central discovered that these cell lack "distinctive markers" confirming that these cells can be further differentiated.

One example of further differentiation of dermal fibroblasts is that upon injury, dermal fibroblasts can give rise to myofibroblasts, fibroblast cells with smooth muscle characteristics. Dermal cells differentiate into myofibroblasts by altering their actin gene expression (which is silenced in dermal fibroblasts). When dermal fibroblasts express actin, the cells can slowly contract. This contraction plays a critical role in wound healing and fibrosis. By pulling tissues closed, differentiated myofibroblasts seal the skin after an injury (thereby, preventing infection but inducing scar formation). Myofibroblasts can also be derived from non-fibroblast sources. Based on evidence of α-SMA expression from lung injuries, myofibroblasts can "arise de novo" directly from mesenchymal stem cells.

== Cell function and characteristics ==
Unlike other fibroblast cell types, dermal fibroblasts are far less likely to change into other cell types. For example, when a dermal fibroblast and a corneal fibroblasts are placed in the same concentrations of fibroblast growth factor, dermal fibroblast will not differentiate or change. As noted by Dr. J. Lewis and Dr. A. Johnson authors of Microbiology of the Cell, "fibroblasts from the skin are different" and behave differently from other fibroblast cells to identical chemical stimuli.

Furthermore, dermal fibroblasts are less likely to replicate in either in vivo and in vitro environments than are other fibroblast types. Dermal fibroblasts require far higher concentrations of fibroblast growth factor (FGF) in order to undergo cell replication.

Dermal fibroblasts are responsible for creating the ECM which organizes the stratified squamous epithelial cells of the epidermis into a unified tissue. Furthermore, dermal fibroblasts create long fibrous bands of connective tissue which anchor the skin to the fascia of the body. Therefore, without dermal fibroblasts, the largest and heaviest organ would not tightly adhere to body's frame.

== Clinical Applications ==
Since dermal fibroblasts play a critical role in wound healing, researchers are attempting to generate mature dermal fibroblasts to repair second and third degree burns. When the body sustains a third degree burn, the skin's dermal layer is completely destroyed by heat (and the all fibroblast cells within the wound site perish). Without fibroblasts, the wound site cannot regenerate extracellular matrix and epidermis skin cells cannot proliferate over the wound site. Therefore, without dermal fibroblasts the skin cannot properly recover from injury. Yet, by differentiating mesenchymal stem cells from other regions of the body and injecting them into the wound site, scientists can restore dermal fibroblasts to burned regions of the body. By restoring fibroblasts to the burned regions, the body can restore the ECM within the wound site and recover from the injury. As noted "The injured dermis is also repaired by the recruitment and proliferation of fibroblasts producing extracellular matrix and keratinocyte growth promoting factors."

Similarly, FGF is being inserted into fibrin sealants to enhance the long term repair and sealing of tissue. FGF-1 has been experimentally shown to encourage the body’s own adhesive tissue to develop and effectively seal the wound (thereby stymieing infection and mitigating scar formation). Using FGF stimulate fibroblast activity is a more effective means of sealing tissue than current tissue sealants due to the robust nature of collagen which makes up connective tissue. A study conducted by researchers at the University of Alabama examined the adhesive properties of fibrin tissue adhesives. The tests found that fibrin adhesives even at its intended medical concentration (29 mg/mL at the wound site) had shear strength of only 17.6 kiloPascals. Furthermore, another study performed at the University of California determined that the modulus (the stress/strain) of fibrin adhesives was on average 53.56 kPA. To seal together tissues the human body uses collagen and elastin to obtain superior shear strength. Type I collagen which includes collagen strands bundled into strong fibrils has a unique tri-helical structure which increases the proteins structural integrity. In fact, a study performed by the Department of Medicine in University College London experimentally determined that pure type I collagen has a modulus of 5 GPa to 11.5 GPa. Therefore, pure type I collagen has nearly one million times greater structural integrity than fibrin. Collagen is therefore much harder to deform than fibrin, and collagen fibers create much stronger bonds between tissues than strands of fibrin polymer.

=== Stem Cells ===
By generating adhesive proteins like fibronectin, fibroblasts are used within research laboratories to help to culture cells which typically demonstrate low survival rates in vitro. For example, fibroblasts have been utilized to increase the survival rate for human stem cells which easily undergo cell apoptosis. As noted by researchers at the Harvard Stem Cell Institute, dermal cell "human keratinocyte [stem cells] could be propagated in vitro when culture on fibroblast feeder cells."

In addition to improving the culture and proliferation of stem cells, dermal fibroblasts can also become stem cells. Although dermal cells demonstrate less plasticity than other fibroblast cell types, researchers can still turn these cells into induced pluripotent cells (IPCs).

As noted by researchers within the Harvard Stem Cell Institute, researchers obtained fibroblasts from a mouse with sickle cell anemia and, using a virus, "reprogrammed these cells into pluripotent [stem cells], corrected the genetic deficiency by homologous recombination, and redirected these pluripotent cells toward the hematopoietic lineages, and transplanted these engineered cells to a lethally irradiated mice." The animals which received the fibroblast stem cell treatment exhibited increased activity levels, indicating recovery from the disorder.

== See also ==
- Fibroblasts
- Corneal keratocyte
- Stem Cells
- Induced pluripotent stem cell
- Cluster of differentiation
- extracellular matrix
- dermis
- hypodermis
