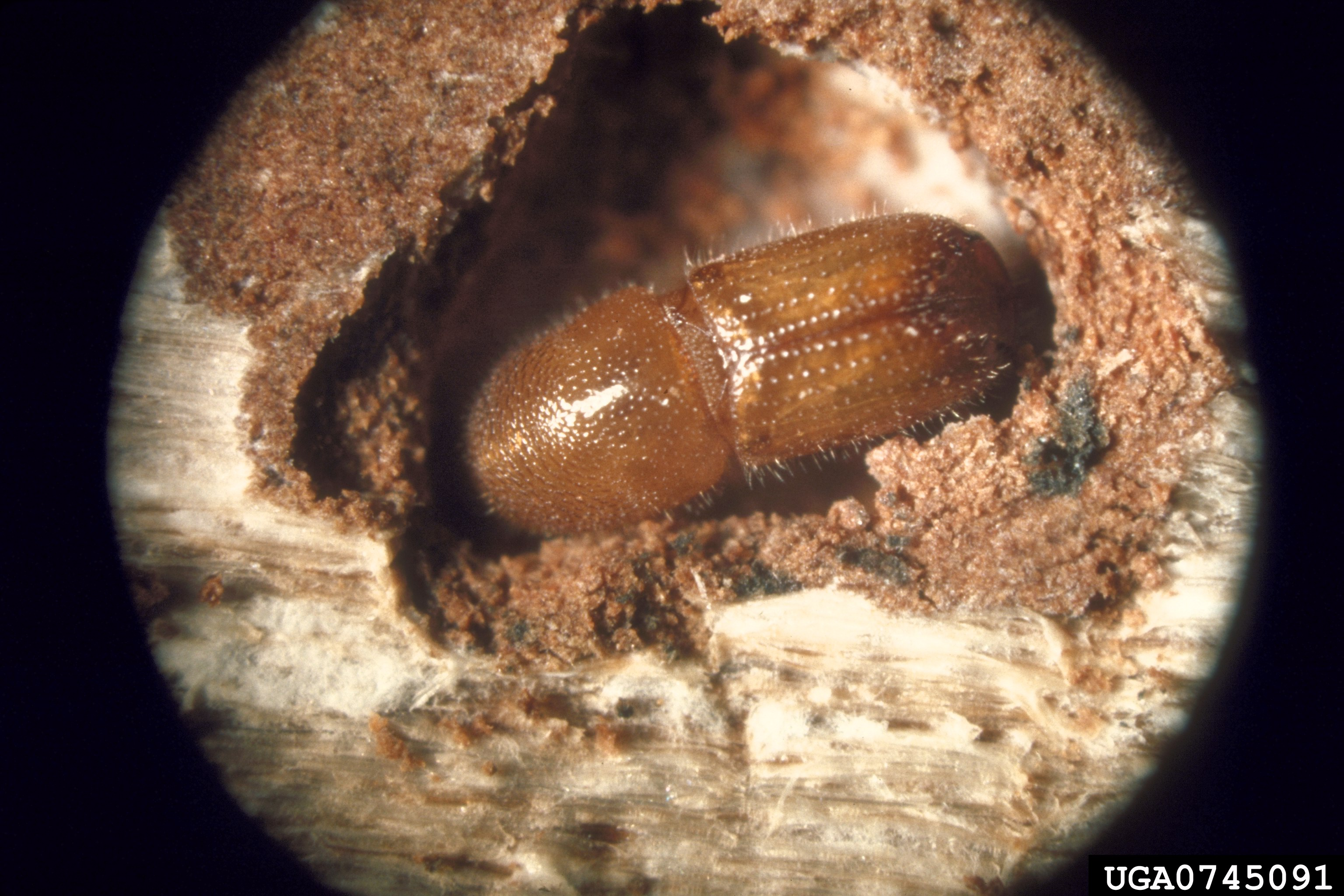

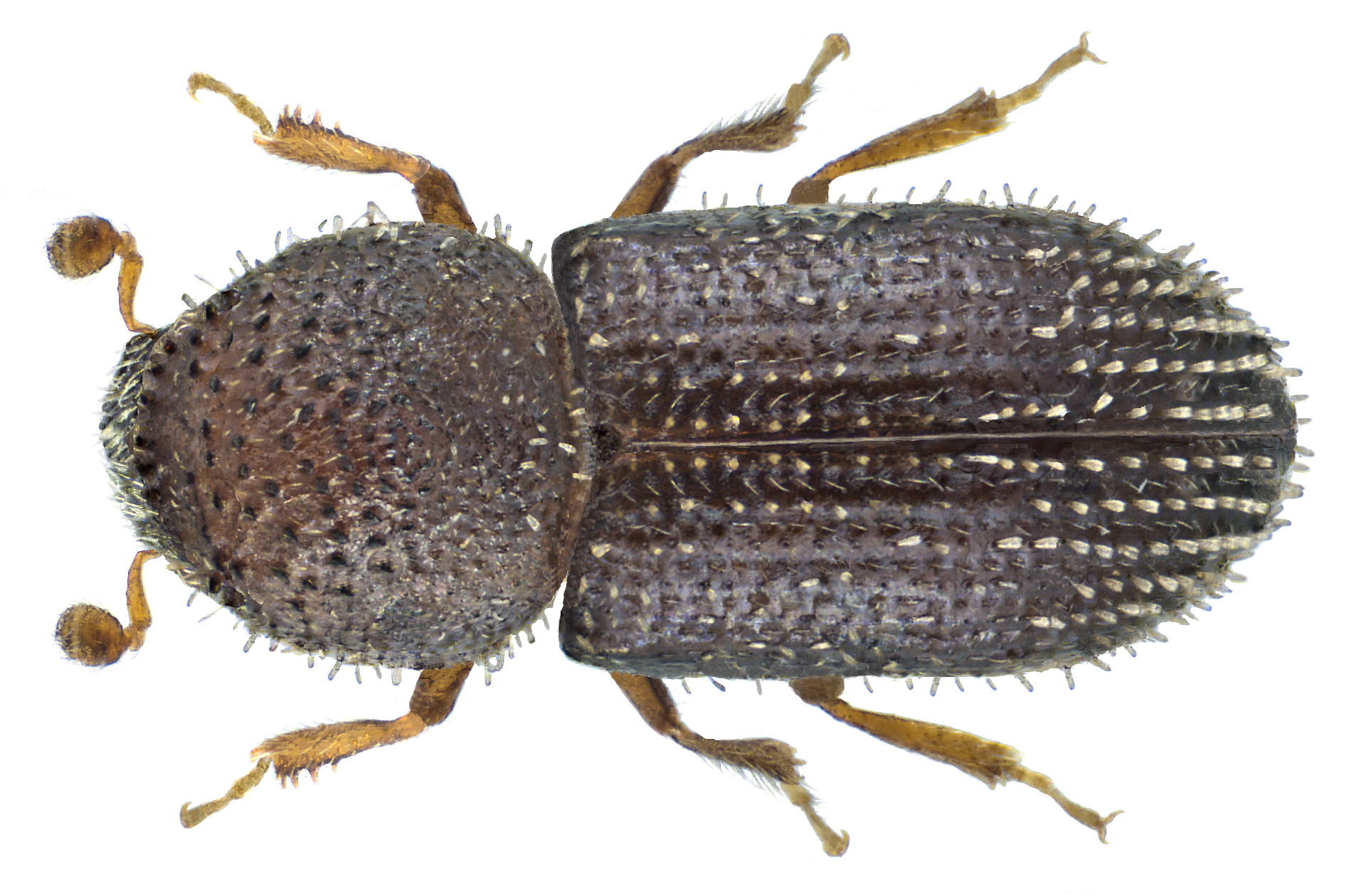
- Ips avulsus and Hypothenemus seriatus

Scientific classification
- Kingdom: Animalia
- Phylum: Arthropoda
- Class: Insecta
- Order: Coleoptera
- Suborder: Polyphaga
- Infraorder: Cucujiformia
- Family: Curculionidae
- Subfamily: Scolytinae
- Tribe: Scolytini; Latreille, 1804

= Scolytini =

Tribe of beetles

Scolytini is a tribe of typical bark beetles in the family Curculionidae. There are at least 50 genera and 160 described species in Scolytini.

== Genera ==
- Ambrosiodmus Hopkins, 1915
- Ambrosiophilus
- Anisandrus
- Cactopinus Schwarz, 1899
- Cnemonyx Eichhoff, 1868
- Cnestus
- Coccotrypes Eichhoff, 1878 (palm seed borers)
- Conophthorus Hopkins, 1915
- Coptoborus
- Corthylus Erichson, 1836
- Cryphalus Erichson, 1836
- Cryptocarenus Eggers, 1937
- Crypturgus Erichson, 1836
- Cyclorhipidion
- Dactylotrypes
- Dendrocranulus Schedl, 1937
- Dendroterus Blandford, 1904
- Dolurgus Eichhoff, 1868
- Dryocoetes Eichhoff, 1864
- Dryocoetoides
- Dryoxylon
- Euwallacea
- Gnathotrichus Eichhoff, 1869
- Hylocurus Eichhoff, 1872
- Hypocryphalus Hopkins, 1915
- Hypothenemus Westwood, 1836 (oriental bark beetles)
- Ips De Geer, 1775
- Lymantor Lovendal, 1889
- Micracis LeConte, 1868
- Micracisella Blackman, 1928
- Monarthrum Kirsch, 1866
- Orthotomicus Ferrari, 1867
- Pityoborus Blackman, 1922
- Pityogenes Bedel, 1888
- Pityokteines Fuchs, 1911
- Pityophthorus Eichhoff, 1864
- Pityotrichus Wood, 1962
- Premnobius Eichhoff, 1878
- Procryphalus Hopkins, 1915
- Pseudips
- Pseudopityophthorus Swaine, 1918
- Pseudothysanoes Blackman, 1920
- Pycnarthrum Eichhoff, 1878
- Scolytodes Ferrari, 1867
- Scolytogenes Eichhoff, 1878
- Scolytus Geoffroy, 1762
- Stenoclyptus
- Theoborus
- Thysanoes LeConte, 1876
- Trischidias Hopkins, 1915
- Trypodendron Stephens, 1830
- Trypophloeus Fairmaire, 1868
- Wallacellus
- Xyleborinus Reitter, 1913
- Xyleborus Eichhoff, 1864
- Xylosandrus Reitter, 1913
- Xyloterinus Swaine, 1918
