= List of Pityophthorus species =

This is a list of 545 species in Pityophthorus, a genus of typical bark beetles in the family Curculionidae.

== Pityophthorus species ==
- Pityophthorus abbreviatus Schedl, 1972g^{c}
- Pityophthorus abiegnus Wood, 1964^{c}
- Pityophthorus abietinus Wood, 1989^{c}
- Pityophthorus abietis Blackman, 1928b^{c}
- Pityophthorus ablusus Bright, 1985b^{c}
- Pityophthorus abnormalis Bright, 1972d^{c}
- Pityophthorus absonus Blackman, 1928^{i c}
- Pityophthorus abstrusus Bright, 1976c^{c}
- Pityophthorus acceptus Bright, 1981d^{c}
- Pityophthorus acerini Blackman, 1928b^{c}
- Pityophthorus aciculatus Bright, 1977^{c}
- Pityophthorus acuminatus Bright, 1981d^{c}
- Pityophthorus acutus Blackman, 1928^{i c}
- Pityophthorus africanulus Wood, 1992a^{c}
- Pityophthorus africanus Eggers, 1927a^{c}
- Pityophthorus agnatus Blackman, 1928b^{c}
- Pityophthorus albertensis Blackman, 1928b^{c}
- Pityophthorus alienus Eichhoff, 1872a^{c}
- Pityophthorus alni Blackman, 1942a^{c}
- Pityophthorus alnicolens Wood, 1977b^{c}
- Pityophthorus alpinensis Hopping, 1960^{i c}
- Pityophthorus alvarengai Schedl, 1972g^{c}
- Pityophthorus amiculus Wood, 1975b^{c}
- Pityophthorus amoenus Blandford, 1904^{c}
- Pityophthorus amplus (Blackman, 1928)^{i c}
- Pityophthorus anacardii Wood, 2007^{c}
- Pityophthorus anceps Blackman, 1928b^{c}
- Pityophthorus angeri Pfeffer, 1927^{c}
- Pityophthorus angustus Blackman, 1928b^{c}
- Pityophthorus annectens LeConte, 1878^{i c b}
- Pityophthorus anthracinus Bright, 1976c^{c}
- Pityophthorus anticus Schedl, 1976a^{c}
- Pityophthorus antillicus Bright, 1981c^{c}
- Pityophthorus antiquarius Bright & Poinar, 1994^{c}
- Pityophthorus apachae Bright, 1977^{c}
- Pityophthorus apache Bright, 1977^{i g}
- Pityophthorus aphelofacies Bright & Poinar, 1994^{c}
- Pityophthorus apicenotatus Schedl, 1976a^{c}
- Pityophthorus apicipennis Schedl, 1976a^{c}
- Pityophthorus apiculatus Schedl, 1937h^{c}
- Pityophthorus aplanatus Schedl, 1930^{c}
- Pityophthorus aquilonius Bright, 1968c^{c}
- Pityophthorus aquilus Blackman, 1928^{i c}
- Pityophthorus arakii Bright, 1977^{c}
- Pityophthorus arcanus Bright, 1976^{i c}
- Pityophthorus arceuthobii Wood, 1971^{c}
- Pityophthorus argentinensis Eggers, 1951^{c}
- Pityophthorus argentiniae Wood & Bright, 1992^{c}
- Pityophthorus aristatae Bright, 1964^{c}
- Pityophthorus artifex Blackman, 1928b^{c}
- Pityophthorus ascendens Schedl, 1972g^{c}
- Pityophthorus ashanti Schedl, 1972e^{c}
- Pityophthorus assitus Wood, 1977b^{c}
- Pityophthorus aterrimus Eggers, 1931b^{c}
- Pityophthorus atkinsoni Bright, 1985a^{c}
- Pityophthorus atomus Wood, 1964^{c}
- Pityophthorus atratulus LeConte, 1868^{c}
- Pityophthorus attenuatus Blackman, 1942a^{c}
- Pityophthorus auctor Blackman, 1942a^{c}
- Pityophthorus aurulentus Bright, 1966b^{c}
- Pityophthorus australis Blackman, 1928b^{c}
- Pityophthorus aztecus Bright, 1977^{c}
- Pityophthorus bahiae Wood, 2007^{c}
- Pityophthorus balcanicus Pfeffer, 1940b^{c}
- Pityophthorus balsameus Blackman, 1922^{i c}
- Pityophthorus barberi Blackman, 1928^{i c}
- Pityophthorus barbifer Schedl, 1964j^{c}
- Pityophthorus barbosai Wood, 2007^{c}
- Pityophthorus bassetti Blackman, 1920^{i c}
- Pityophthorus bellus Blackman, 1928b^{c}
- Pityophthorus bibractensis Balachowsky, 1949a^{c}
- Pityophthorus biovalis Blackman, 1922^{i c}
- Pityophthorus bisulcatus Eichhoff, 1869a^{c}
- Pityophthorus blackmani Wood, 1986a^{c}
- Pityophthorus blandulus Schedl, 1955g^{c}
- Pityophthorus blandus Blackman, 1928^{i c}
- Pityophthorus bolivianus Eggers, 1943a^{c}
- Pityophthorus borrhichiae Wood, 1964^{i}
- Pityophthorus borrichiae Wood, 1964^{c}
- Pityophthorus boycei Swaine, 1925^{i c}
- Pityophthorus brasiliensis Wood & Bright, 1992^{c}
- Pityophthorus bravoi Bright, 1986b^{c}
- Pityophthorus brevicomatus Bright, 1976c^{c}
- Pityophthorus brevis Blackman, 1928^{i c}
- Pityophthorus brevisetosus Eggers, 1933b^{c}
- Pityophthorus brighti Wood, 1989^{c}
- Pityophthorus briscoei Blackman, 1922^{i c}
- Pityophthorus brucki Bright, 1971b^{c}
- Pityophthorus burkei Blackman, 1928b^{c}
- Pityophthorus burserae Wood, 1976a^{c}
- Pityophthorus busseae Schedl, 1962h^{c}
- Pityophthorus buyssoni Reitter, 1901a^{c}
- Pityophthorus cacuminatus Blandford, 1904^{c}
- Pityophthorus caelator Blackman, 1928b^{c}
- Pityophthorus californicus Bright, 1976^{i c}
- Pityophthorus camerunus Eggers, 1920^{c}
- Pityophthorus canadensis Swaine, J.M., 1917^{c}
- Pityophthorus carinatus Bright, 1978^{i c}
- Pityophthorus cariniceps LeConte, 1876^{i c}
- Pityophthorus carinifrons Blandford, 1904^{c}
- Pityophthorus carinulatus Swaine, 1925^{i c}
- Pityophthorus carmeli Swaine, 1918^{i c}
- Pityophthorus carniolicus Wichmann, H.E., 1910a^{c}
- Pityophthorus cascoensis Blackman, 1928^{i c}
- Pityophthorus catulus Blackman, 1928b^{c}
- Pityophthorus cavatus Bright, 1978^{i c}
- Pityophthorus cedri Wood, 1989^{c}
- Pityophthorus celatus Wood & Bright, 1992^{c}
- Pityophthorus cephalonicae Pfeffer, 1940b^{c}
- Pityophthorus chalcoensis Hopkins, 1905b^{c}
- Pityophthorus chiapensis Bright, 1977^{c}
- Pityophthorus chilgoza Wood, 1989^{c}
- Pityophthorus chir Beeson, 1961^{c}
- Pityophthorus ciliatus Blackman, 1942a^{c}
- Pityophthorus cincinnatus Blandford, 1904^{c}
- Pityophthorus citus Blackman, 1928b^{c}
- Pityophthorus clarus Blackman, 1928^{i c}
- Pityophthorus clivus Bright, 1977^{c}
- Pityophthorus cognatus Blackman, 1928b^{c}
- Pityophthorus collaris Schedl, 1965c^{c}
- Pityophthorus collinus Bright, 1968c^{c}
- Pityophthorus comosus Blackman, 1928^{i c}
- Pityophthorus comptus Blackman, 1928b^{c}
- Pityophthorus concavus Blackman, 1928^{i c}
- Pityophthorus concentralis Eichhoff, 1878^{i c}
- Pityophthorus concinnus Wood, 1977b^{c}
- Pityophthorus confertus Swaine, 1917^{i c}
- Pityophthorus confinis LeConte, 1876^{i c}
- Pityophthorus confractus Bright, 1985c^{c}
- Pityophthorus confusus Blandford, 1904^{i c}
- Pityophthorus congonus Eggers, 1927a^{c}
- Pityophthorus coniferae Stebbing, E.P., 1909b^{c}
- Pityophthorus coniperda Schwarz, E.A., 1895a^{c}
- Pityophthorus conscriptus Bright, 1986b^{c}
- Pityophthorus consimilis LeConte, 1878^{i c b}
- Pityophthorus conspectus Wood, 1976a^{c}
- Pityophthorus convexicollis Bright & Torres, 2006^{c}
- Pityophthorus coronarius Blackman, 1942a^{c}
- Pityophthorus corruptus Wood, 1976a^{c}
- Pityophthorus cortezi Bright, 1977^{c}
- Pityophthorus corticalis Eichhoff, 1872a^{c}
- Pityophthorus costabilis Wood, 1976a^{c}
- Pityophthorus costalimai Blackman, 1942a^{c}
- Pityophthorus costatulus Wood, 1976a^{c}
- Pityophthorus costatus Wood, 1975b^{c}
- Pityophthorus costifera Bright, 1985b^{c}
- Pityophthorus cracentis Bright, 1985b^{c}
- Pityophthorus crassus Blackman, 1928^{i c}
- Pityophthorus cribratus Pfeffer, 1940b^{c}
- Pityophthorus cribripennis Eichhoff, 1869a^{c}
- Pityophthorus crinalis Blackman, 1928^{i c}
- Pityophthorus cristatus Wood, 1964^{i c}
- Pityophthorus crotonis Wood, 1977d^{c}
- Pityophthorus cubensis Schedl, 1972g^{c}
- Pityophthorus culminicolae Bright, 1977^{c}
- Pityophthorus curtulus Sokanovskii, B.V., 1954^{c}
- Pityophthorus cuspidatus Blackman, 1942a^{c}
- Pityophthorus cutleri Swaine, J.M., 1925b^{c}
- Pityophthorus debilis Wood, 1976a^{c}
- Pityophthorus declivisetosus Bright, 1977^{c}
- Pityophthorus degener Wood, 1975b^{c}
- Pityophthorus deleoni Bright, 1976c^{c}
- Pityophthorus deletus LeConte, 1879^{i c}
- Pityophthorus delicatus Wood, 1978b^{c}
- Pityophthorus demissus Blackman, 1928b^{c}
- Pityophthorus denticulatus Wood & Bright, 1992^{c}
- Pityophthorus dentifrons Blackman, 1922^{i c}
- Pityophthorus deodara Wood & Bright, 1992^{c}
- Pityophthorus deprecator Schaufuss, C.F.C., 1891^{c}
- Pityophthorus depygis Blackman, 1928^{i c}
- Pityophthorus desultorius Bright, 1985b^{c}
- Pityophthorus detectus Schedl, 1972g^{c}
- Pityophthorus detentus Wood, 1976a^{c}
- Pityophthorus deyrollei Blandford, 1904^{c}
- Pityophthorus digestus (LeConte, 1874)^{i c}
- Pityophthorus diglyphus Blandford, 1904^{c}
- Pityophthorus diligens Wood, 1976a^{c}
- Pityophthorus dimidiatus Blackman, 1942a^{c}
- Pityophthorus diminutivus Bright, 1985a^{c}
- Pityophthorus dimorphus Schedl, 1959m^{c}
- Pityophthorus discretus Wood, 1977c^{c}
- Pityophthorus dispar Bright, 1976c^{c}
- Pityophthorus dissolutus Wood, 1975b^{c}
- Pityophthorus diversus Bright, 1972d^{c}
- Pityophthorus djuguensis Eggers, 1940b^{c}
- Pityophthorus dolus Wood, 1964^{c}
- Pityophthorus dorsalis Schedl, 1953d^{c}
- Pityophthorus durus Blackman, 1928^{i c}
- Pityophthorus edulis Blackman, 1928b^{c}
- Pityophthorus eggersi Schedl, 1952d^{c}
- Pityophthorus eggersianus Schedl, 1958k^{c}
- Pityophthorus elatinus Wood, 1964^{c}
- Pityophthorus electus Blackman, 1928^{i c}
- Pityophthorus elegans Schedl, 1938a^{c}
- Pityophthorus elimatus Bright, 1976c^{c}
- Pityophthorus elongatulus Schedl, 1976a^{c}
- Pityophthorus elongatus Swaine, J.M., 1925b^{c}
- Pityophthorus epistomalis Schedl, 1961i^{c}
- Pityophthorus equihuai Bright, 1985a^{c}
- Pityophthorus erraticus Schedl, 1976a^{c}
- Pityophthorus espinosai Brèthes, 1925^{c}
- Pityophthorus eucracens Wood, 2007^{c}
- Pityophthorus euterpes Bright, 1978^{c}
- Pityophthorus excellens Schedl, 1972g^{c}
- Pityophthorus exiguus Blackman, 1928b^{c}
- Pityophthorus exilis Swaine, J.M., 1925b^{c}
- Pityophthorus eximius Schedl, 1938a^{c}
- Pityophthorus explicitus Wood, 1975b^{c}
- Pityophthorus exquisitus Bright, 1981d^{c}
- Pityophthorus exsculptus Eichhoff, 1864b^{c}
- Pityophthorus exsectus Schedl, 1972g^{c}
- Pityophthorus fallax Wood & Bright, 1992^{c}
- Pityophthorus fennicus Eggers, 1914^{c}
- Pityophthorus festus Wood, 1967^{i c}
- Pityophthorus flavimaculatus Murayama, 1963c^{c}
- Pityophthorus foratus Wood, 1967d^{c}
- Pityophthorus formosus Bright, 1972d^{c}
- Pityophthorus fortis Blackman, 1928b^{c}
- Pityophthorus fossifrons Leconte, 1876^{c}
- Pityophthorus franseriae Wood, 1971^{i c}
- Pityophthorus frontalis Wood & Bright, 1992^{c}
- Pityophthorus fulgens Schedl, 1965c^{c}
- Pityophthorus furnissi Bright, 1976c^{c}
- Pityophthorus fuscus Blackman, 1928^{i c}
- Pityophthorus galeritus Wood, 1976a^{c}
- Pityophthorus gentilis Schedl, 1961i^{c}
- Pityophthorus germanus Bright, 1976c^{c}
- Pityophthorus ghanaensis Schedl, 1972k^{c}
- Pityophthorus glaber Schedl (Eggers in), 1951m^{c}
- Pityophthorus glabratulus Bright, 1976b^{c}
- Pityophthorus glabratus Eichhoff, 1878b^{c}
- Pityophthorus glutae Wood, 1989^{c}
- Pityophthorus gracilis Swaine, J.M., 1925b^{c}
- Pityophthorus grandis Blackman, 1928^{i c}
- Pityophthorus granulatus Swaine, J.M., 1917^{c}
- Pityophthorus granulicauda Schedl, 1979c^{c}
- Pityophthorus granulipennis Schedl, 1966f^{c}
- Pityophthorus guadeloupensis Nunberg, 1956d^{c}
- Pityophthorus guatemalensis Blandford, 1904^{c}
- Pityophthorus gunneri Schedl, 1970f^{c}
- Pityophthorus hamamelidis Blackman, 1928b^{c}
- Pityophthorus henscheli Seitner, M., 1887^{c}
- Pityophthorus hermosus Wood, 1976a^{c}
- Pityophthorus herrarai Hopkins, 1905b^{c}
- Pityophthorus hesperius Bright, 1978^{c}
- Pityophthorus hidalgoensis Blackman, 1942a^{c}
- Pityophthorus hintzi Schedl, 1938h^{c}
- Pityophthorus hirticeps LeConte, 1878b^{c}
- Pityophthorus hispaniolus Bright, 1985c^{c}
- Pityophthorus hopkinsi Blackman, 1928b^{c}
- Pityophthorus hubbardi Blackman, 1928b^{c}
- Pityophthorus hylocuroides Wood, 1964^{c}
- Pityophthorus icicae Wood, 2007^{c}
- Pityophthorus idoneus Blackman, 1928b^{c}
- Pityophthorus ignotus Schedl, 1961e^{c}
- Pityophthorus ikelaensis Nunberg, 1967b^{c}
- Pityophthorus imbellis Wood, 2007^{c}
- Pityophthorus immanis Blackman, 1928^{i c}
- Pityophthorus impexus Bright, 1978^{c}
- Pityophthorus inaequidens Schedl, 1976a^{c}
- Pityophthorus inceptis Wood, 1975b^{c}
- Pityophthorus incommodus Blandford, 1904^{c}
- Pityophthorus incompositus Blandford, 1904^{c}
- Pityophthorus indefessus Bright, 1986a^{c}
- Pityophthorus indigens Wood, 1976a^{c}
- Pityophthorus indigus Wood, 1978^{i c}
- Pityophthorus ineditus Bright, 1976c^{c}
- Pityophthorus infans Eichhoff, 1872a^{c}
- Pityophthorus infimus Schedl, 1972g^{c}
- Pityophthorus infulatus Blackman, 1928^{i c}
- Pityophthorus ingens Blackman, 1928^{i c}
- Pityophthorus inhabilis Bright, 1986a^{c}
- Pityophthorus iniquus Blackman, 1928b^{c}
- Pityophthorus inops Wood, 1976a^{c}
- Pityophthorus inquietus Blackman, 1928b^{c}
- Pityophthorus insuetus Bright, 1985b^{c}
- Pityophthorus intentus Bright, 1978^{i c}
- Pityophthorus intextus Swaine, 1917^{i c}
- Pityophthorus inyoensis Bright, 1971b^{c}
- Pityophthorus irregularis Eggers, 1931b^{c}
- Pityophthorus irritans Schedl, 1979j^{c}
- Pityophthorus islasi Wood, 1962^{c}
- Pityophthorus ituriensis Eggers, 1940b^{c}
- Pityophthorus jeffreyi Blackman, 1928^{i c}
- Pityophthorus joveri Schedl, 1954d^{c}
- Pityophthorus jucundus Blandford, 1894d^{c}
- Pityophthorus juglandis Blackman, 1928^{i c b} (walnut twig beetle)
- Pityophthorus keeni (Blackman, 1928)^{i}
- Pityophthorus kenti Blackman, 1928b^{c}
- Pityophthorus kenyae Schedl, 1955i^{c}
- Pityophthorus kirgisicus Pjatnitskii, 1931^{c}
- Pityophthorus kivuensis Schedl, 1957d^{c}
- Pityophthorus knoteki Reitter, 1898b^{c}
- Pityophthorus kurentzovi Krivolutskaya, 1996a^{c}
- Pityophthorus kuscheli Schedl, 1951d^{c}
- Pityophthorus laetus Wood, 1976a^{c}
- Pityophthorus laevigatus Eggers, 1933b^{c}
- Pityophthorus languidus Eichhoff, 1878b^{c}
- Pityophthorus lapponicus Stark, V.N., 1952^{c}
- Pityophthorus lateralis Swaine, J.M., 1917^{c}
- Pityophthorus laticeps Bright, 1978^{c}
- Pityophthorus lautus Eichhoff, 1872^{i c}
- Pityophthorus lecontei Bright, 1977^{i c}
- Pityophthorus leechi Wood, 1977^{i c}
- Pityophthorus leiophyllae Blackman, 1942a^{c}
- Pityophthorus lenis Wood, 1976a^{c}
- Pityophthorus lepidus Bright, 1977^{c}
- Pityophthorus levis Wood, 1986^{i c}
- Pityophthorus lichtensteini Eichhoff, 1864b^{c}
- Pityophthorus limatus Wood, 1964^{c}
- Pityophthorus liquidambarus Blackman, 1921^{i c}
- Pityophthorus litos Bright, 1976c^{c}
- Pityophthorus longipilus Schedl, 1951m^{c}
- Pityophthorus longulus Sokanovskii, B.V., 1954^{c}
- Pityophthorus macrographus Eichhoff, 1880a^{c}
- Pityophthorus madagascariensis Schedl, 1951j^{c}
- Pityophthorus malleatus Bright, 1978^{c}
- Pityophthorus mandibularis Schedl, 1951m^{c}
- Pityophthorus maritimus Stark, V.N., 1952^{c}
- Pityophthorus maroantsetrae Schedl, 1965c^{c}
- Pityophthorus mauretanicus Peyerimhoff, 1930^{c}
- Pityophthorus medialis Wood, 1976a^{c}
- Pityophthorus megas Bright, 1976c^{c}
- Pityophthorus melanurus Wood, 1976a^{c}
- Pityophthorus mendosus Wood, 1975b^{c}
- Pityophthorus mesembria Bright, 1978^{c}
- Pityophthorus mexicanus Blackman, 1928b^{c}
- Pityophthorus micans Bright, 1981d^{c}
- Pityophthorus micrographus (Linnaeus, C., 1758)^{c g}
- Pityophthorus micrograptinus Wood, 1989^{c}
- Pityophthorus miniatus Bright, 1981d^{c}
- Pityophthorus minimus Bright, 1976^{i c g}
- Pityophthorus minus Bright, 1976c^{c}
- Pityophthorus minutalis Wood, 1976a^{c}
- Pityophthorus minutus Schedl, 1963d^{c}
- Pityophthorus modicus Blackman, 1928^{i c}
- Pityophthorus molestus Wood, 1976a^{c}
- Pityophthorus mollis Blackman, 1928b^{c}
- Pityophthorus monophyllae Blackman, 1928b^{c}
- Pityophthorus montezumae Bright, 1978^{c}
- Pityophthorus monticolae Bright, 1978^{c}
- Pityophthorus montivagus Bright, 1977^{c}
- Pityophthorus moritzi Wood, 2007^{c}
- Pityophthorus mormon Bright, 1977^{i c}
- Pityophthorus morosovi Spessivtsev, P., 1926b^{c}
- Pityophthorus morosus Wood, 1976a^{c}
- Pityophthorus mpossae Schedl, 1957d^{c}
- Pityophthorus muluensis Bright, 2000^{c}
- Pityophthorus mulungensis Schedl, 1957d^{c}
- Pityophthorus mundus Blackman, 1928b^{c}
- Pityophthorus murrayanae Blackman, 1922^{i c}
- Pityophthorus nanus Wood, 1964^{c}
- Pityophthorus natalis Blackman, 1921^{c}
- Pityophthorus navus Blackman, 1928b^{c}
- Pityophthorus nebulosus Wood, 1976a^{c}
- Pityophthorus nectandrae Wood, 2007^{c}
- Pityophthorus nemoralis Wood, 1976a^{c}
- Pityophthorus niger Schedl, 1938a^{c}
- Pityophthorus nigricans Blandford, 1904^{c}
- Pityophthorus nigriceps Wood, 2007^{c}
- Pityophthorus nitellus Browne, 1973a^{c}
- Pityophthorus nitidicollis Blackman, 1928b^{c}
- Pityophthorus nitidulus (Mannerheim, 1843)^{i}
- Pityophthorus nitidus Swaine, 1917^{i c}
- Pityophthorus nocturnus Schedl, 1938a^{c}
- Pityophthorus novateutonicus Schedl, 1964b^{c}
- Pityophthorus novellus Blackman, 1928^{i c}
- Pityophthorus nudus Swaine, J.M., 1917^{c}
- Pityophthorus nugalis Wood, 1976a^{c}
- Pityophthorus obliquus LeConte, 1878a^{c}
- Pityophthorus obsoletus Blandford, 1904^{c}
- Pityophthorus obtusipennis Blandford, 1904^{c}
- Pityophthorus obtusus Schaufuss, C.F.C., 1891^{c}
- Pityophthorus occidentalis Blackman, 1920^{i c}
- Pityophthorus occlusus Bright, 1976c^{c}
- Pityophthorus olivierai Schedl, 1972g^{c}
- Pityophthorus opacifrons Wood, 2007^{c}
- Pityophthorus opaculus LeConte, 1878^{i c}
- Pityophthorus opimus Blackman, 1928b^{c}
- Pityophthorus orarius Bright, 1968^{i c}
- Pityophthorus ornatus Blackman, 1928b^{c}
- Pityophthorus ostryacolens Bright, 1986b^{c}
- Pityophthorus pampasae Schedl, 1970e^{c}
- Pityophthorus parfentievi Pjatnitskii, 1931^{c}
- Pityophthorus parilis Wood, 1976a^{c}
- Pityophthorus patchi Blackman, 1922c^{c}
- Pityophthorus paulus Wood, 1964^{c}
- Pityophthorus pecki Atkinson, 1993b^{c}
- Pityophthorus pellitus Schedl, 1955g^{c}
- Pityophthorus pentaclethrae Schedl, 1957d^{c}
- Pityophthorus peregrinus Eichhoff, 1878b^{c}
- Pityophthorus perexiguus Wood, 1976a^{c}
- Pityophthorus perotei Blackman, 1942a^{c}
- Pityophthorus philippinensis Schedl, 1936h^{c}
- Pityophthorus piceae Blackman, 1928b^{c}
- Pityophthorus piceus Bright, 1966b^{c}
- Pityophthorus pilifer Schedl, 1931b^{c}
- Pityophthorus pinavorus Bright, 1985^{i c}
- Pityophthorus pindrow Beeson, 1961^{c}
- Pityophthorus pinguus (Blackman, 1928)^{i g}
- Pityophthorus pini Kurenzov, 1941a^{c}
- Pityophthorus pinsapo Pfeffer, 1982b^{c}
- Pityophthorus podocarpi Wood, 2007^{c}
- Pityophthorus politus Blandford, 1904^{c}
- Pityophthorus polonicus Karpinski, 1949^{c}
- Pityophthorus ponderosae Blackman, 1928b^{c}
- Pityophthorus poricollis Blandford, 1904^{c}
- Pityophthorus praealtus Bright, 1966b^{c}
- Pityophthorus pruinosus Eichhoff, 1878b^{c}
- Pityophthorus pseudotsugae Swaine, 1918^{i g}
- Pityophthorus puberulus (LeConte, 1868)^{i}
- Pityophthorus pubifrons Bright, 1981d^{c}
- Pityophthorus pudicus Blackman, 1942a^{c}
- Pityophthorus pulchellus Eichhoff, 1869^{i c}
- Pityophthorus pulicarius (Zimmermann, 1868)^{i}
- Pityophthorus pullus (Zimmermann, 1868)^{i}
- Pityophthorus punctatus Eggers, 1940a^{c}
- Pityophthorus puncticollis LeConte, 1874a^{c}
- Pityophthorus punctifrons Bright, 1966^{i c}
- Pityophthorus punctiger Wood & Bright, 1992^{c}
- Pityophthorus pusillus Wood, 1964^{c}
- Pityophthorus pusio LeConte, 1878b^{c}
- Pityophthorus pygmaeolus Schedl, 1970e^{c}
- Pityophthorus pygmaeus Schedl, 1931b^{c}
- Pityophthorus quadrispinatus Schedl, 1966f^{c}
- Pityophthorus quercinus Wood, 1967d^{c}
- Pityophthorus querciperda Schwarz, E.A., 1888a^{c}
- Pityophthorus ramiperda Swaine, 1917^{i c}
- Pityophthorus ramulorum Perris, 1856a^{c}
- Pityophthorus recens Bright, 1977^{i g}
- Pityophthorus regularis Blackman, 1942a^{c}
- Pityophthorus repens Bright, 1976c^{c}
- Pityophthorus reticulatus Wood, 2007^{c}
- Pityophthorus retifrons Wood, 2007^{c}
- Pityophthorus rhois Swaine, J.M., 1917^{c}
- Pityophthorus robai Wood, 1977b^{c}
- Pityophthorus robustus Pfeffer, 1940b^{c}
- Pityophthorus roppae Schedl, 1976a^{c}
- Pityophthorus rossicus Eggers, 1915b^{c}
- Pityophthorus rubidus Wood, 1978^{i c}
- Pityophthorus rubripes Eggers, 1943a^{c}
- Pityophthorus rudis Blackman, 1942a^{c}
- Pityophthorus rugicollis Swaine, J.M., 1925b^{c}
- Pityophthorus sachalinensis Krivolutskaya, 1956^{c}
- Pityophthorus sambuci Blackman, 1942a^{c}
- Pityophthorus sampsoni Stebbing, E.P., 1914^{c}
- Pityophthorus sapineus Bright, 1981d^{c}
- Pityophthorus scabridus Schedl, 1955g^{c}
- Pityophthorus scalptor Blackman, 1928^{i c}
- Pityophthorus scalptus Bright, 1978^{i c}
- Pityophthorus schrenkianae Pjatnitskii, 1931^{c}
- Pityophthorus schwarzi Blackman, 1928^{i c}
- Pityophthorus schwerdtfegeri Wood & Bright, 1992^{c}
- Pityophthorus schwerdtfergeri (Schedl, 1955)^{i g}
- Pityophthorus scitulus Wood, 1976a^{c}
- Pityophthorus scriptor Blackman, 1921^{i c}
- Pityophthorus segnis Blackman, 1928^{i c}
- Pityophthorus seiryuensis Murayama, 1963c^{c}
- Pityophthorus semiermis Nunberg, 1963c^{c}
- Pityophthorus senex Wichmann, H.E., 1913d^{c}
- Pityophthorus separatus Bright, 1977^{i c}
- Pityophthorus seriatus LeConte, 1878a^{c}
- Pityophthorus serratus Swaine, 1918^{i c}
- Pityophthorus setifer Browne, 1965a^{c}
- Pityophthorus setosus Blackman, 1928^{i c}
- Pityophthorus sextuberculatus Eggers, 1933b^{c}
- Pityophthorus shannoni Blackman, 1942a^{c}
- Pityophthorus shepardi Blackman, 1922c^{c}
- Pityophthorus sibiricus Nunberg, 1956d^{c}
- Pityophthorus sichotensis Kurenzov, 1941a^{c}
- Pityophthorus sierrensis Bright, 1971^{i c}
- Pityophthorus signatifrons Browne, 1975a^{c}
- Pityophthorus similaris Wood, 2007^{c}
- Pityophthorus similis Eichhoff, 1869a^{c}
- Pityophthorus simplicis Wood, 2007^{c}
- Pityophthorus singularis Bright, 1966b^{c}
- Pityophthorus sinopae Schedl, 1976a^{c}
- Pityophthorus siouxensis Bright, 1977^{c}
- Pityophthorus smithi Schedl, 1931b^{c}
- Pityophthorus sobrinus Wood, 1976a^{c}
- Pityophthorus socius Blackman, 1928b^{c}
- Pityophthorus solatus Wood, 1977b^{c}
- Pityophthorus solers Blackman, 1928^{i c}
- Pityophthorus solus Blackman, 1928^{i c}
- Pityophthorus spadix Blackman, 1942a^{c}
- Pityophthorus sparsepilosus Wood, 1975b^{c}
- Pityophthorus speciosus Wood, 1977b^{c}
- Pityophthorus speculum Bright, 1976c^{c}
- Pityophthorus splendens Wood, 2007^{c}
- Pityophthorus strictus Wood, 1976a^{c}
- Pityophthorus subconcentralis Schedl, 1938a^{c}
- Pityophthorus subcribratus Schedl, 1937h^{c}
- Pityophthorus subimpressus Bright, 1976c^{c}
- Pityophthorus subopacus Blackman, 1942a^{c}
- Pityophthorus subsimilans Wood, 1989^{c}
- Pityophthorus subsimilis Schedl, 1955g^{c}
- Pityophthorus subsulcatus Wood & Bright, 1992^{c}
- Pityophthorus sulcatus Bright, 1977^{i c}
- Pityophthorus surinamensis Schedl, 1961i^{c}
- Pityophthorus suspiciosus Bright, 1972d^{c}
- Pityophthorus suturalis Eggers, 1932d^{c}
- Pityophthorus swainei Blackman, 1928b^{c}
- Pityophthorus temporarius Bright & Poinar, 1994^{c}
- Pityophthorus tenax Wood, 1976a^{c}
- Pityophthorus tenuis Swaine, J.M., 1925b^{c}
- Pityophthorus terebrans Schedl, 1970i^{c}
- Pityophthorus thamnus Bright, 1985a^{c}
- Pityophthorus thatcheri Bright, 1976c^{c}
- Pityophthorus thomasi Bright, 1976c^{c}
- Pityophthorus timidulus Wood, 1975b^{c}
- Pityophthorus timidus Blandford, 1904^{c}
- Pityophthorus togonus Eggers, 1920^{c}
- Pityophthorus tomentosus Eichhoff, 1878b^{c}
- Pityophthorus tonsus Blackman, 1928b^{c}
- Pityophthorus toralis Wood, 1964^{i c}
- Pityophthorus torreyanae Swaine, J.M., 1918a^{c}
- Pityophthorus torridus Wood, 1971^{i c}
- Pityophthorus traeghardhi Spessivtseff, 1921^{g}
- Pityophthorus tragardhi Spessivtsev, P., 1921a^{c}
- Pityophthorus treculiae Schedl, 1962k^{c}
- Pityophthorus trepidus Bright, 1978^{i c}
- Pityophthorus trunculus Bright, 1985a^{c}
- Pityophthorus tuberculatus Eichhoff, 1878b^{c}
- Pityophthorus tucumanensis Wood, 2007^{c}
- Pityophthorus tumidus Blackman, 1928^{i c}
- Pityophthorus turbiculus Schedl, 1938a^{c}
- Pityophthorus tutulus Bright, 1986a^{c}
- Pityophthorus varians Schedl, 1930^{c}
- Pityophthorus vegrandis Bright, 1986a^{c}
- Pityophthorus venezuelensis Schedl, 1935d^{c}
- Pityophthorus venustus Blackman, 1928^{i c}
- Pityophthorus vesculus Wood, 1978b^{c}
- Pityophthorus vescus Wood, 2007^{c}
- Pityophthorus vespertinus Bright, 1978^{c}
- Pityophthorus viminalis Bright, 1977^{c}
- Pityophthorus virilis Blackman, 1928^{i c}
- Pityophthorus virtus Schedl, 1938a^{c}
- Pityophthorus volvulus Schedl, 1965f^{c}
- Pityophthorus vrydaghi Nunberg, 1973^{c}
- Pityophthorus watsoni Schedl, 1930^{c}
- Pityophthorus woodi Bright, 1977^{i c}
- Pityophthorus xylotrupes Eichhoff, 1872a^{c}
- Pityophthorus zeteki Blackman, 1942a^{c}
- Pityophthorus zexmenivora Bright, 1985a^{c}
- Pityophthorus zonalis Bright, 1976^{i c}

Data sources: i = ITIS, c = Catalogue of Life, g = GBIF, b = Bugguide.net
