= Pseudothysanoes turnbowi =

Scientific classification
- Kingdom: Animalia
- Phylum: Arthropoda
- Clade: Pancrustacea
- Class: Insecta
- Order: Coleoptera
- Suborder: Polyphaga
- Infraorder: Cucujiformia
- Family: Curculionidae
- Genus: Pseudothysanoes
- Species: P. turnbowi

Binomial name
- Pseudothysanoes turnbowi Wood, 1977

Species of beetle

Pseudothysanoes turnbowi is a species of typical bark beetle in the family Curculionidae. It is found in North America.
