= Conophthorus edulis =

Scientific classification
- Domain: Eukaryota
- Kingdom: Animalia
- Phylum: Arthropoda
- Class: Insecta
- Order: Coleoptera
- Suborder: Polyphaga
- Infraorder: Cucujiformia
- Family: Curculionidae
- Tribe: Scolytini
- Subtribe: Pityophthorina
- Genus: Conophthorus
- Species: C. edulis

Binomial name
- Conophthorus edulis Hopkins, 1915

Species of beetle

Conophthorus edulis, the pinon cone beetle, is a species of typical bark beetle in the family Curculionidae. It is found in North America.
