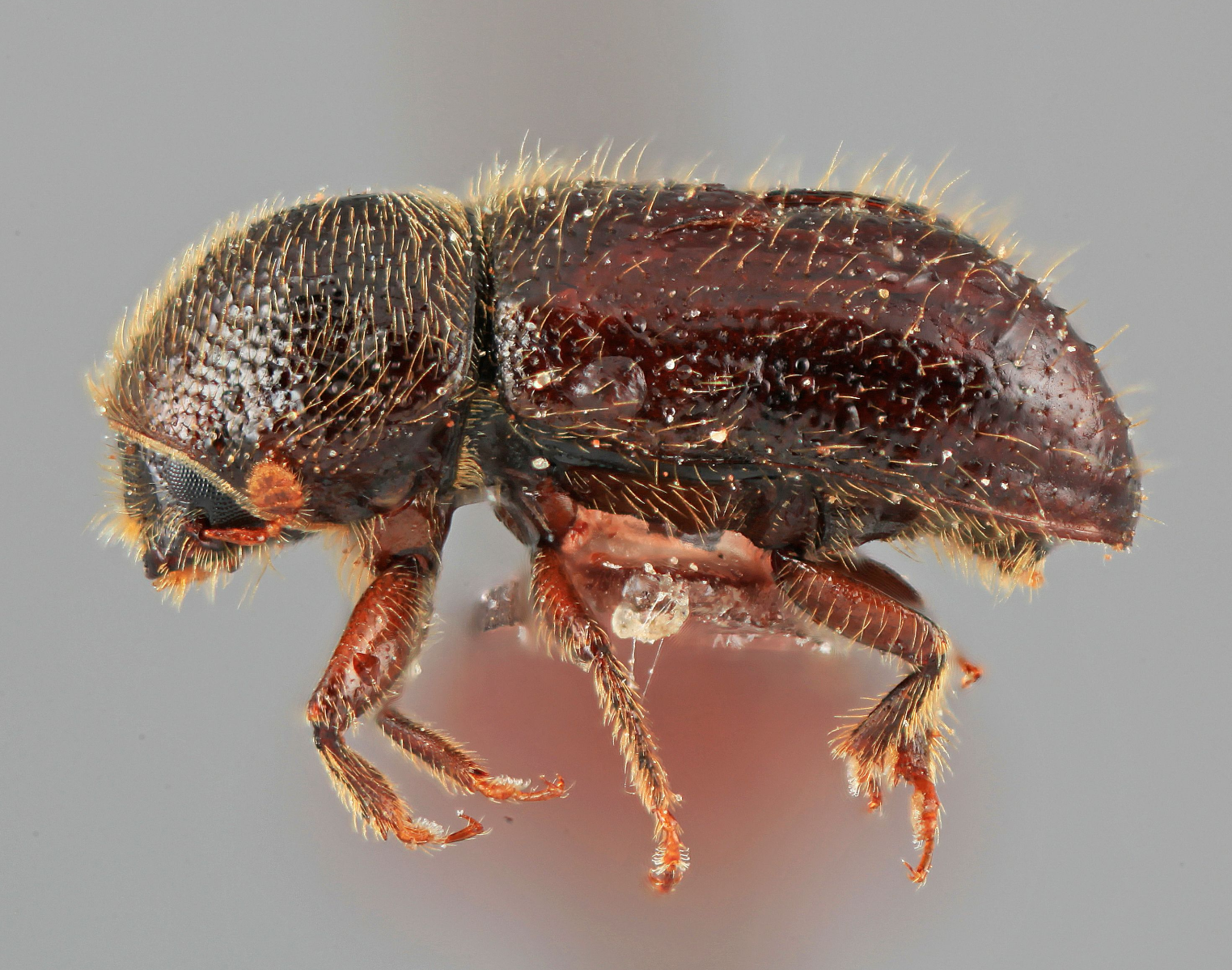
- Conophthorus teocotum, Mexico

Scientific classification
- Kingdom: Animalia
- Phylum: Arthropoda
- Clade: Pancrustacea
- Class: Insecta
- Order: Coleoptera
- Suborder: Polyphaga
- Infraorder: Cucujiformia
- Superfamily: Curculionoidea
- Family: Curculionidae
- Subfamily: Scolytinae
- Tribe: Scolytini
- Subtribe: Pityophthorina
- Genus: Conophthorus; Hopkins, 1915

= Conophthorus =

Genus of beetles

Conophthorus is a genus of "bark and ambrosia beetles" in the family Curculionidae. There are more than 20 described species in Conophthorus, found in Mexico, the United States, and Canada.

== Species ==
These 25 species belong to the genus Conophthorus:

- Conophthorus apachecae Hopkins, 1915
- Conophthorus banksianae McPherson, 1970 (jack pine tip beetle)
- Conophthorus cembroides Wood, 1972
- Conophthorus clunicus Hopkins, 1915
- Conophthorus conicolens Wood, 1977
- Conophthorus coniperda (Schwarz), 1895 (white pine cone beetle)
- Conophthorus contortae Hopkins, 1915
- Conophthorus delriomorai Rio Mora & Mayo (Wood in), 1988
- Conophthorus echinatae Wood, 1978
- Conophthorus edulis Hopkins, 1915 (pinon cone beetle)
- Conophthorus flexilis Hopkins, 1915
- Conophthorus lambertianae Hopkins, 1915 (sugar pine cone beetle)
- Conophthorus mexicanus Wood, 1962
- Conophthorus michoacanae Wood, 1980
- Conophthorus monophyllae Hopkins, 1915
- Conophthorus monticolae Hopkins, 1915
- Conophthorus ponderosae Hopkins, 1915 (lodgepole cone beetle)
- Conophthorus radiatae Hopkins, 1915 (Monterey pine cone beetle)
- Conophthorus resinosae Hopkins, 1915 (red pine cone beetle)
- Conophthorus schwerdtfegeri Schedl, 1955
- Conophthorus scopulorum Hopkins, 1915
- Conophthorus taedae Hopkins, 1915
- Conophthorus teocotum Wood, 1980
- Conophthorus terminalis Flores & Bright, 1987
- Conophthorus virginianae Hopkins, 1915
