= Micracisella opacithorax =

Scientific classification
- Kingdom: Animalia
- Phylum: Arthropoda
- Clade: Pancrustacea
- Class: Insecta
- Order: Coleoptera
- Suborder: Polyphaga
- Infraorder: Cucujiformia
- Family: Curculionidae
- Genus: Micracisella
- Species: M. opacithorax

Binomial name
- Micracisella opacithorax Wood & Bright, 1992

Species of beetle

Micracisella opacithorax is a species of typical bark beetle in the family Curculionidae. It is found in North America.
