= Cactopinus =

Scientific classification
- Kingdom: Animalia
- Phylum: Arthropoda
- Class: Insecta
- Order: Coleoptera
- Suborder: Polyphaga
- Infraorder: Cucujiformia
- Family: Curculionidae
- Tribe: Scolytini
- Genus: Cactopinus; Schwarz, 1899

Genus of beetles

Cactopinus is a genus of typical bark beetles in the family Curculionidae. There are more than 20 described species in Cactopinus.

== Species ==
These 22 species belong to the genus Cactopinus:

- Cactopinus agavensis Atkinson, 2010
- Cactopinus atkinsoni Wood, 1983a
- Cactopinus burjosi Wood, 1983a
- Cactopinus cactophthorus Wood, 1957d
- Cactopinus carinatus Wood, 1969a
- Cactopinus depressus Bright, 1967a
- Cactopinus desertus Bright, 1967
- Cactopinus granulatus Wood, 1983a
- Cactopinus granulifer Wood, 1969a
- Cactopinus hubbardi Schwarz, 1899
- Cactopinus koebelei Blackman, 1938
- Cactopinus mexicanus Wood, 1967d
- Cactopinus microcornis Wood, 1969a
- Cactopinus nasutus Wood, 1969a
- Cactopinus niger Wood, 1969a
- Cactopinus pini Blackman, 1938
- Cactopinus rhettbutleri Atkinson
- Cactopinus rhois Blackman, 1938
- Cactopinus setosus Wood, 1983a
- Cactopinus spinatus Wood, 1957d
- Cactopinus sulcifrons Atkinson, 2010
- Cactopinus woodi Atkinson, 2010
