= Micracisella =

Scientific classification
- Domain: Eukaryota
- Kingdom: Animalia
- Phylum: Arthropoda
- Class: Insecta
- Order: Coleoptera
- Suborder: Polyphaga
- Infraorder: Cucujiformia
- Family: Curculionidae
- Tribe: Scolytini
- Genus: Micracisella; Blackman, 1928

Genus of beetles

Micracisella is a genus of typical bark beetles in the family Curculionidae. There are at least 20 described species in Micracisella.

== Species ==
These 20 species belong to the genus Micracisella:

- Micracisella adnata Wood, 1971
- Micracisella divaricata Wood, 1969b
- Micracisella hondurensis Wood, 1956b
- Micracisella knulli Wood & Bright, 1992
- Micracisella mimetica Wood, 1974a
- Micracisella monadis Wood, 1969b
- Micracisella nanula Wood & Bright, 1992
- Micracisella nigra Wood, 1956b
- Micracisella nigrella Wood, 1969b
- Micracisella nitidula Wood, 1969b
- Micracisella ocellata Wood, 1974a
- Micracisella opacicollis Blackman, 1928a
- Micracisella opacithorax Schedl, 1940
- Micracisella scitula Wood, 1969b
- Micracisella serjaniae Wood, 1971
- Micracisella similis Wood, 1969b
- Micracisella squamatula Wood, 1969b
- Micracisella striata Wood, 1956b
- Micracisella subnitida Blackman, 1943
- Micracisella vescula Wood, 1969b
