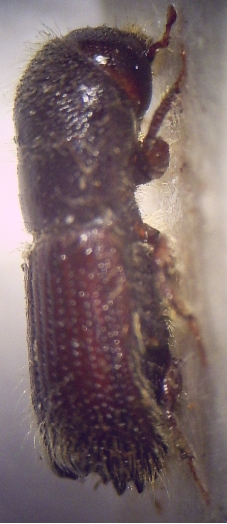

Scientific classification
- Domain: Eukaryota
- Kingdom: Animalia
- Phylum: Arthropoda
- Class: Insecta
- Order: Coleoptera
- Suborder: Polyphaga
- Infraorder: Cucujiformia
- Family: Curculionidae
- Subfamily: Scolytinae
- Tribe: Scolytini
- Genus: Orthotomicus; Ferrari, 1867

= Orthotomicus =

Genus of beetles

Orthotomicus is a genus of typical bark beetles in the family Curculionidae. There are about nine described species in Orthotomicus.

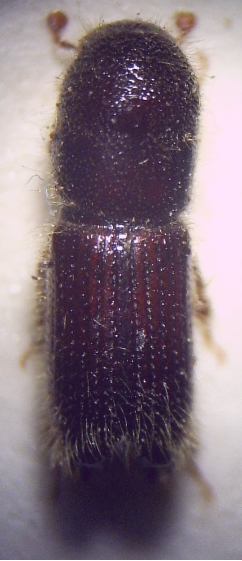
Orthotomicus longicollis

== Species ==
These nine species belong to the genus Orthotomicus:

- Orthotomicus caelatus (Eichhoff, 1868)^{i c b}
- Orthotomicus erosus Bright & Skidmore, 1997^{c g b} (Mediterranean pine engraver)
- Orthotomicus laricis (Fabricius, J.C., 1792)^{c g}
- Orthotomicus latidens Wood & Bright, 1992^{c g b}
- Orthotomicus mannsfeldi Wachtl, 1879^{c g}
- Orthotomicus proximus Eichhoff, 1867^{c g}
- Orthotomicus spinifer (Eichhoff, 1878)^{c b}
- Orthotomicus suturalis Gyllenhal, 1827^{c g}
- Orthotomicus tridentatus Eggers, 1921^{g}

Data sources: i = ITIS, c = Catalogue of Life, g = GBIF, b = Bugguide.net
