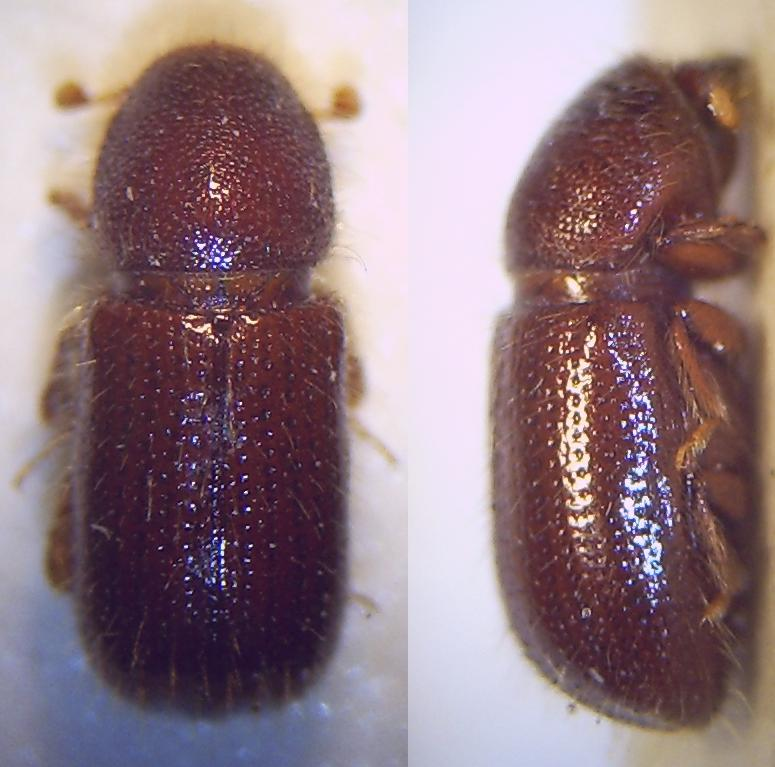

Scientific classification
- Domain: Eukaryota
- Kingdom: Animalia
- Phylum: Arthropoda
- Class: Insecta
- Order: Coleoptera
- Suborder: Polyphaga
- Infraorder: Cucujiformia
- Family: Curculionidae
- Genus: Dryocoetes
- Species: D. autographus

Binomial name
- Dryocoetes autographus (Ratzeburg, 1837)

= Dryocoetes autographus =

Species of beetle

Dryocoetes autographus is a species of weevil native to Europe.
