= Micracis festiva =

Scientific classification
- Domain: Eukaryota
- Kingdom: Animalia
- Phylum: Arthropoda
- Class: Insecta
- Order: Coleoptera
- Suborder: Polyphaga
- Infraorder: Cucujiformia
- Family: Curculionidae
- Genus: Micracis
- Species: M. festiva

Binomial name
- Micracis festiva Wood, 1969

Species of beetle

Micracis festiva is a species of typical bark beetle in the family Curculionidae. There are over 60 described of it found in Mexico.
