= Hylocurus parkinsoniae =

Scientific classification
- Domain: Eukaryota
- Kingdom: Animalia
- Phylum: Arthropoda
- Class: Insecta
- Order: Coleoptera
- Suborder: Polyphaga
- Infraorder: Cucujiformia
- Family: Curculionidae
- Genus: Hylocurus
- Species: H. parkinsoniae

Binomial name
- Hylocurus parkinsoniae Blackman, 1922

Species of beetle

Hylocurus parkinsoniae is a species in the family Curculionidae ("snout and bark beetles"), in the order Coleoptera ("beetles"). It is found in North America.
