= Conophthorus coniperda =

Scientific classification
- Kingdom: Animalia
- Phylum: Arthropoda
- Clade: Pancrustacea
- Class: Insecta
- Order: Coleoptera
- Suborder: Polyphaga
- Infraorder: Cucujiformia
- Family: Curculionidae
- Genus: Conophthorus
- Species: C. coniperda

Binomial name
- Conophthorus coniperda (Schwarz, 1895)

Species of beetle

Conophthorus coniperda, the white pine cone beetle, is a species of typical bark beetle in the family Curculionidae.
