= Xyloterinus =

Scientific classification
- Kingdom: Animalia
- Phylum: Arthropoda
- Class: Insecta
- Order: Coleoptera
- Suborder: Polyphaga
- Infraorder: Cucujiformia
- Family: Curculionidae
- Tribe: Scolytini
- Genus: Xyloterinus; Swaine, 1918

Type species
- Xyloterinus politus (Say, 1826)

Genus of beetles

Xyloterinus is a genus of typical bark beetles in the family Curculionidae. This is a monotypic genus and the one described species is Xyloterinus politus. It is native to North America where it infests both hardwood and softwood trees, as well as stacks of logs.

== Description ==
Adult beetles are between 2.3 and 3.5 mm (0.09 and 0.14 in) in length and are a dark brown or blackish colour. The prothorax is squarish and has spines and two to four teeth at the front. The elytra (wing-covers) are a rufous brown colour and covered with a felting of yellowish bristles. The entrance to the galleries in which the larvae develop is about 1.6 mm (0.06 in) in diameter.

== Distribution and habitat ==
This beetle is native to eastern North America, where it is present in both Canada and the United States. It infests both hardwoods and softwoods, mostly recently fallen or cut timber. Host trees include Acer, Alnus, Betula, Carya, Castanea, Fagus, Fraxinus, Picea, Pinus, Quercus, Tsuga, and Ulmus.

== Ecology ==
After mating, the adult female tunnels into the bark, creating a gallery up to 45 mm (1.8 in) long in the sapwood. Like other ambrosia beetles, the female carries a fungal culture with which to inoculate the walls of the galleries. On either side of the original tunnel she creates two further galleries about 14 mm (0.6 in) long. The eggs are laid singly, each in a cup-shaped cradle beside the side gallery, the entrance of the cradle being plugged by frass. The eggs hatch within about fourteen hours, and the larvae feed on the mycelia and spores of the fungus, enlarging the cradle as they grow. Wood fragments accumulate in the main tunnel and may escape from or be pushed out of the entrance by the female. The larvae take about 19 days to develop fully, before pupating. The new adults exit the cradle and then turn round and re-enter, feeding on the ambrosial growth. They overwinter in the empty cradles and galleries and exit the wood through the original entrance.
