= Thysanoes fimbricornis =

Scientific classification
- Kingdom: Animalia
- Phylum: Arthropoda
- Class: Insecta
- Order: Coleoptera
- Suborder: Polyphaga
- Infraorder: Cucujiformia
- Family: Curculionidae
- Genus: Thysanoes
- Species: T. fimbricornis

Binomial name
- Thysanoes fimbricornis LeConte, 1876

Species of beetle

Thysanoes fimbricornis is a species of typical bark beetle in the family Curculionidae. It is found in North America.
