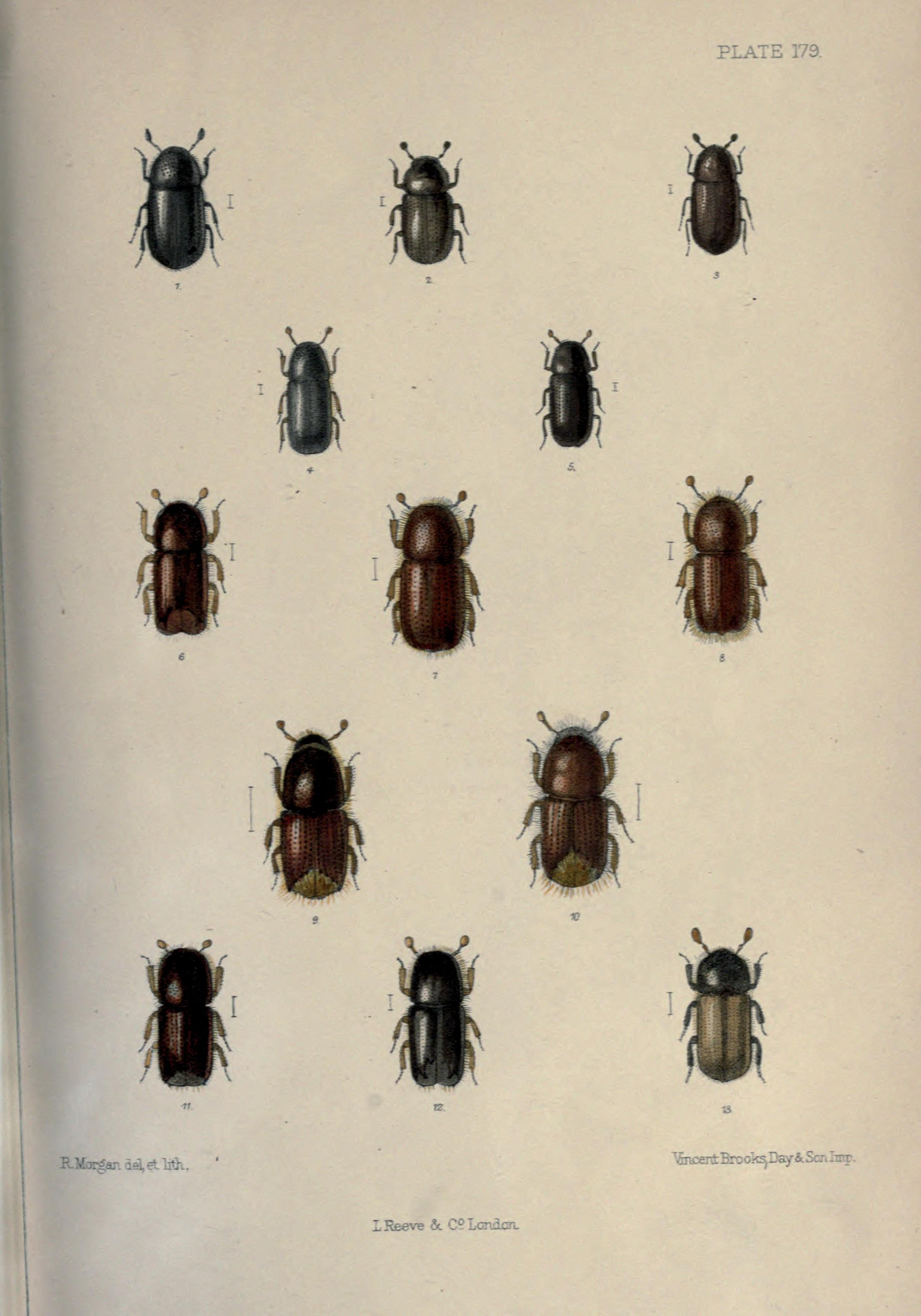
- Dryocoetes villosus figure 2

Scientific classification
- Kingdom: Animalia
- Phylum: Arthropoda
- Clade: Pancrustacea
- Class: Insecta
- Order: Coleoptera
- Suborder: Polyphaga
- Infraorder: Cucujiformia
- Superfamily: Curculionoidea
- Family: Curculionidae
- Genus: Dryocoetes
- Species: D. villosus

Binomial name
- Dryocoetes villosus (Fabricius, 1792)

= Dryocoetes villosus =

Species of beetle

Dryocoetes villosus is a species of weevil native to Europe.
