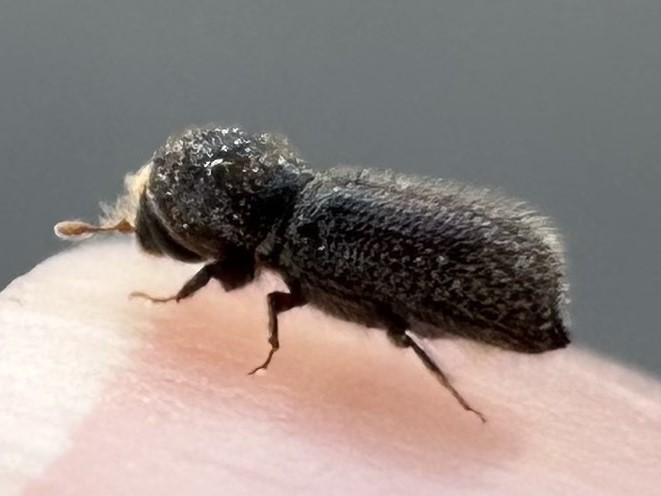
- Hylocurus hirtellus

Scientific classification
- Kingdom: Animalia
- Phylum: Arthropoda
- Class: Insecta
- Order: Coleoptera
- Suborder: Polyphaga
- Infraorder: Cucujiformia
- Family: Curculionidae
- Subfamily: Scolytinae
- Tribe: Scolytini
- Genus: Hylocurus; W.J.Eichhoff, 1872

= Hylocurus =

Genus of beetles

Hylocurus is a genus of typical bark beetles in the family Curculionidae.

== Species ==
The following species are recognised in the genus Hylocurus:

- Hylocurus aberrans Wood, 1969
- Hylocurus absonus Bright, 2019
- Hylocurus acuminatus Schedl, 1950
- Hylocurus acutedentatus Schedl, 1978
- Hylocurus aequalis Wood, 2007
- Hylocurus africanus Schedl, 1957
- Hylocurus alienus Eichhoff, 1878
- Hylocurus alternatus Eggers, 1951
- Hylocurus alternus Wood, 1969
- Hylocurus antillicus Bright, 2019
- Hylocurus atkinsoni Wood, 1987
- Hylocurus beckeri Heqvist, 1954
- Hylocurus biconcavus Blackman, 1943
- Hylocurus bicornus Wood & Bright, 1992
- Hylocurus bidentatus Schedl, 1950
- Hylocurus binodatus Wood, 1974
- Hylocurus brasiliensis Nunberg, 1956
- Hylocurus bugekeae Schedl, 1957
- Hylocurus cancellatus Blandford, 1898
- Hylocurus carinifrons Atkinson, 1989
- Hylocurus clarki Wood, 1979
- Hylocurus colombianus Wood, 2007
- Hylocurus crinitus Blackman, 1943
- Hylocurus crotonis Wood, 1987
- Hylocurus cuspidatus Eggers, 1951
- Hylocurus declivis Wood, 2007
- Hylocurus denticollis Schedl, 1976
- Hylocurus dilutus Wood, 1971
- Hylocurus dimorphus Wood & Bright, 1992
- Hylocurus discifer Eichhoff, 1878
- Hylocurus disparilis Wood, 1971
- Hylocurus dissidens Wood, 1971
- Hylocurus dissimilis Wood, 1984
- Hylocurus dubius Schedl, 1959
- Hylocurus effeminatus Wood, 1956
- Hylocurus egenus Blandford, 1898
- Hylocurus elegans Eichhoff, 1872
- Hylocurus equidens Wood, 1956
- Hylocurus errans Blandford, 1898
- Hylocurus femineus Wood, 1959
- Hylocurus flagellatus Wood, 1971
- Hylocurus flaglerensis Blackman, 1943
- Hylocurus fletchmanni Wood, 2007
- Hylocurus floridensis Atkinson, 1989
- Hylocurus giganteus Wood & Bright, 1992
- Hylocurus harnedi Wood & Bright, 1992
- Hylocurus hirtellus Wood & Bright, 1992
- Hylocurus impar Schedl, 1939
- Hylocurus inaequalis Wood, 1956
- Hylocurus inaequidens Wood, 2007
- Hylocurus incomptus Wood, 1969
- Hylocurus intermedius Schedl, 1952
- Hylocurus interpositus Schedl, 1976
- Hylocurus interruptus Schedl, 1959
- Hylocurus langstoni Blackman, 1920
- Hylocurus longipennis Wood, 1979
- Hylocurus longulus Wood, 2007
- Hylocurus medius Wood, 1956
- Hylocurus micaceus Wood, 1984
- Hylocurus microcornis Wood, 1969
- Hylocurus minor Wood, 1961
- Hylocurus nivalis Wood, 1974
- Hylocurus nodifer Wood, 2007
- Hylocurus nodulus Wood, 1956
- Hylocurus obtusipennis Schedl, 1976
- Hylocurus parkinsoniae Blackman, 1922
- Hylocurus pilosus Schedl, 1950
- Hylocurus plaumanni Wood, 2007
- Hylocurus prolatus Wood, 1982
- Hylocurus pseudoimpar Schedl, 1954
- Hylocurus punctatorugosus Wood & Bright, 1992
- Hylocurus quadrispinosus Blackman, 1928
- Hylocurus rectus Schedl, 1958
- Hylocurus retusipennis Blandford, 1898
- Hylocurus robustus Schedl, 1952
- Hylocurus ruber Wood, 1956
- Hylocurus rudis (LeConte, 1876) Douglas, Bouchard, Anderson, Tonnancour, Vigneault & Webster, 2013
- Hylocurus rudis Wood & Bright, 1992
- Hylocurus schwarzi Blackman, 1928
- Hylocurus scitulus Wood, 1984
- Hylocurus secus Wood, 1984
- Hylocurus simplex Blandford, 1898
- Hylocurus singularis Wood, 1971
- Hylocurus spadix Blackman, 1928
- Hylocurus spinifex Blandford, 1904
- Hylocurus stachi Nunberg, 1958
- Hylocurus subgranulatus Schedl, 1954
- Hylocurus torosus Wood, 1971
- Hylocurus touroulti Bright, 2019
- Hylocurus tresmariae Schedl, 1956
- Hylocurus trispinatus Schedl, 1978
- Hylocurus tumidosus Bright, 2019
- Hylocurus vagabundus Blandford, 1898
- Hylocurus verrucosus Wood, 1971
- Hylocurus vianai Schedl, 1952
- Hylocurus villifrons Wood, 1971
- Hylocurus woytkowskii Wood, 2007
