= Crypturgus alutaceus =

Scientific classification
- Kingdom: Animalia
- Phylum: Arthropoda
- Clade: Pancrustacea
- Class: Insecta
- Order: Coleoptera
- Suborder: Polyphaga
- Infraorder: Cucujiformia
- Family: Curculionidae
- Genus: Crypturgus
- Species: C. alutaceus

Binomial name
- Crypturgus alutaceus Schwarz, 1894

Species of beetle

Crypturgus alutaceus is a species of typical bark beetle in the family Curculionidae. It is found in North America.
