= Thysanoes texanus =

Scientific classification
- Kingdom: Animalia
- Phylum: Arthropoda
- Clade: Pancrustacea
- Class: Insecta
- Order: Coleoptera
- Suborder: Polyphaga
- Infraorder: Cucujiformia
- Family: Curculionidae
- Genus: Thysanoes
- Species: T. texanus

Binomial name
- Thysanoes texanus Blackman, 1943

Species of beetle

Thysanoes texanus is a species of typical bark beetle in the family Curculionidae. It is found in North America.
