= Pityoborus comatus =

Scientific classification
- Kingdom: Animalia
- Phylum: Arthropoda
- Clade: Pancrustacea
- Class: Insecta
- Order: Coleoptera
- Suborder: Polyphaga
- Infraorder: Cucujiformia
- Family: Curculionidae
- Genus: Pityoborus
- Species: P. comatus

Binomial name
- Pityoborus comatus (Zimmermann, 1868)

Species of beetle

Pityoborus comatus is a species of typical bark beetle in the family Curculionidae. It is found in North America.
