= Pityophthorus consimilis =

Scientific classification
- Kingdom: Animalia
- Phylum: Arthropoda
- Clade: Pancrustacea
- Class: Insecta
- Order: Coleoptera
- Suborder: Polyphaga
- Infraorder: Cucujiformia
- Superfamily: Curculionoidea
- Family: Curculionidae
- Genus: Pityophthorus
- Species: P. consimilis

Binomial name
- Pityophthorus consimilis LeConte, 1878

Species of beetle

Pityophthorus consimilis is a species of typical bark beetle in the family Curculionidae. It is found in North America.
