= Micracis suturalis =

Scientific classification
- Domain: Eukaryota
- Kingdom: Animalia
- Phylum: Arthropoda
- Class: Insecta
- Order: Coleoptera
- Suborder: Polyphaga
- Infraorder: Cucujiformia
- Family: Curculionidae
- Genus: Micracis
- Species: M. suturalis

Binomial name
- Micracis suturalis LeConte, 1868

Species of beetle

Micracis suturalis is a species of typical bark beetle in the family Curculionidae. It is found in North America.
