= Micracis =

Scientific classification
- Domain: Eukaryota
- Kingdom: Animalia
- Phylum: Arthropoda
- Class: Insecta
- Order: Coleoptera
- Suborder: Polyphaga
- Infraorder: Cucujiformia
- Family: Curculionidae
- Tribe: Scolytini
- Genus: Micracis; LeConte, 1868

Genus of beetles

Micracis is a genus of typical bark beetles in the family Curculionidae. There are more than 60 described species in Micracis.

== Species ==
These 63 species belong to the genus Micracis:

- Micracis aculeatus LeConte, 1868
- Micracis acutipennis Eichhoff, 1878b
- Micracis amplinis Wood, 1971
- Micracis asperulus LeConte, 1878b
- Micracis bicornus Blackman, 1920a
- Micracis biorbis Blackman, 1920a
- Micracis burgosi Wood, 1982a
- Micracis carinulata Wood, 1960b
- Micracis carinulatus Wood, 1960
- Micracis carinulus Wood, 1969b
- Micracis costaricensis Wood, 1969b
- Micracis cubensis Blackman, 1928a
- Micracis detenta Wood, 1969b
- Micracis detentus Wood, 1969b
- Micracis difficilis Schedl, 1965c
- Micracis dimorphus Schedl
- Micracis evanescens Wood, 1956a
- Micracis exilis Wood, 1971
- Micracis festiva Wood, 1969b
- Micracis festivus Wood, 1969b
- Micracis giganteus Schedl
- Micracis grandis Schedl, 1948h
- Micracis harnedi Blackman, 1920a
- Micracis harunganae Schedl
- Micracis hirtellus Leconte, 1876
- Micracis ignotus Schedl, 1965c
- Micracis incerta Wood, 1971
- Micracis incertus Wood, 1971
- Micracis inimicus Wood, 1969b
- Micracis knulli Blackman, 1943a
- Micracis langstoni Blackman
- Micracis lepida Wood, 1969b
- Micracis lepidus Wood, 1969b
- Micracis lignator Blackman, 1928
- Micracis lignicolus Wood, 1969b
- Micracis longula Nunberg, 1956a
- Micracis madagascariensis Schedl
- Micracis meridianus Blackman, 1920a
- Micracis mexicanus Schedl, 1948h
- Micracis minimus Wood, 2007
- Micracis nanula Leconte, 1876
- Micracis opacicollis LeConte, 1878b
- Micracis opacithorax Schedl, 1940a
- Micracis ovata Wood, 1956a
- Micracis ovatus Wood, 1956a
- Micracis pennatus Schedl, 1965c
- Micracis photophilus Wood, 1956a
- Micracis populi Blackman, 1920a
- Micracis punctatorugosus Schedl, 1948h
- Micracis pygmaeus Schedl, 1948h
- Micracis robustus Schedl, 1948h
- Micracis rudis Leconte, 1876
- Micracis senta Wood, 1971
- Micracis sentus Wood, 1971
- Micracis suturalis LeConte, 1868
- Micracis swainei Blackman, 1920
- Micracis torus Wood, 1971
- Micracis tribulata Wood, 1969b
- Micracis tribulatus Wood, 1969b
- Micracis tropicus Wood, 2007
- Micracis truncatus Wood, 1956a
- Micracis unicornis Wood, 1969b
- Micracis vitulus Wood, 1971
