= Micracis swainei =

Scientific classification
- Kingdom: Animalia
- Phylum: Arthropoda
- Clade: Pancrustacea
- Class: Insecta
- Order: Coleoptera
- Suborder: Polyphaga
- Infraorder: Cucujiformia
- Family: Curculionidae
- Genus: Micracis
- Species: M. swainei

Binomial name
- Micracis swainei Blackman, 1920

Species of beetle

Micracis swainei is a species of typical bark beetle in the family Curculionidae. It is found in North America.
