= Conophthorus ponderosae =

Scientific classification
- Kingdom: Animalia
- Phylum: Arthropoda
- Clade: Pancrustacea
- Class: Insecta
- Order: Coleoptera
- Suborder: Polyphaga
- Infraorder: Cucujiformia
- Family: Curculionidae
- Genus: Conophthorus
- Species: C. ponderosae

Binomial name
- Conophthorus ponderosae Hopkins, 1915

Synonyms
- Conophthorus lambertianae Hopkins, 1915

Species of beetle

Conophthorus ponderosae, known generally as the lodgepole cone beetle or sugar pinecone beetle, is a species of typical bark beetle in the family Curculionidae. It is found in North America.
