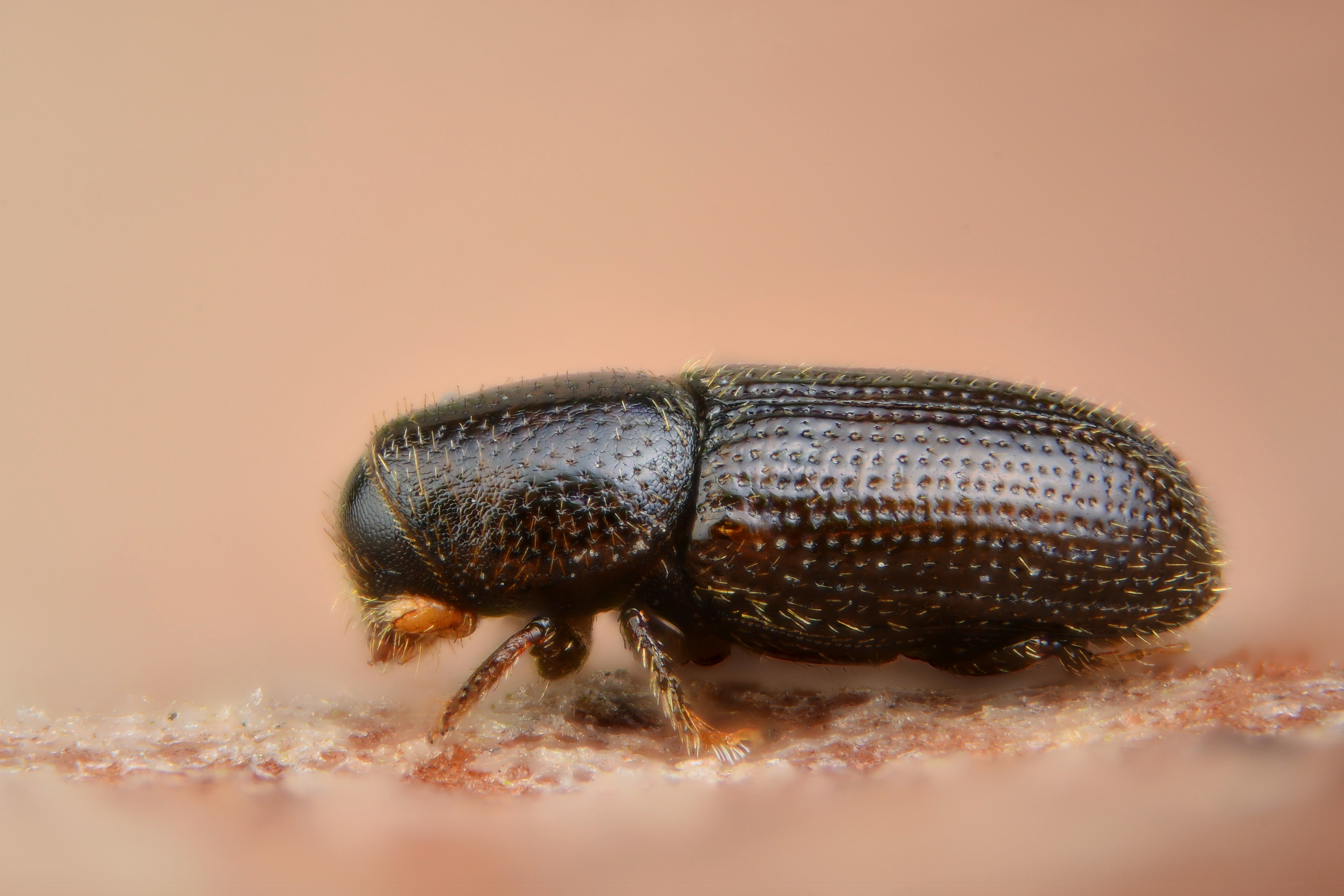
- Crypturgus pusillus

Scientific classification
- Kingdom: Animalia
- Phylum: Arthropoda
- Class: Insecta
- Order: Coleoptera
- Suborder: Polyphaga
- Infraorder: Cucujiformia
- Family: Curculionidae
- Tribe: Scolytini
- Genus: Crypturgus; Erichson, 1836

= Crypturgus =

Genus of beetles

Crypturgus is a genus of typical bark beetles in the family Curculionidae. There are at least 30 described species in Crypturgus.

== Species ==
These 37 species belong to the genus Crypturgus:

- Crypturgus abbreviatus Eggers, 1911a^{c}
- Crypturgus alutaceus Schwarz, 1894^{i c b}
- Crypturgus apfelbecki Eggers, 1940g^{c}
- Crypturgus atomus LeConte, 1868^{c}
- Crypturgus atticus Eggers, 1911a^{c}
- Crypturgus barbeyi Strohmeyer, H., 1929b^{c}
- Crypturgus beesoni Eggers, 1936d^{c}
- Crypturgus borealis Swaine, 1917^{i c b}
- Crypturgus brevipennis Reitter, 1913a^{c}
- Crypturgus cedris Eichhoff, 1868b^{c}
- Crypturgus cinereus (Herbst, J.F.W., 1793)^{c g}
- Crypturgus comatus Zimmermann, 1868^{c}
- Crypturgus concolor Wood & Bright, 1992^{c}
- Crypturgus corrugatus Swaine, J.M., 1917^{c}
- Crypturgus corsicus Eggers, 1923b^{c}
- Crypturgus crebrellus Reitter, 1894a^{c}
- Crypturgus cribrellus Reitter, 1895^{g}
- Crypturgus cylindricollis Eggers, 1940g^{c}
- Crypturgus danicus Eggers, 1932e^{c}
- Crypturgus dissimilis Zimmermann, 1868^{c}
- Crypturgus dubius Eichhoff, 1875^{c}
- Crypturgus filum Reitter, 1889b^{c}
- Crypturgus gaunersdorferi Reitter, 1885b^{c}
- Crypturgus hispidulus Thomson, C.G., 1870^{c}
- Crypturgus japonicus Schedl (Eggers in), 1979c^{c}
- Crypturgus maulei Roubal, 1910^{c}
- Crypturgus mediterraneus Eichhoff, W.J., 1869^{c}
- Crypturgus minutissimus Zimmermann, 1868^{c}
- Crypturgus numidicus Ferrari, 1867a^{c}
- Crypturgus parallelocollis Eichhoff, 1878b^{c}
- Crypturgus pulicarius Zimmermann, 1868^{c}
- Crypturgus pullus Zimmermann, 1868^{c}
- Crypturgus punctatissimus Zimmermann, 1868^{c}
- Crypturgus pusillus (Gyllenhal, 1813)^{i c b}
- Crypturgus subcribrosus Eggers, 1933f^{c}
- Crypturgus tuberosus Niisima, 1909^{c}
- Crypturgus wollastoni Eichhoff, 1878b^{c}

Data sources: i = ITIS, c = Catalogue of Life, g = GBIF, b = Bugguide.net
