= Hylocurus spadix =

Scientific classification
- Kingdom: Animalia
- Phylum: Arthropoda
- Clade: Pancrustacea
- Class: Insecta
- Order: Coleoptera
- Suborder: Polyphaga
- Infraorder: Cucujiformia
- Family: Curculionidae
- Genus: Hylocurus
- Species: H. spadix

Binomial name
- Hylocurus spadix Blackman, 1928

Species of beetle

Hylocurus spadix is a species of typical bark beetle in the family Curculionidae. It is found in North America.
