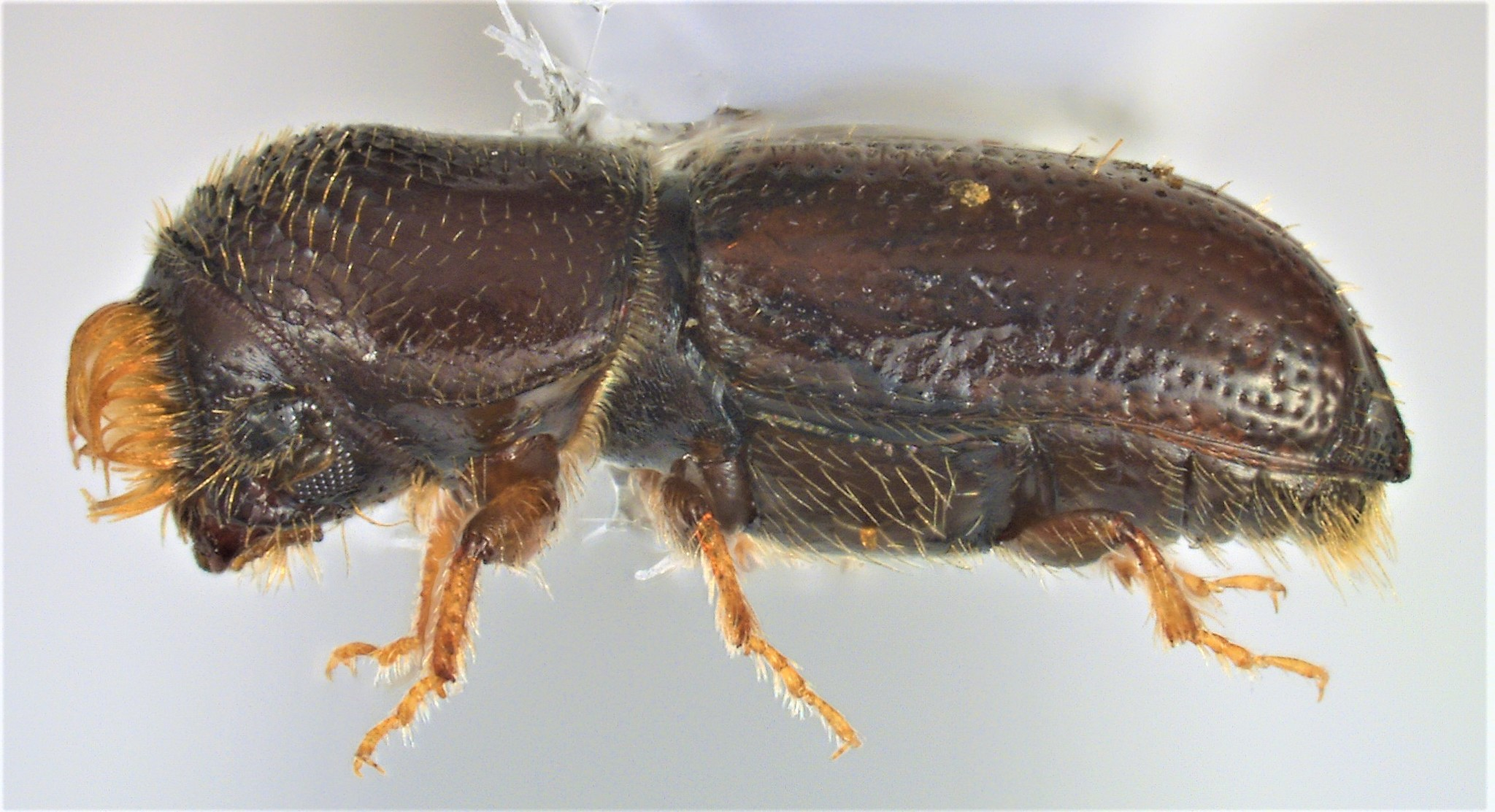

Scientific classification
- Kingdom: Animalia
- Phylum: Arthropoda
- Class: Insecta
- Order: Coleoptera
- Suborder: Polyphaga
- Infraorder: Cucujiformia
- Family: Curculionidae
- Genus: Pityophthorus
- Species: P. annectens

Binomial name
- Pityophthorus annectens LeConte, 1878

= Pityophthorus annectens =

Species of beetle

Pityophthorus annectens is a species of typical bark beetle in the family Curculionidae. It is found in North America.
