= Cactopinus pini =

Scientific classification
- Kingdom: Animalia
- Phylum: Arthropoda
- Clade: Pancrustacea
- Class: Insecta
- Order: Coleoptera
- Suborder: Polyphaga
- Infraorder: Cucujiformia
- Family: Curculionidae
- Genus: Cactopinus
- Species: C. pini

Binomial name
- Cactopinus pini Blackman, 1938

Species of beetle

Cactopinus pini is a species of typical bark beetle in the family Curculionidae. It is endemic to North America.
