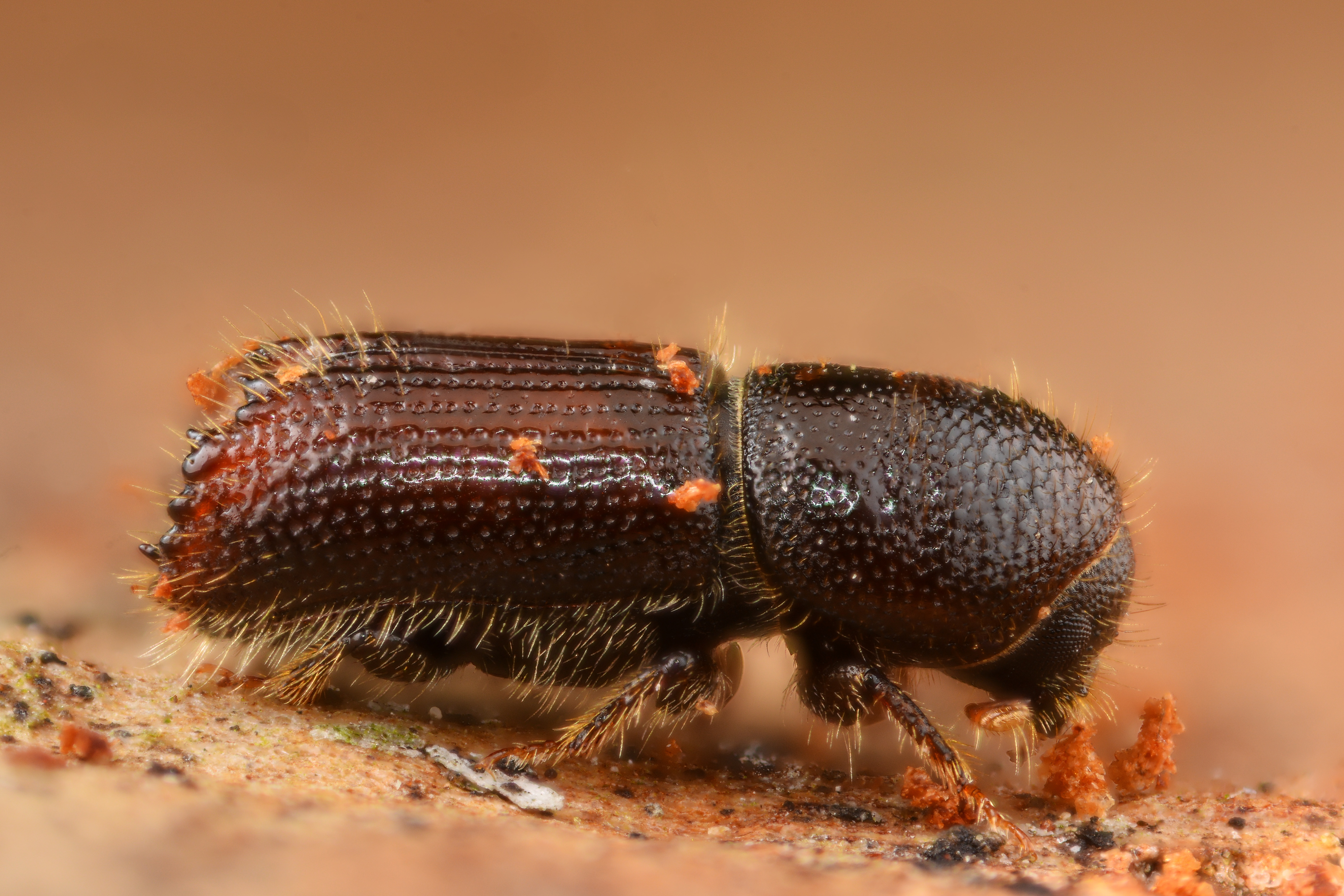

Scientific classification
- Kingdom: Animalia
- Phylum: Arthropoda
- Clade: Pancrustacea
- Class: Insecta
- Order: Coleoptera
- Suborder: Polyphaga
- Infraorder: Cucujiformia
- Superfamily: Curculionoidea
- Family: Curculionidae
- Genus: Orthotomicus
- Species: O. laricis

Binomial name
- Orthotomicus laricis (Fabricius, 1792)

= Orthotomicus laricis =

Species of beetle

Orthotomicus laricis, commonly known as the lesser larch bark beetle, is a species of weevil native to Europe.
