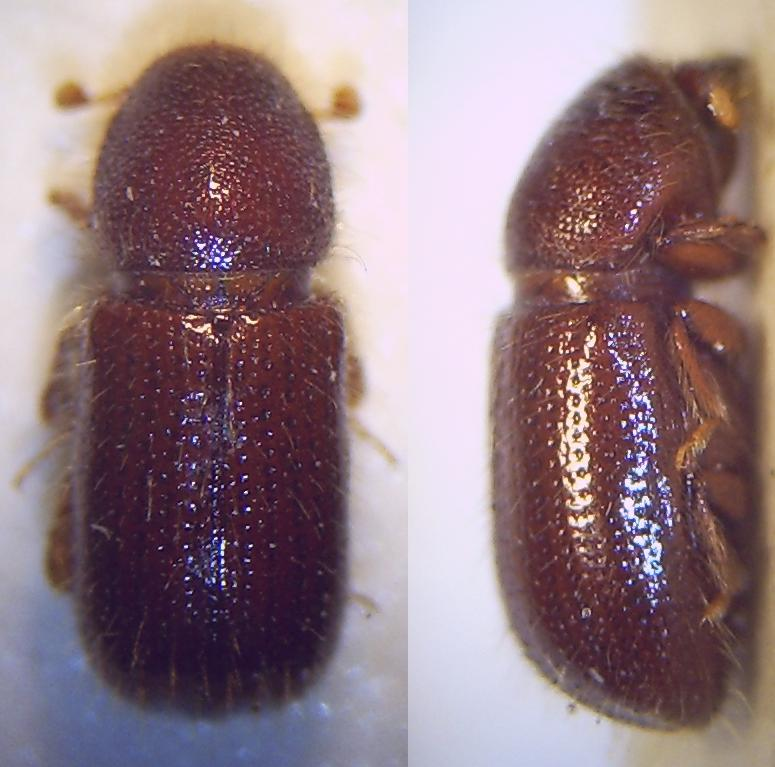
- Dryocoetes autographus

Scientific classification
- Domain: Eukaryota
- Kingdom: Animalia
- Phylum: Arthropoda
- Class: Insecta
- Order: Coleoptera
- Suborder: Polyphaga
- Infraorder: Cucujiformia
- Family: Curculionidae
- Subfamily: Scolytinae
- Tribe: Scolytini
- Genus: Dryocoetes; Eichhoff, 1864

= Dryocoetes =

Genus of beetles

Dryocoetes is a genus of beetles belonging to the family Curculionidae, in the subfamily Scolytinae (bark beetles).

The species in this genus are found in North America, Asia, Europe, and Africa. They feed on Abies, Betula, Fagus, Liquidambar, Picea, Pinus, Pseudotsuga, Tsuga deciduous and conifer trees.

- Dryocoetes abietinus Kono & Tamanuki, 1939
- Dryocoetes abietis Hopkins, 1915b
- Dryocoetes affaber LeConte, 1876
- Dryocoetes alni (Georg, 1856)
- Dryocoetes autographus (Ratzeburg, 1837)
- Dryocoetes baicalicus Reitter, 1899
- Dryocoetes betulae Hopkins, 1915
- Dryocoetes confusus Swaine, 1912 (Western balsam bark beetle)
- Dryocoetes granicollis
- Dryocoetes hectographus Reitter, 1913
- Dryocoetes himalayensis Strohmeyer, 1908
- Dryocoetes indicus Stebbing, 1914
- Dryocoetes luteus Blandford, 1894
- Dryocoetes pini
- Dryocoetes quadrisulcatus Strohmeyer, 1908
- Dryocoetes striatus Eggers, 1933
- Dryocoetes uniseriatus Eggers, 1926
- Dryocoetes villosus (Fabricius, 1792)
