= Cactopinus rhois =

Scientific classification
- Kingdom: Animalia
- Phylum: Arthropoda
- Clade: Pancrustacea
- Class: Insecta
- Order: Coleoptera
- Suborder: Polyphaga
- Infraorder: Cucujiformia
- Family: Curculionidae
- Genus: Cactopinus
- Species: C. rhois

Binomial name
- Cactopinus rhois Blackman, 1938

Species of beetle

Cactopinus rhois is a species of typical bark beetle in the family Curculionidae. It is found in North America.
