= Orthotomicus caelatus =

Scientific classification
- Kingdom: Animalia
- Phylum: Arthropoda
- Clade: Pancrustacea
- Class: Insecta
- Order: Coleoptera
- Suborder: Polyphaga
- Infraorder: Cucujiformia
- Family: Curculionidae
- Genus: Orthotomicus
- Species: O. caelatus

Binomial name
- Orthotomicus caelatus (Eichhoff, 1868)

Species of beetle

Orthotomicus caelatus is a species of typical bark beetle in the family Curculionidae.
