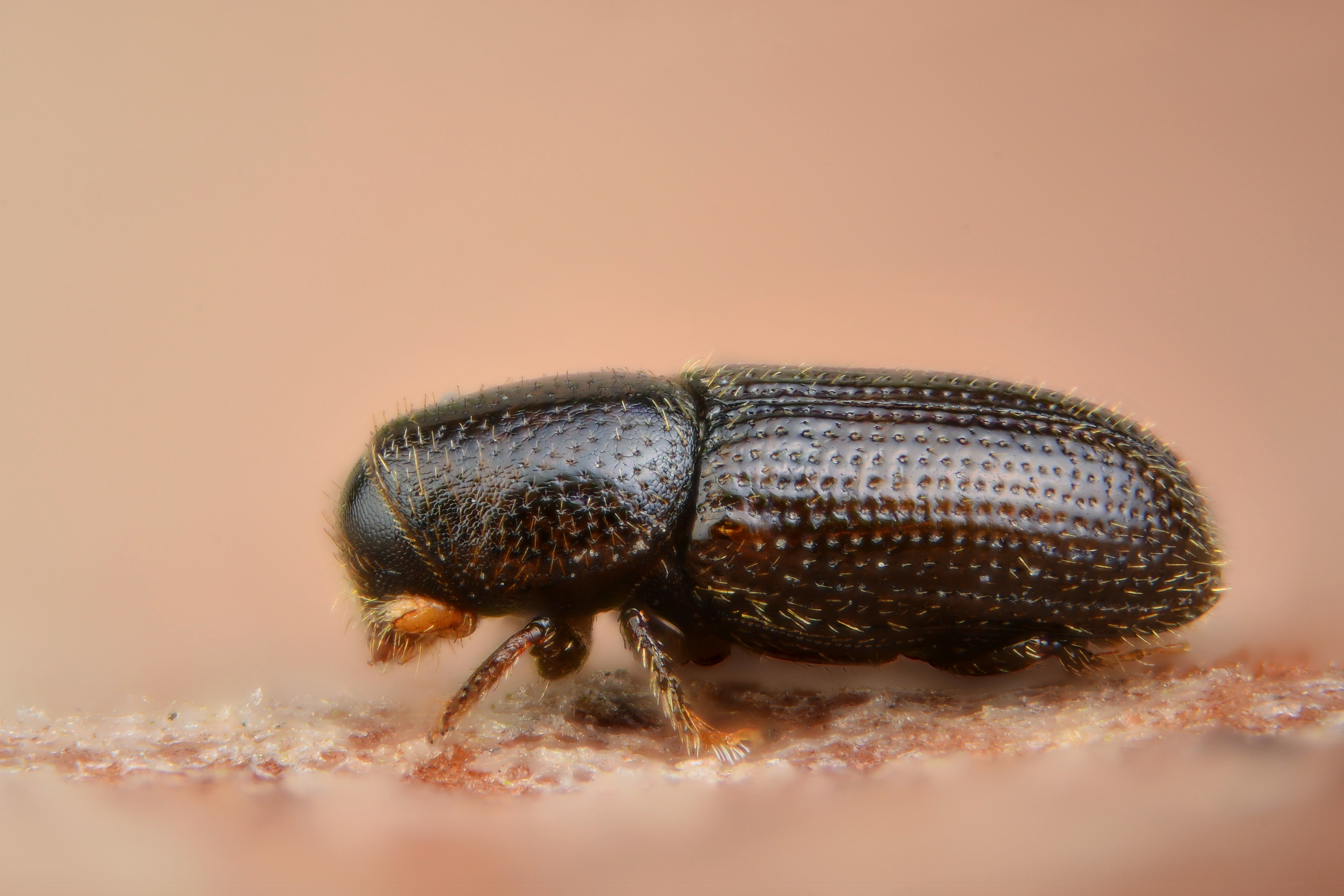

Scientific classification
- Kingdom: Animalia
- Phylum: Arthropoda
- Clade: Pancrustacea
- Class: Insecta
- Order: Coleoptera
- Suborder: Polyphaga
- Infraorder: Cucujiformia
- Family: Curculionidae
- Genus: Crypturgus
- Species: C. pusillus

Binomial name
- Crypturgus pusillus (Gyllenhal, 1813)

= Crypturgus pusillus =

Species of beetle

Crypturgus pusillus is a species of typical bark beetle in the family Curculionidae.

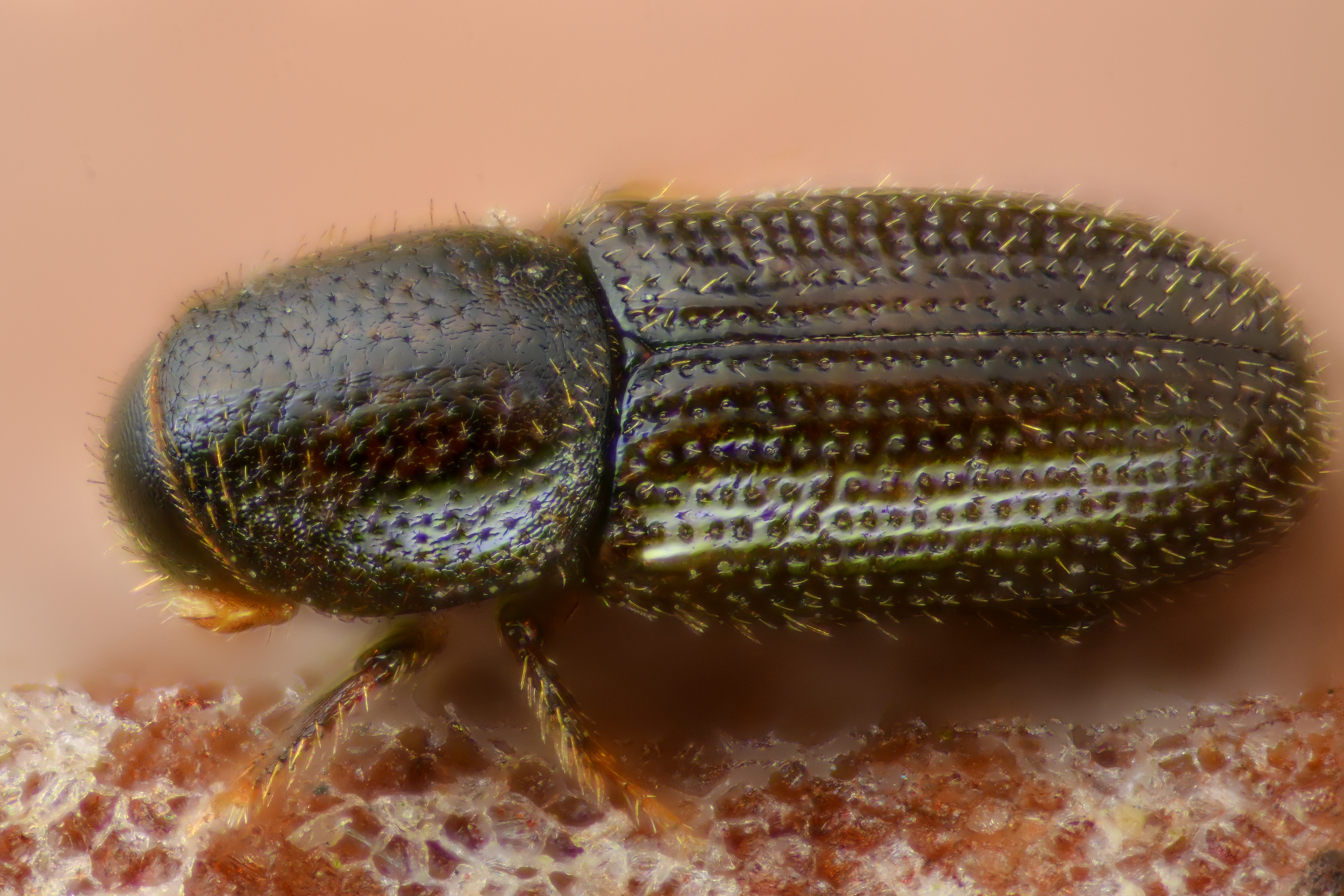
