= Dendroterus striatus =

Scientific classification
- Domain: Eukaryota
- Kingdom: Animalia
- Phylum: Arthropoda
- Class: Insecta
- Order: Coleoptera
- Suborder: Polyphaga
- Infraorder: Cucujiformia
- Family: Curculionidae
- Genus: Dendroterus
- Species: D. striatus

Binomial name
- Dendroterus striatus (LeConte, 1868)

Species of beetle

Dendroterus striatus is a species of typical bark beetle in the family Curculionidae. It is found in North America.
