= Premnobius =

Scientific classification
- Domain: Eukaryota
- Kingdom: Animalia
- Phylum: Arthropoda
- Class: Insecta
- Order: Coleoptera
- Suborder: Polyphaga
- Infraorder: Cucujiformia
- Family: Curculionidae
- Subtribe: Xyleborina
- Genus: Premnobius; Eichhoff, 1878

Genus of beetles

Premnobius is a genus of typical bark beetles in the family Curculionidae. There are more than 30 described species in Premnobius.

== Species ==
These 32 species belong to the genus Premnobius:

- Premnobius adjunctus Bright & Skidmore, 1997
- Premnobius ambitiosus Wood & Bright, 1992
- Premnobius amphicranoides Schedl
- Premnobius binodosus Nunberg, 1969a
- Premnobius bituberculatus Eggers, 1932c
- Premnobius brasiliensis Nunberg, 1958a
- Premnobius cavipennis Eichhoff, 1878
- Premnobius circumcinctus Schedl, 1941d
- Premnobius circumspinatus Eggers, 1924
- Premnobius corruptus Wood & Bright, 1992
- Premnobius corthyloides Hagedorn, 1910b
- Premnobius declivis Eggers, 1944b
- Premnobius familiaris Wood & Bright, 1992
- Premnobius felix Wood & Bright, 1992
- Premnobius hystrix Wood & Bright, 1992
- Premnobius ivoriensis Nunberg, 1969a
- Premnobius latior Eggers, 1933b
- Premnobius longus Eggers, 1932c
- Premnobius marginatus Eggers, 1932c
- Premnobius minor Eggers, 1927a
- Premnobius mukunyae Wood & Bright, 1992
- Premnobius nodulosus Hagedorn, 1908
- Premnobius orientalis Eggers, 1932c
- Premnobius perspinidens Browne, 1961d
- Premnobius pseudohystrix Wood & Bright, 1992
- Premnobius quadridens Eggers, 1927a
- Premnobius quadrispinosus Schedl, 1938h
- Premnobius robustulus Wood & Bright, 1992
- Premnobius sexnotatus Wood & Bright, 1992
- Premnobius sexspinosus Eggers, 1924
- Premnobius spinifer Eggers, 1927a
- Premnobius spinosus Hagedorn, 1908
