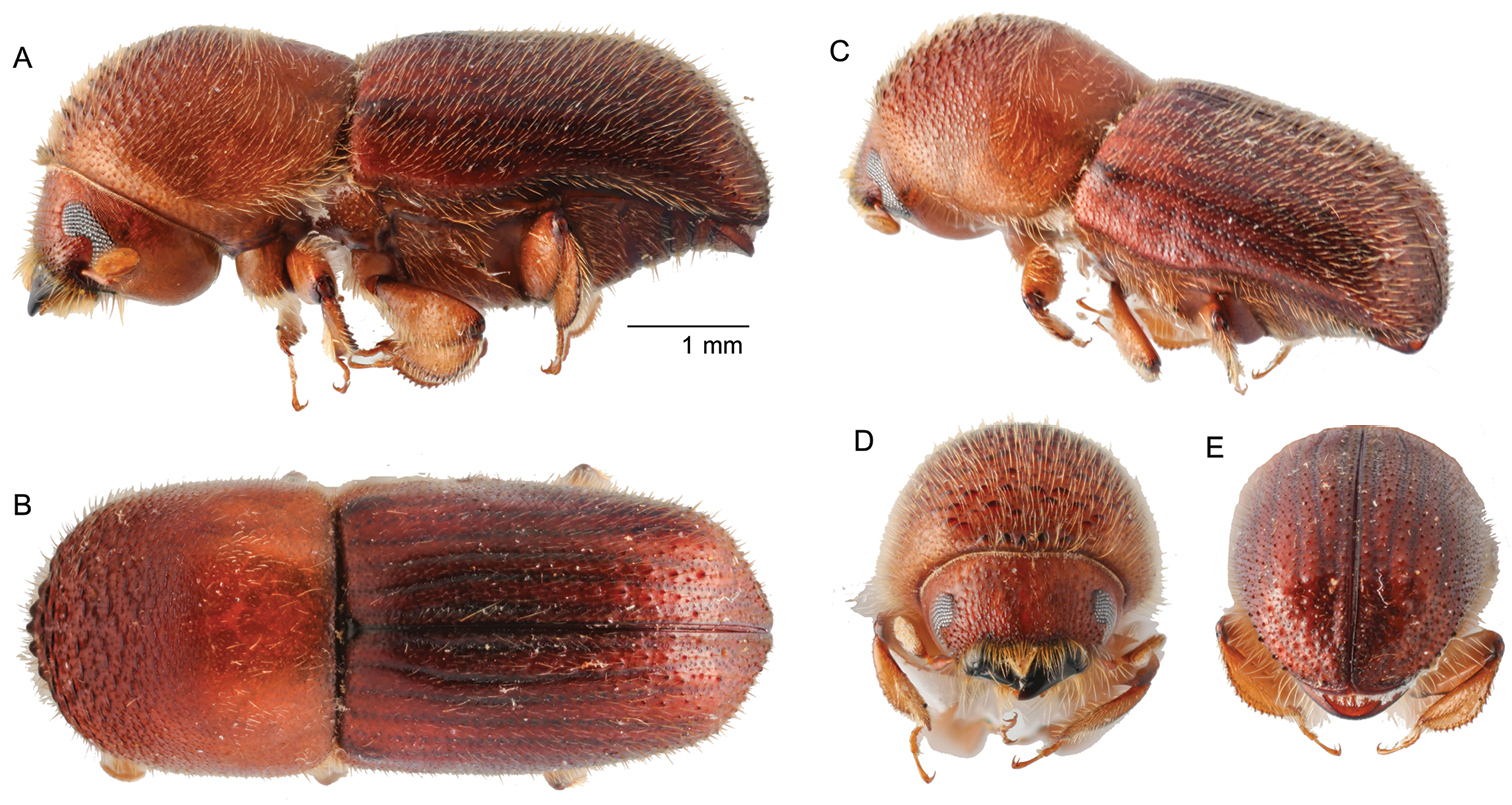
- Adult Cylorhipidion vigilans

Scientific classification
- Kingdom: Animalia
- Phylum: Arthropoda
- Clade: Pancrustacea
- Class: Insecta
- Order: Coleoptera
- Suborder: Polyphaga
- Infraorder: Cucujiformia
- Superfamily: Curculionoidea
- Family: Curculionidae
- Genus: Cyclorhipidion; Hagedorn, 1912

= Cyclorhipidion =

Genus of insects

Cyclorhipidion is a genus of beetles belonging to the family Curculionidae.

The genus has almost cosmopolitan distribution.

Species include:

- Cyclorhipidion agnaticeps Wood & Bright, 1992
- Cyclorhipidion agnatum Wood & Bright, 1992
- Cyclorhipidion amasoides Smith, Beaver & Cognato, 2020
- Cyclorhipidion amputatum Smith, Beaver & Cognato, 2020
- Cyclorhipidion bodoanus
- Cyclorhipidion denticauda Smith, Beaver & Cognato, 2020
- Cyclorhipidion muticum Smith, Beaver & Cognato, 2020
- Cyclorhipidion obesulum Smith, Beaver & Cognato, 2020
- Cyclorhipidion petrosum Smith, Beaver & Cognato, 2020
- Cyclorhipidion truncaudinum Smith, Beaver & Cognato, 2020
- Cyclorhipidion vigilans
- Cyclorhipidion xeniolum Smith, Beaver & Cognato, 2020
