= Pityoborus =

Scientific classification
- Domain: Eukaryota
- Kingdom: Animalia
- Phylum: Arthropoda
- Class: Insecta
- Order: Coleoptera
- Suborder: Polyphaga
- Infraorder: Cucujiformia
- Family: Curculionidae
- Subtribe: Pityophthorina
- Genus: Pityoborus; Blackman, 1922

Genus of beetles

Pityoborus is a genus of typical bark beetles in the family Curculionidae. There are about 12 described species in Pityoborus.

== Species ==
These 12 species belong to the genus Pityoborus:

- Pityoborus comatus (Zimmermann, 1868)
- Pityoborus frontalis Wood, 1971
- Pityoborus hirtellus Wood, 1958a
- Pityoborus hondurensis Wood, 1971
- Pityoborus immitus Bright, 1972c
- Pityoborus intonsus Wood, 1958a
- Pityoborus ramosus Bright, 1972c
- Pityoborus rubentis Wood, 1958a
- Pityoborus secundus Blackman, 1928
- Pityoborus severus Bright, 1972c
- Pityoborus tertius Blackman, 1942a
- Pityoborus velutinus Wood, 1958a
