= Dendroterus =

Scientific classification
- Domain: Eukaryota
- Kingdom: Animalia
- Phylum: Arthropoda
- Class: Insecta
- Order: Coleoptera
- Suborder: Polyphaga
- Infraorder: Cucujiformia
- Family: Curculionidae
- Subtribe: Pityophthorina
- Genus: Dendroterus; Blandford, 1904

Genus of beetles

Dendroterus is a genus of typical bark beetles in the family Curculionidae. There are about 17 described species in Dendroterus.

== Species ==
These 17 species belong to the genus Dendroterus:

- Dendroterus cognatus Wood, 1971
- Dendroterus confinis Wood, 1959b
- Dendroterus decipiens Wood, 1959b
- Dendroterus defectus Wood, 1971
- Dendroterus eximius Wood, 1971
- Dendroterus fossifrons Wood
- Dendroterus luteolus Wood & Bright, 1992
- Dendroterus mexicanus Blandford, 1904
- Dendroterus modicus Wood
- Dendroterus mundus Wood, 1959b
- Dendroterus parilis Wood, 1971
- Dendroterus perspectus Wood, 1959b
- Dendroterus resolutus Wood, 1971
- Dendroterus sallaei Blandford, 1904
- Dendroterus sodalis Wood, 1971
- Dendroterus striatus (LeConte, 1868)
- Dendroterus texanus Wood, 1959
