= Lymantor =

Scientific classification
- Domain: Eukaryota
- Kingdom: Animalia
- Phylum: Arthropoda
- Class: Insecta
- Order: Coleoptera
- Suborder: Polyphaga
- Infraorder: Cucujiformia
- Family: Curculionidae
- Genus: Lymantor

Genus of beetles

Lymantor is a genus of beetles belonging to the family Curculionidae.

The species of this genus are found in Europe and Northern America.

Species:

- Lymantor alaskanus Wood, 1978b
- Lymantor decipiens Wood & Bright, 1992
