= Pityotrichus =

Scientific classification
- Domain: Eukaryota
- Kingdom: Animalia
- Phylum: Arthropoda
- Class: Insecta
- Order: Coleoptera
- Suborder: Polyphaga
- Infraorder: Cucujiformia
- Family: Curculionidae
- Subtribe: Pityophthorina
- Genus: Pityotrichus; Wood, 1962

Genus of beetles

Pityotrichus is a genus of typical bark beetles in the family Curculionidae. There are at least three described species in Pityotrichus.

== Species ==
These three species belong to the genus Pityotrichus:

- Pityotrichus barbatus Blackman, 1928
- Pityotrichus hesperius Bright, 1971
- Pityotrichus turkmenicus Mandelshtam & Petrov, 2006
