= Thysanoes =

Scientific classification
- Kingdom: Animalia
- Phylum: Arthropoda
- Class: Insecta
- Order: Coleoptera
- Suborder: Polyphaga
- Infraorder: Cucujiformia
- Family: Curculionidae
- Subfamily: Scolytinae
- Genus: Thysanoes; LeConte, 1876

Genus of beetles

Thysanoes is a genus of typical bark beetles in the family Curculionidae. There are about 7 described species in Thysanoes.

== Species ==
- Thysanoes berbericolens Wood, 1971
- Thysanoes berschemiae Blackman, 1920
- Thysanoes fimbricornis LeConte, 1876
- Thysanoes lobdelli Blackman, 1920
- Thysanoes pallens Wood, 1956
- Thysanoes texanus Blackman, 1943
- Thysanoes xylophagus Blackman, 1928
