= Pseudothysanoes =

Scientific classification
- Domain: Eukaryota
- Kingdom: Animalia
- Phylum: Arthropoda
- Class: Insecta
- Order: Coleoptera
- Suborder: Polyphaga
- Infraorder: Cucujiformia
- Family: Curculionidae
- Tribe: Scolytini
- Genus: Pseudothysanoes; Blackman, 1920

Genus of beetles

Pseudothysanoes is a genus of typical bark beetles in the family Curculionidae. There are more than 100 described species in Pseudothysanoes.

== See also ==
- List of Pseudothysanoes species
