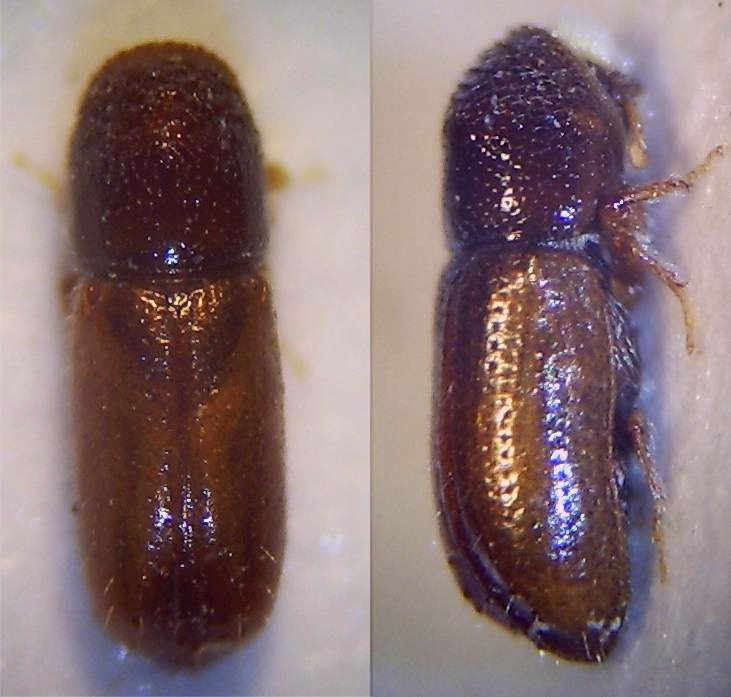

Scientific classification
- Kingdom: Animalia
- Phylum: Arthropoda
- Clade: Pancrustacea
- Class: Insecta
- Order: Coleoptera
- Suborder: Polyphaga
- Infraorder: Cucujiformia
- Superfamily: Curculionoidea
- Family: Curculionidae
- Subfamily: Scolytinae
- Tribe: Scolytini
- Subtribe: Pityophthorina
- Genus: Pityophthorus; Eichhoff, 1864

Diversity
- About 554 species

= Pityophthorus =

Genus of beetles

Pityophthorus is a genus of typical bark beetles in the family Curculionidae. As of mid-2026, there are 554 recognized species in Pityophthorus.

== See also ==
- List of Pityophthorus species
