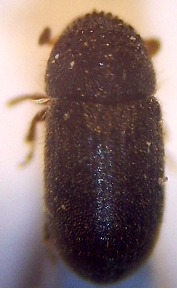
- Cryphalus abietis

Scientific classification
- Kingdom: Animalia
- Phylum: Arthropoda
- Clade: Pancrustacea
- Class: Insecta
- Order: Coleoptera
- Suborder: Polyphaga
- Infraorder: Cucujiformia
- Family: Curculionidae
- Subfamily: Scolytinae
- Tribe: Cryphalini; Lindemann, 1876

Genera
- See text

Synonyms
- Eidophelinae (Murayama, 1954); Ernoporinae (Nüsslin, 1911); Trypophloeinae (Nüsslin, 1911)

= Cryphalini =

Tribe of beetles

Cryphalini is a tribe of true weevils in the subfamily Scolytinae, the bark beetles.

== Genera ==
Acorthylus – Allernoporus – Coriacephilus – Cosmoderes – Cryphalogenes – Cryphalus – Cryptocarenus – Eidophelus – Ernocladius – Ernoporicus – Ernoporus – Hemicryphalus – Hypocryphalus – Hypothenemus – Margadillius – Neocryphus – Periocryphalus – Procryphalus – Ptilopodius – Scolytogenes – Stegomerus – Stephanopodius – Trischidias – Trypophloeus
