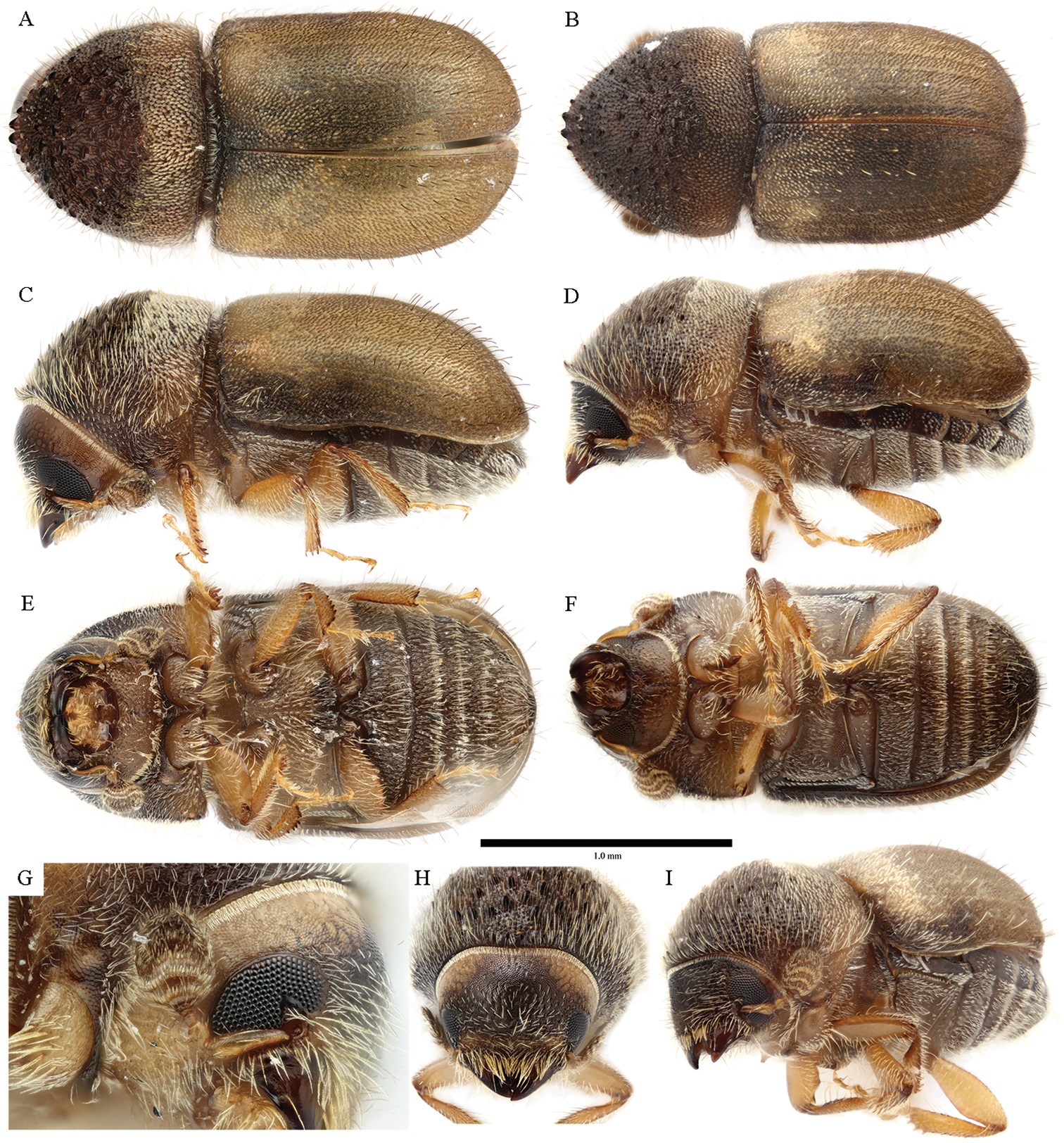
- Cryphalus dilutus A, C, E, G, H female, B, D, F, I male

Scientific classification
- Domain: Eukaryota
- Kingdom: Animalia
- Phylum: Arthropoda
- Class: Insecta
- Order: Coleoptera
- Suborder: Polyphaga
- Infraorder: Cucujiformia
- Family: Curculionidae
- Genus: Cryphalus
- Species: C. dilutus

Binomial name
- Cryphalus dilutus Eichhoff, 1878

Synonyms
- Hypocryphalus dilutus

= Cryphalus dilutus =

Species of beetle

Cryphalus dilutus, the spurred bark beetle, is a tropical and subtropical bark beetle which attacks fig (Ficus carica) and mango trees (Mangifera indica) causing dieback. It belongs to the family Curculionidae, subfamily Scolytinae.

== Distribution ==
C. dilutus is widely distributed in tropical and subtropical regions. Most distribution records are from southern Asia, the Near East and Mexico. It was originally described from Myanmar (type locality) and other locations cited in taxonomic articles include southern China, Malta, southern Italy, Tunisia, United Arab Emirates, Oman, India, Pakistan, Bangladesh and Mexico. In southern Italy it was first reported in 2014 and 2015 and is regarded there as an invasive pest of fig and mango trees. In Mexico it is also listed as 'introduced'. For a complete list of distribution records see the "Bark and Ambrosia Beetles of North and Central America".

== Biology ==
The adult of C. dilutus is around 2 mm long and about 1 mm wide. Among other features it has a spine on the mesofemur which is unique in the subfamily Scolytinae. Beetles infesting mango trees are sometimes confused with Cryphalus mangiferae Stebbing, 1914, the mango bark beetle, which also infests mango trees and has a similar distribution compared to C. dilutus. However, that species does not attack fig trees, is not found in southern Europe and has different morphological features.

The females of C. dilutus lay eggs under the bark of fig and mango trees, where the larvae develop with the help of symbiotic fungi. Apart from several species of Ficus and mango, no other host plants are known. Several plant-pathogenic fungi are associated with the adults like Ceratocystis ficicola which is causing the destructive fig wilt disease in fig trees. In Italy, the damage to fig trees has been described as 'rapid fig tree dieback' and attacked mango trees suffered from serious trunk damage and wilting.
