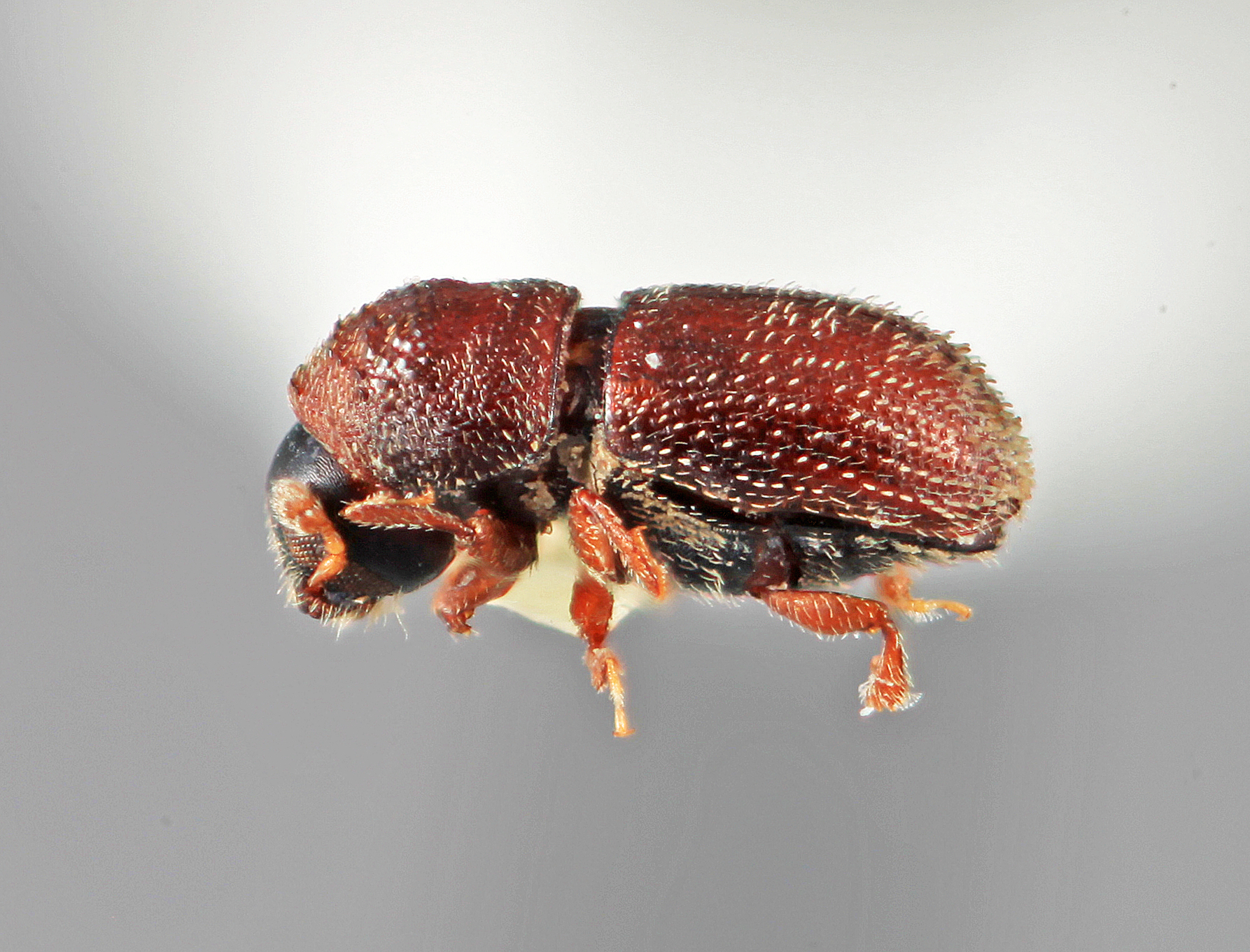
- Holotype

Scientific classification
- Kingdom: Animalia
- Phylum: Arthropoda
- Class: Insecta
- Order: Coleoptera
- Suborder: Polyphaga
- Infraorder: Cucujiformia
- Family: Curculionidae
- Genus: Cryphalogenes
- Species: C. euphorbiae

Binomial name
- Cryphalogenes euphorbiae Wood, 1980

= Cryphalogenes euphorbiae =

Species of beetle

Cryphalogenes euphorbiae is a species of weevil. It is found in Sri Lanka.

== Description ==
Similar to much smaller species Cryphalogenes exiguus. Length of the male is about 1.2 to 1.4 mm.
