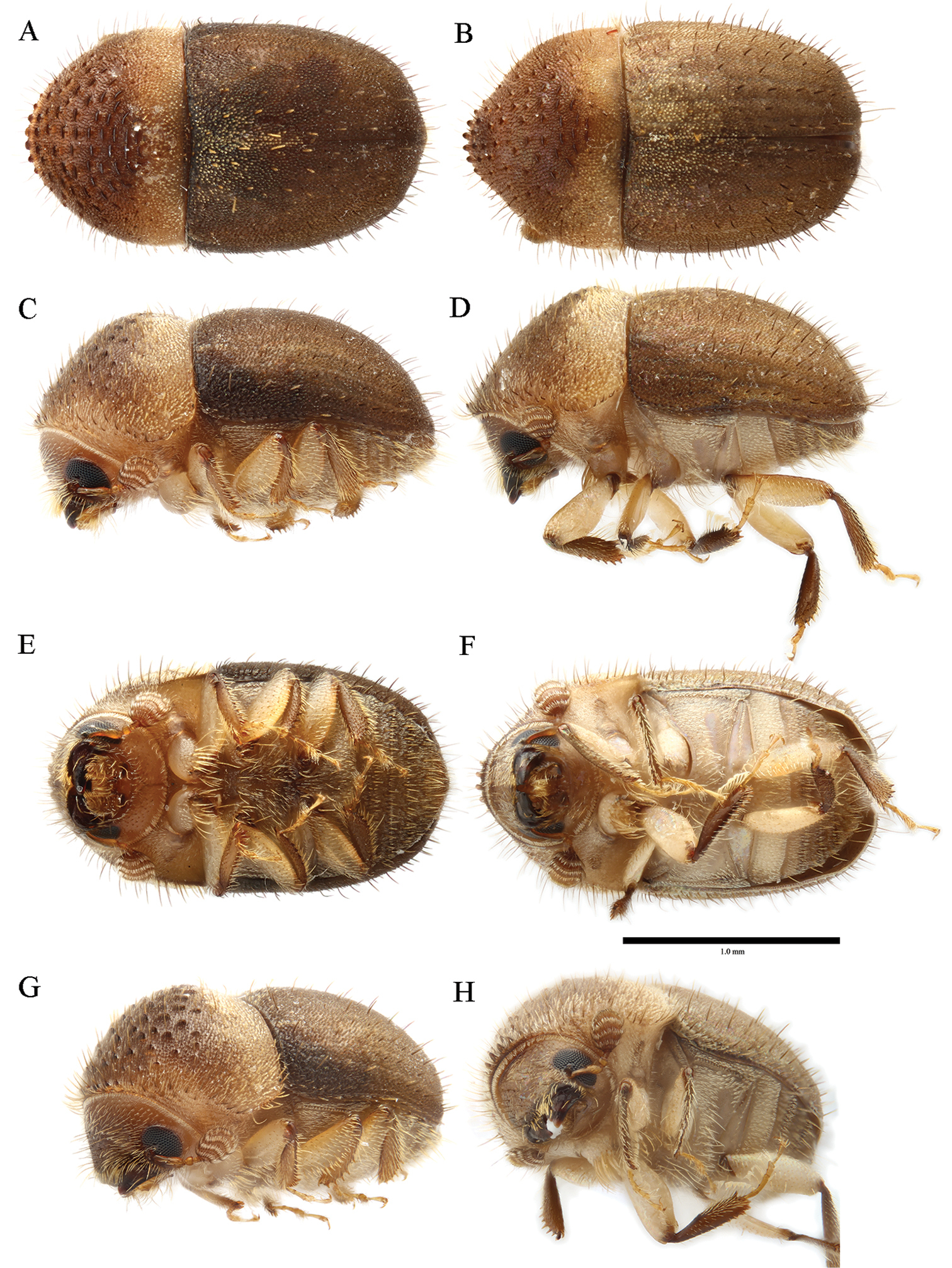
- Cryphalus dorsalis - A, C, E, G female - B, D, F, H male

Scientific classification
- Kingdom: Animalia
- Phylum: Arthropoda
- Clade: Pancrustacea
- Class: Insecta
- Order: Coleoptera
- Suborder: Polyphaga
- Infraorder: Cucujiformia
- Family: Curculionidae
- Genus: Cryphalus
- Species: C. dorsalis

Binomial name
- Cryphalus dorsalis (Motschulsky, 1866)

Synonyms
- Hypoborus dorsalis Motschulsky, 1866; Cryphalus indicus Eichhoff, 1878

= Cryphalus dorsalis =

Species of beetle

Cryphalus dorsalis is a small bark beetle (subfamily Scolytinae, family Curculionidae), 1.60–1.90 mm long and found in southern parts of Asia with a distribution range from India in the west to Java (Indonesia), the Philippines and southern China in the east. Little information is available on its biology, even on its host plants. In a detailed re-description of the species based on light trap material and specimens without host plant records, Johnson et al. (2020) mentioned that fir (Abies) has been cited as a host plant in one publication which recorded it from Hainan Island (China) where Abies does not grow.

== Description ==
Cryphalus dorsalis can be identified by the combination of its size, a transverse ridge on the male frons, the arrangement of scales and spatula-shaped setae, as well as the smooth elytra. Compared to many other species of the genus Cryphalus, the adults are rather compact, only 1.75x longer than wide. The dorsal colour is brownish with some parts lighter, the ventral colour is lighter brown. The femora of the legs are pale, but the tibia are dark brown. In profile, the anterior part of the pronotum is slightly curved, not strongly rounded or domed as in some species of this genus. The pronotum is somewhat triangular in profile and there are around 50 tiny humps (also called 'asperitites') on the anterior part, the 'pronotal disc'.

The elytra are 1.6 times longer than the pronotum. They have longitudinal stripes, visible as rows of punctures. However, unlike in many other species of Cryphalus, these are weakly developed and the elytra have a smooth appearance, devoid of the longitudinal grooves and pits found in other Cryphalus species. Females have a size of 1.60–1.90 mm. Males are slightly smaller than females. The frons (frontal part of the head) of the male has a straight transverse ridge (carina).

== Taxonomy ==
Cryphalus dorsalis has been originally described from India by Motschulsky as Hypoborus dorsalis. After examining the type series, it was transferred to the genus Cryphalus by Wood who noted that it is identical "or very near" to Cryphalus indicus. C. indicus, in turn, was assigned as a synonym of Cryphalus dorsalis by Johnson (2020).

This indirect assignment of Hypoborus dorsalis as a synonym of Cryphalus dorsalis by Wood and Johnson has caused some confusion among authors and the species is listed as Cryphalus dorsalis Wood, 1969 in some cases. Further, Hypoborus dorsalis Motschulsky, 1866 may be still listed as a separate species in some databases and by some authors. In addition, it is also listed as a synonym of Hypoborus ficus by some authors. For example, as of April 2024 the Global Biodiversity Information Facility (GBIF) lists it 3 times: a) as a separate species, b) as a synonym of Hypoborus ficus, and c) as Cryphalus dorsalis Wood, 1969.
