= Cryphalus ruficollis =

Scientific classification
- Domain: Eukaryota
- Kingdom: Animalia
- Phylum: Arthropoda
- Class: Insecta
- Order: Coleoptera
- Suborder: Polyphaga
- Infraorder: Cucujiformia
- Family: Curculionidae
- Genus: Cryphalus
- Species: C. ruficollis

Binomial name
- Cryphalus ruficollis Hopkins, 1915

Species of beetle

Cryphalus ruficollis is a species of bark beetle in the family Curculionidae that lives in North America.
