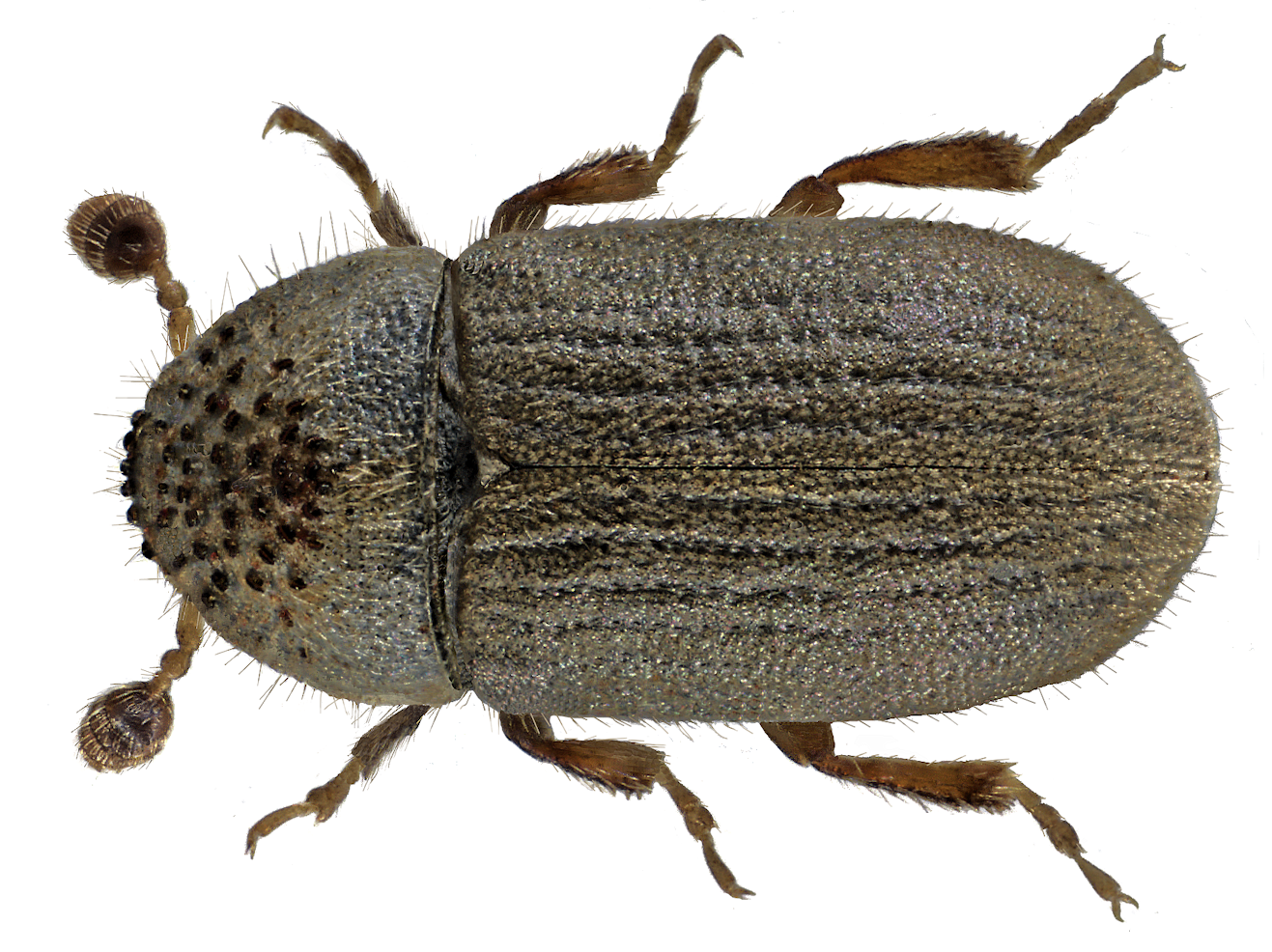
- Cryphalus abietis

Scientific classification
- Kingdom: Animalia
- Phylum: Arthropoda
- Class: Insecta
- Order: Coleoptera
- Suborder: Polyphaga
- Infraorder: Cucujiformia
- Family: Curculionidae
- Tribe: Cryphalini
- Subtribe: Cryphalina
- Genus: Cryphalus; W.F. Erichson, 1836

Synonyms
- Hypocryphalus Hopkins, 1915

= Cryphalus =

Genus of beetles

Cryphalus is a large genus of tiny bark beetles, subfamily Scolytinae, tribe Cryphalini in the family Curculionidae. The genus is widely distributed. The species feed and breed under the inner bark of trees. They infest mainly recently dead, dying or stressed trees. Some species are regarded as invasive pests, harmful to agriculture or forestry.

== Taxonomy ==
The genus Cryphalus can be recognized by a combination of morphological characters mainly on the eyes, the antennae and tarsi. The genus has been revised in 2020 by Johnson et al. and currently includes 253 species. During that revision several genera have been combined with the genus Cryphalus like the genus Hypocryphalus which turned out to be polyphyletic and intermixed with Cryphalus. See that revision for a complete list of synonyms for the genus Cryphalus.

Type species: Bostrichus asperatus Gyllenhal, 1813

== Distribution ==
The genus Cryphalus has a world-wide distribution, but the species found in Central and South America are regarded as introduced. The large majority of species have been recorded in eastern Asia and the Pacific. In a checklist published in 2020, 140 species were listed in eastern Asia (including the Philippines), 90 in the Pacific and Australia (including New Guinea), 23 in Africa, 21 in western Asia, 6 each in Europe and North/Central America, and 2 in South America (some species were reported from more than one region).

== Description ==
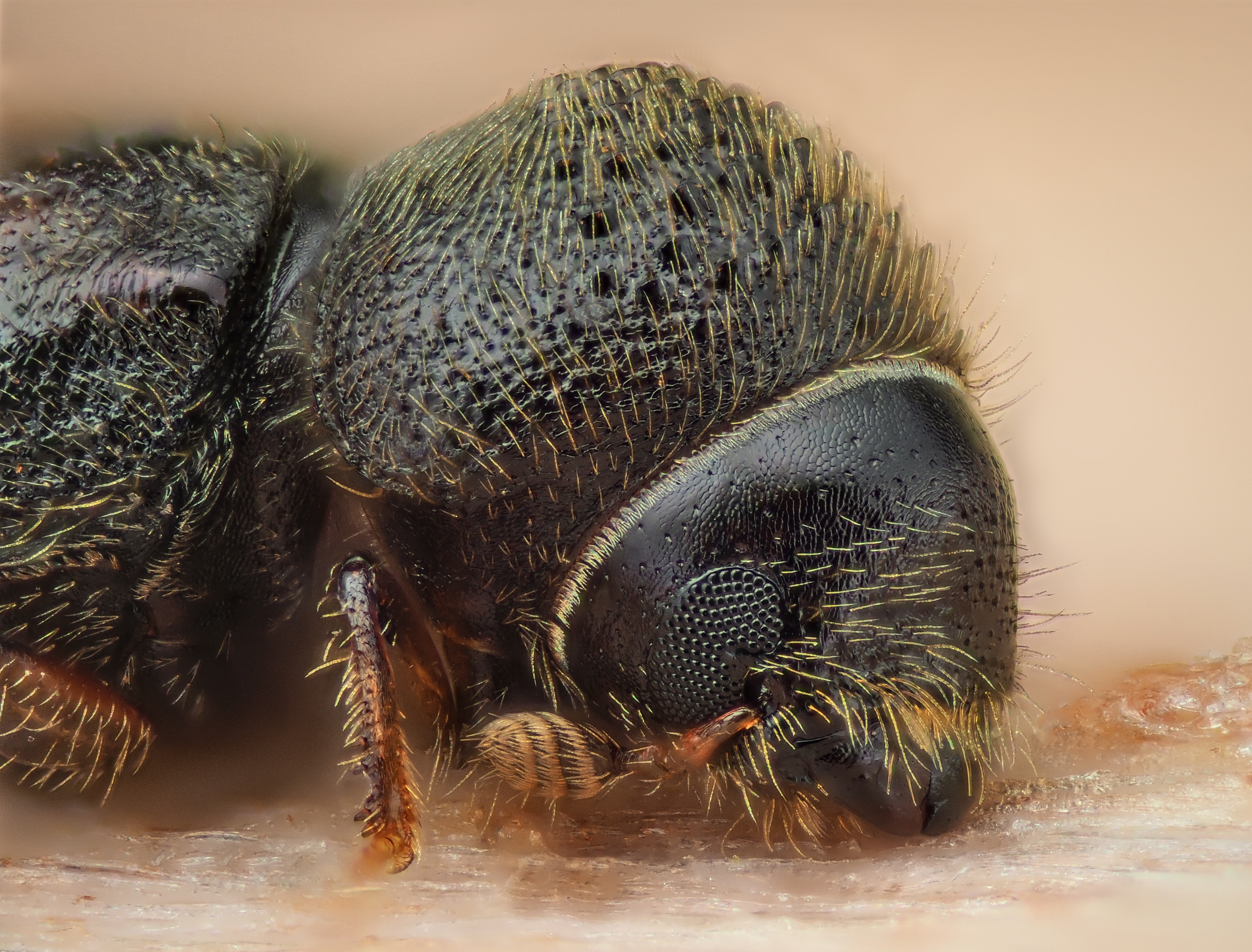
anterior part of Cryphalus piceae

The adult beetles are tiny, dark brown and range in size from 0.8 to 3 mm. However, adults smaller than 1.2 mm and larger than 2.5 mm are rare. In dorsal view, the head is often hidden under the pronotum, which is large, domed, and with the anterior parts covered by tubercles. Many parts of the cuticle bear hair-like setae. See Wikimedia Commons for additional illustrations.

== Biology ==
Species of Cryphalus either infest tree branches or the stems of young host trees, where they colonize the phloem tissue under the bark, feeding on the phloem and cambium. Weakened or stressed host trees are usually preferred. Most species are either monophagous or oligophagous. In Europe, the host trees of most species are conifers. However, in other regions, angiosperms are also commonly infested.

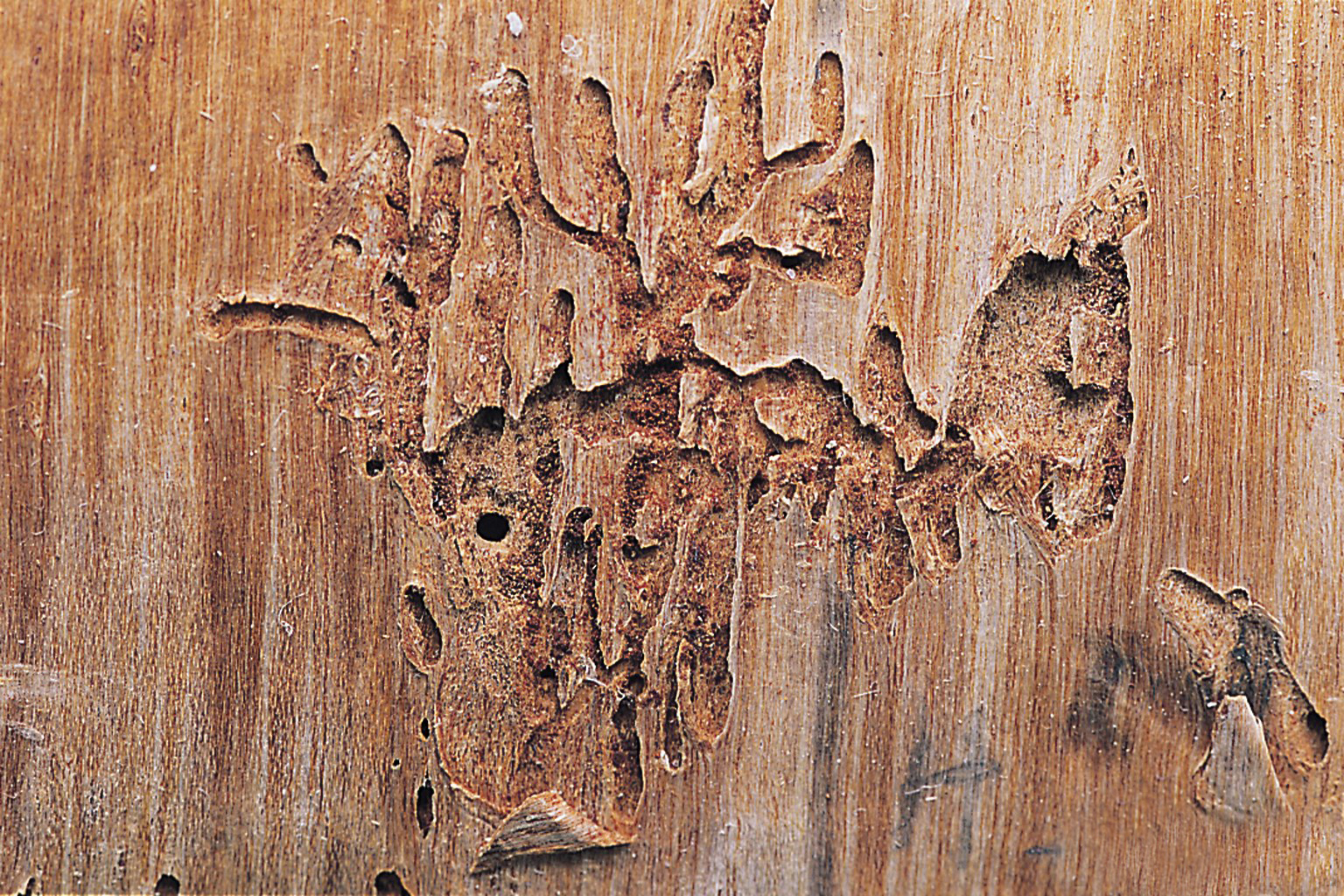
galleries formed by Cryphalus piceae

A typical life cycle has been described for Cryphalus piceae which mainly infests fir trees or spruce in central and southern Europe. The adult beetles hibernate in short tunnels formed in healthy trees. They emerge in spring, mate and a monogamous pair forms a nuptial chamber under the bark of weakened or freshly dead branches, where the female lays 5–26 eggs. The larvae construct galleries radiating from the nuptial chamber, where the larvae develop and pupate. The adults emerge starting in April to May. Often there is a second generation in the summer.

== Damage and disease transmission ==
Most species of Cryphalus cause only minor damage to their host trees. However, several species are regarded as pests, causing decline of trees like fig (Ficus carica), mango (Mangifera indica) or loquat (Eriobotrya japonica).

Bark beetles are often vectors of plant diseases and have special structures for carrying symbiotic fungi called mycangia. Several species of Cryphalus have been associated with plant pathogenic fungi and are regarded or suspected as being vectors of these pathogens.

== Species ==
The genus Cryphalus includes more than 250 species. The species recorded in more than one countries are listed here, based mainly on the 2020 checklist:

- Cryphalus abbreviatus Schedl, 1943
- Cryphalus abietis (Ratzeburg, 1837)
- Cryphalus bellus Schedl, 1957
- Cryphalus bicolor (Browne, 1984)
- Cryphalus borneensis Schedl, 1943
- Cryphalus capucinus Schedl, 1938
- Cryphalus carpini Berger, 1917
- Cryphalus confusus (Hopkins, 1915)
- Cryphalus constrictus Schedl, 1942
- Cryphalus corpulentus (Schedl, 1942)
- Cryphalus dilutus Eichhoff, 1878
- Cryphalus dipterocarpi Wood, 1989
- Cryphalus discretus Eichhoff, 1878
- Cryphalus dorsalis (Motschulsky, 1866)
- Cryphalus elongatus Schedl, 1962
- Cryphalus exiguus Blandford, 1894
- Cryphalus fulmineus Wood, 1989
- Cryphalus fulvus Niisima, 1908
- Cryphalus furukawai Murayama, 1934
- Cryphalus intermedius Ferrari, 1867
- Cryphalus interponens (Schedl, 1953)
- Cryphalus jeholensis Murayama, 1939
- Cryphalus laricis Niisima, 1909
- Cryphalus latus Eggers, 1929
- Cryphalus longipilis (Browne, 1981)
- Cryphalus longipilus Schedl, 1943
- Cryphalus malayensis (Schedl, 1942)
- Cryphalus malus Niisima, 1909
- Cryphalus mandschuricus Eggers, 1929
- Cryphalus mangiferae Stebbing, 1914
- Cryphalus minimus Eggers, 1927
- Cryphalus mollis Schedl, 1955
- Cryphalus nigricans Schedl, 1943
- Cryphalus numidicus Eichhoff, 1878
- Cryphalus paganus Eichhoff, 1878
- Cryphalus palawanus Schedl, 1942
- Cryphalus pallidus Eichhoff, 1872
- Cryphalus piceae (Ratzeburg, 1837)
- Cryphalus piceus Eggers, 1926
- Cryphalus pruni Eggers, 1929
- Cryphalus pubescens Hopkins, 1915
- Cryphalus redikorzevi Berger, 1917
- Cryphalus rhusii Niisima, 1909
- Cryphalus ruficollis Hopkins, 1915
- Cryphalus saltuarius Weise, 1891
- Cryphalus samoensis Beeson, 1929
- Cryphalus scopiger Berger, 1917
- Cryphalus sichotensis Kurenzov, 1941
- Cryphalus strigilatus Wichmann, 1914
- Cryphalus strohmeyeri Stebbing, 1914
- Cryphalus submuricatus Eichhoff, 1878
- Cryphalus substriatus Schedl, 1942
- Cryphalus sundaensis Schedl, 1942
- Cryphalus sylvicola (Perkins, 1900)
- Cryphalus tenuis Schedl, 1942
- Cryphalus trypanoides Beeson, 1935
- Cryphalus trypanus Sampson, 1914
- Cryphalus viburni Stark, 1936
- Cryphalus walkeri (Blandford, 1896)
- Cryphalus wapleri Eichhoff, 1872
