= Cosmoderes elegans =

Scientific classification
- Kingdom: Animalia
- Phylum: Arthropoda
- Class: Insecta
- Order: Coleoptera
- Suborder: Polyphaga
- Infraorder: Cucujiformia
- Family: Curculionidae
- Genus: Cosmoderes
- Species: C. elegans

Binomial name
- Cosmoderes elegans Schedl, 1975f

Species of beetle

Cosmoderes elegans is a species of true weevils in the subfamily Scolytinae. It is found in New Guinea.
