= Cosmoderes =

Scientific classification
- Kingdom: Animalia
- Phylum: Arthropoda
- Class: Insecta
- Order: Coleoptera
- Suborder: Polyphaga
- Infraorder: Cucujiformia
- Family: Curculionidae
- Tribe: Cryphalini
- Genus: Cosmoderes; Eichhoff, 1878

Species
- Several, including: Cosmoderes elegans

Genus of beetles

Cosmoderes is a genus of true weevils in the subfamily Scolytinae.
