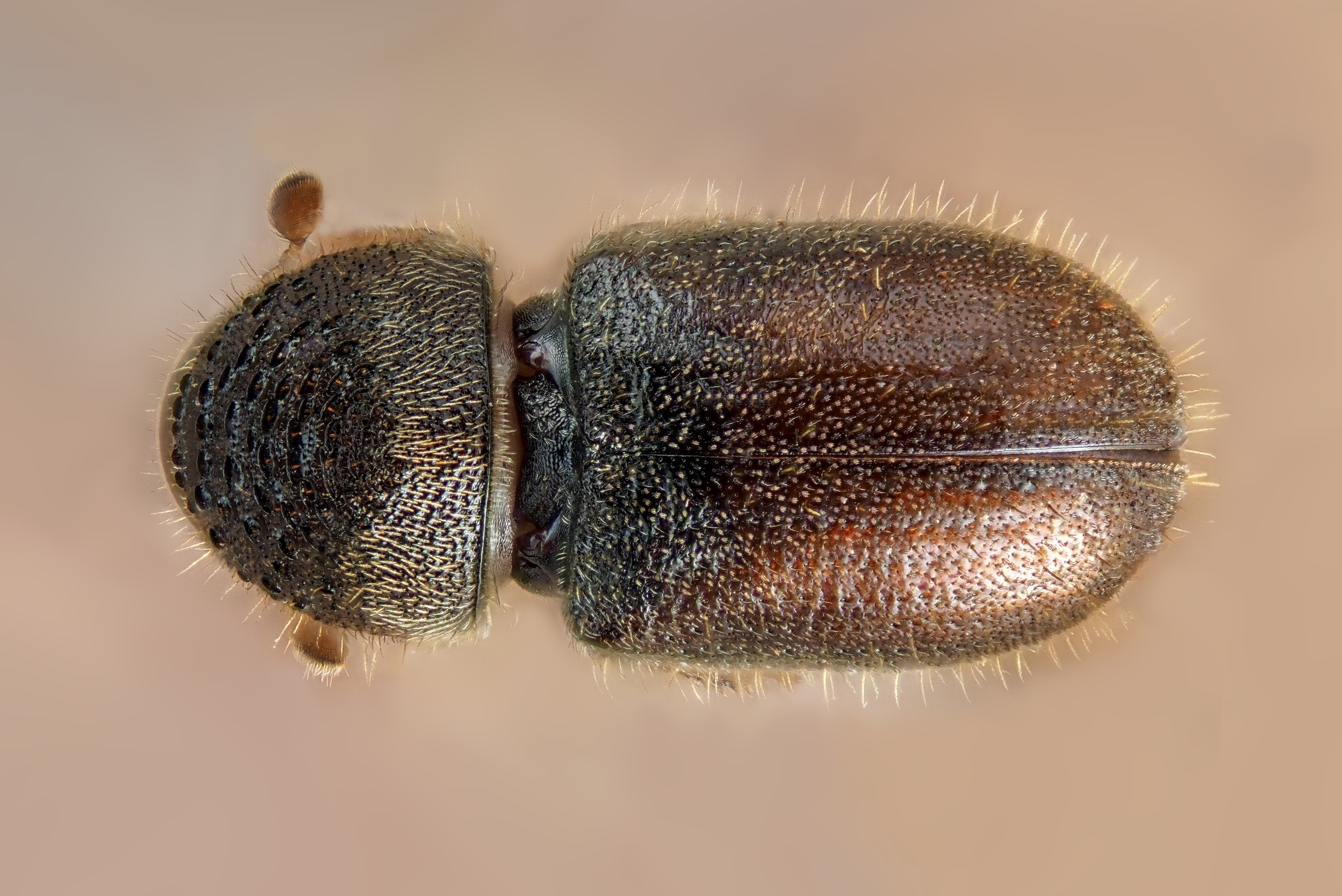
- Dorsal view of Cryphalus piceae

Scientific classification
- Domain: Eukaryota
- Kingdom: Animalia
- Phylum: Arthropoda
- Class: Insecta
- Order: Coleoptera
- Suborder: Polyphaga
- Infraorder: Cucujiformia
- Family: Curculionidae
- Genus: Cryphalus
- Species: C. piceae

Binomial name
- Cryphalus piceae (Ratzeburg, 1837)

= Cryphalus piceae =

Species of beetle

Cryphalus piceae, the small fir bark beetle, is a tiny bark beetle, about 1.7 mm long that is found in central and southern Europe. It infests mainly fir (Abies) and spruce trees (Picea) and occasionally can cause damage to branches and young trees, including tree death.

== Description ==
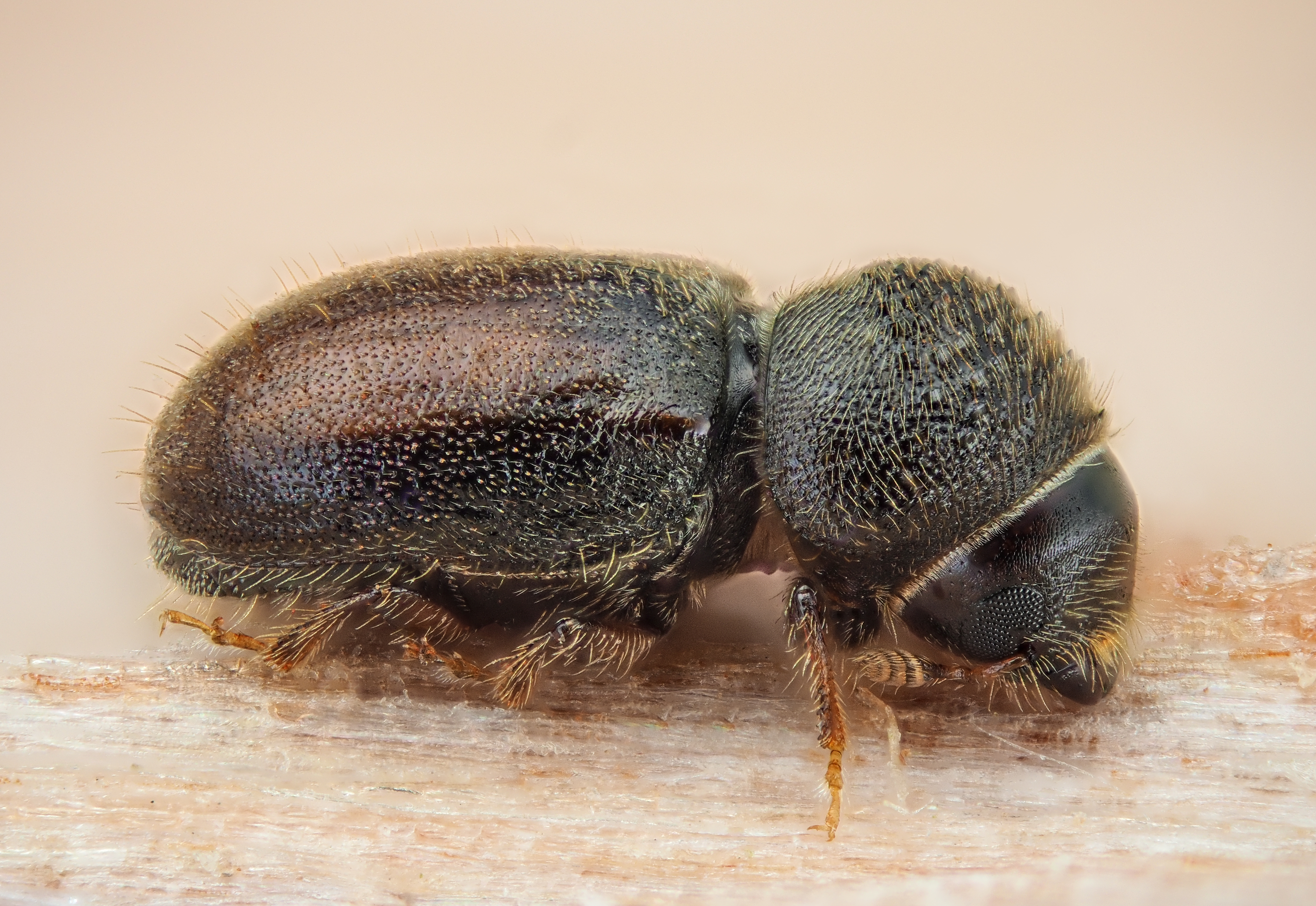
side view of Cryphalus piceae

The adult beetle is between 1.5 and 1.9 mm long (average 1.7 mm) and 2.2x longer than wide. It can be distinguished from similar species by a combination of morphological characters on the pronotum, elytra and the male aedeagus.

== Distribution ==
Cryphalus piceae is found in most parts of central and southern Europe where fir and spruce trees are growing, as well as in parts of western Asia. There are also records from North Africa and eastern Asia. However, C. piceae has been confused with other similar species like Cryphalus numidicus which is known to occur in North Africa and Asia, therefore, those records need confirmation.

== Biology ==
The host trees of C. piceae are mainly fir (Abies) and spruce (Picea) trees and these are most attractive to the adult beetles. Fir species like Abies alba and Abies procera are most seriously affected, but others Abies species and Picea species are also attacked. Occasionally, other conifers, including larch, pines and Douglas fir, may become infested.

Cryphalus piceae attacks mainly thin branches of its host trees, these are often stressed or recently dead trees, or freshly broken off branches. Healthy trees are usually only attacked when populations have reached a high density, for example during the second generation. However, the adults typically hibernate in healthy trees in short tunnels. Overwintering as larvae or pupae has been also reported.

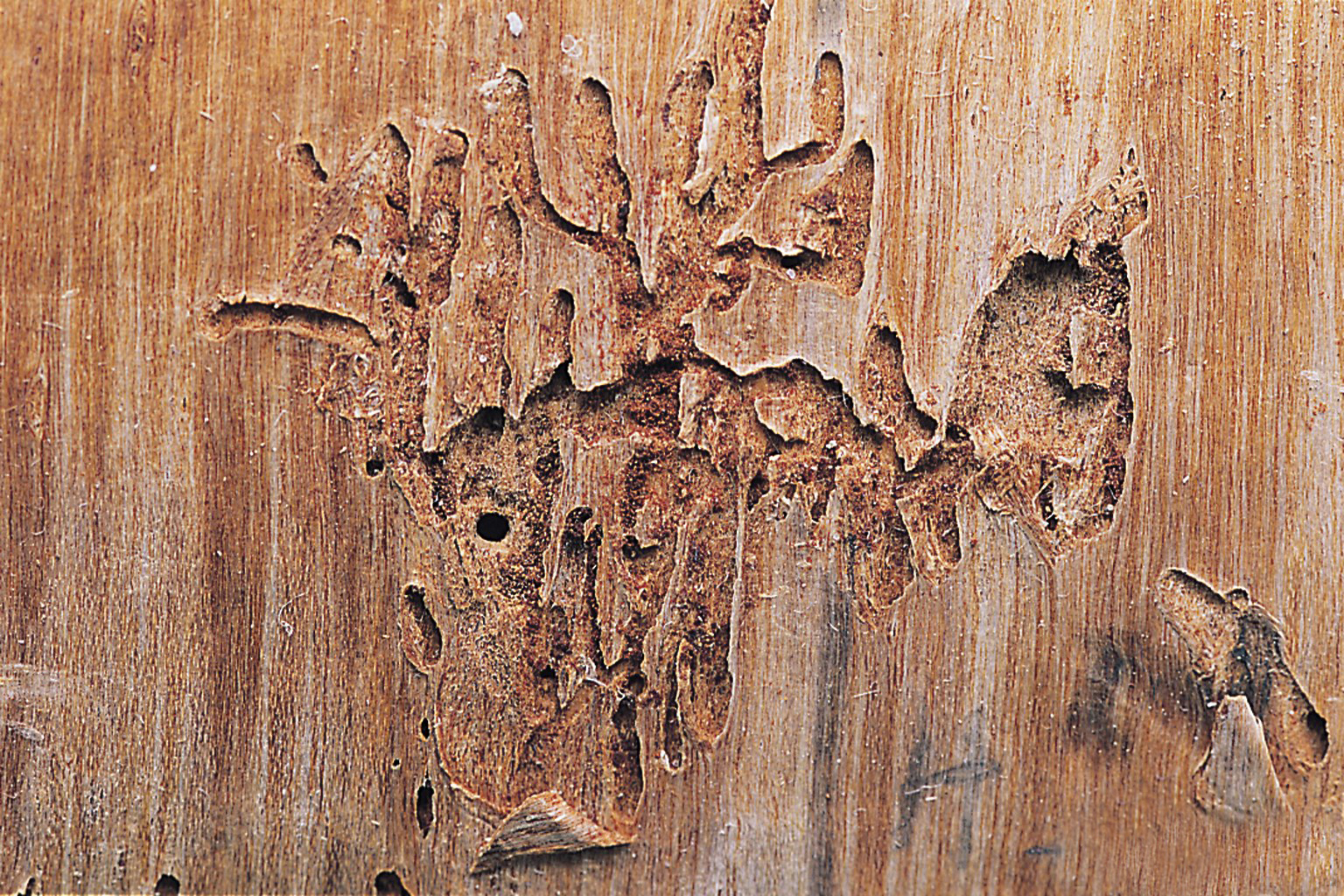
larval galleries of Cryphalus piceae

In the beginning of spring, the adults emerge from hibernation, aggregate, mate and each pair constructs a nuptial chamber under the bark of a host tree. Females lay 5–26 eggs and the emerging larvae construct galleries radiating from the nuptial chamber, where they develop and pupate. The adults of the new generation emerge starting in April to May. Often there is a second generation in the summer, especially in southern parts of Europe.

== Damage ==
While many infestations by C. piceae result in only insignificant damage, outbreaks causing economic damage have been reported occasionally. On Abies alba outbreaks occurred in northern Italy around 1990 and in Denmark on Abies procera starting in 2012. During such outbreaks healthy trees are attacked and infestations can lead to the death of young trees. In addition to direct damage by the bark beetle, C. piceae can be associated with various plant pathogenic fungi and may transmit some of these.

== See also ==
Cryphalus piceae in the German Wikipedia
