= Trischidias exigua =

Scientific classification
- Kingdom: Animalia
- Phylum: Arthropoda
- Clade: Pancrustacea
- Class: Insecta
- Order: Coleoptera
- Suborder: Polyphaga
- Infraorder: Cucujiformia
- Family: Curculionidae
- Genus: Trischidias
- Species: T. exigua

Binomial name
- Trischidias exigua Wood, 1986

Species of beetle

Trischidias exigua, the trischidias exiguus, is a species of typical bark beetle in the family Curculionidae. It is found in North America.
