= Cryphalus pubescens =

Scientific classification
- Domain: Eukaryota
- Kingdom: Animalia
- Phylum: Arthropoda
- Class: Insecta
- Order: Coleoptera
- Suborder: Polyphaga
- Infraorder: Cucujiformia
- Family: Curculionidae
- Genus: Cryphalus
- Species: C. pubescens

Binomial name
- Cryphalus pubescens Hopkins, 1915

Species of beetle

Cryphalus pubescens is a species of typical bark beetle in the family Curculionidae. It is found in North America.
