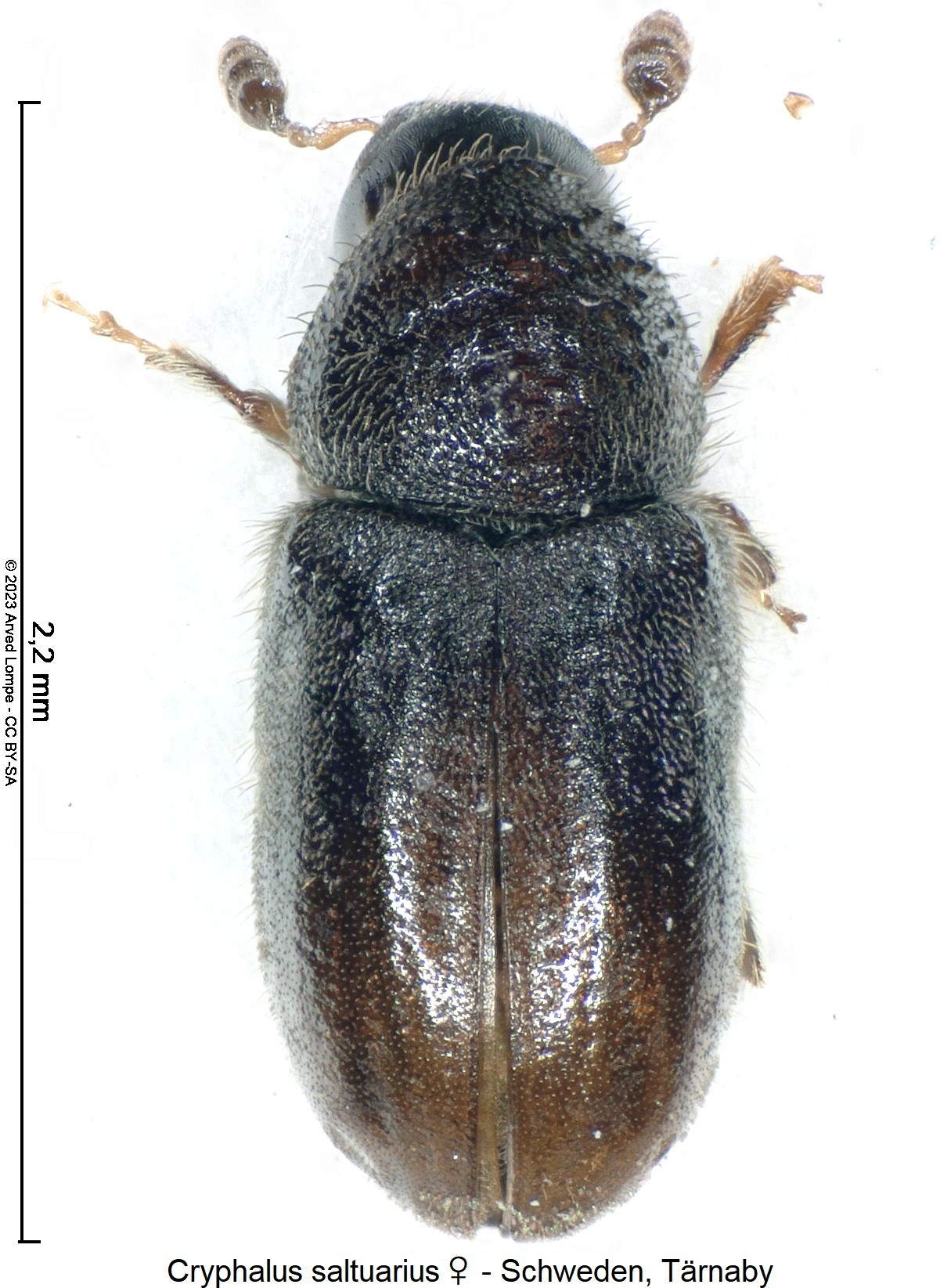
- Dorsal view of Cryphalus saltuarius female from Sweden

Scientific classification
- Domain: Eukaryota
- Kingdom: Animalia
- Phylum: Arthropoda
- Class: Insecta
- Order: Coleoptera
- Suborder: Polyphaga
- Infraorder: Cucujiformia
- Family: Curculionidae
- Genus: Cryphalus
- Species: C. saltuarius

Binomial name
- Cryphalus saltuarius Weise, 1891

Synonyms
- Bostrichus asperatus Gyllenhal, 1813; Cryphalus asperatus (Gyllenhal, 1813); Bostrichus asperatus Ratzeburg, 1837

= Cryphalus saltuarius =

Species of beetle

Cryphalus saltuarius - Cryphalus asperatus is a small bark beetle (subfamily Scolytinae, family Curculionidae), around 1.8 mm long, that infests mainly spruce trees (Picea), less often other conifers. It has been recorded mainly from northern Europe and is occasionally regarded as a secondary pest. However, it attacks primarily weakened and freshly dead branches of its host trees.

== Description ==
The adult beetle is between 1.7 and 2.0 mm long (average 1.8 mm) and 2.3x longer than wide. The colour is dark brown to black. It is characterized by the morphology of its antennae, the pronotum, the elytra and the male aedeagus. Cryphalus saltuarius is similar to Cryphalus abietis and can be confused with that species. However, C. saltuarius is slightly larger and can be separated by its elytra, the pronotum as well as by the shape of the male aedeagus.

== Distribution ==
Cryphalus saltuarius is common in Scandinavia and has been also reported from other parts of Europe. However, it is less often found in central and southern Europe and seems to be mainly confined to mountainous areas there. Further, it has been reported from northern parts of Asia up to China and far eastern Russia.

== Biology ==
The main host tree of Cryphalus saltuarius is Norway spruce (Picea abies) and other Picea species. Other conifers like pine (Pinus) and fir (Abies) are less often used. C. saltuarius prefers to attack weakened trees, infesting small branches with a thin bark. Also, freshly dead branches and young trees can be attacked. Even in northern Europe where it is common, it has been only occasionally reported to cause significant damage, mainly to already weakened host trees.

In Scandinavia, the life cycle of Cryphalus saltuarius extends over two years. The adult beetles disperse during the summer, mate and females lay eggs under the bark. The emerging larvae feed under the bark on the phloem and cambium, hibernate during the winter and complete their development during the coming year. The newly developed adult beetles then hibernate during the second winter and emerge the following summer.

== Taxonomy ==
This species has a complicated taxonomical history caused by a confusion between 2 very similar species, Cryphalus abietis (Ratzeburg, 1837) and Cryphalus saltuarius Weise, 1891. Only in 2023 did Justensen et al. definitely establish that both species are clearly different, using morphological features as well as DNA comparison.

Cryphalus saltuarius was first described by Gyllenhal in 1813 as Bostrichus asperatus. In 1837, Ratzeburg described a very similar species as Bostrichus abietis and included a description of the differences to Gyllenhal's Bostrichus asperatus. Later, Ratzeburg's description of these differences, as well as the specimens he used for his comparison, became the basis for naming a new species which was called Cryphalus saltuarius by Weise in 1891. The reasons for this new name are not clear, but were possibly caused by a confusion about which specimens Gyllenhal's description was based on. While Gyllenhal's name and description was largely forgotten for many years, Ratzeburg's description (comparison) and the name Cryphalus saltuarius persisted. For example, in a standard textbook on German beetles, Reitter in 1916 included five species under the genus Cryphalus, C. picea, C. saltuarius, C. abietis, C. intermedius and C. jalappae, together with a key describing the differences between them. C. asperatus Gyllenhal was not included in his key, but was mentioned as being different from Ratzeburg's description of asperatus.

In 1972, Wood compared the genus Cryphalus with other closely related genera and in the process found the specimens on which Gyllenhal's description of Bostrichus asperatus was based, 5 in Uppsala, Sweden and 3 in Berlin. Four of the Uppsala specimens and all three specimens in Berlin are now regarded as belonging to the same species and the 3 specimens in Berlin were apparently those examined by Ratzeburg and on which the name C. saltuarius was based. Therefore, Cryphalus asperatus (Gyllenhal, 1813) and Cryphalus saltuarius Weise 1891 are synonyms and refer to the same species. Although Cryphalus asperatus (Gyllenhal, 1813) is the older name (and should have priority), Justesen et al. have proposed to use Cryphalus saltuarius instead of C. asperatus because C. saltuarius has been widely used for more than 100 years, and is still in use today. This proposal is currently under consideration by the International Commission on Zoological Nomenclature.

In his study in 1972, Wood caused additional confusion by stating that Cryphalus abietis (Ratzeburg, 1837) is a synonym of Cryphalus asperatus (Gyllenhal, 1813). This error was due to both species being very similar and because Ratzeburg's specimens of C. abietis were destroyed during World War II. This had (and still has) the effect that specimens of C. abietis are often misidentified as C. asperatus, while at the same time C. saltuarius is regarded as a species different from C. asperatus, see for example Johnson (2020). Wood did not study the taxonomy of C. saltuarius. Only in December 2023, did a publication by Justensen et al. provide a taxonomically valid separation between C. abietis and C. asperatus. Therefore, in publications before December 2023, the name C. asperatus often needs to be replaced by C. abietis. This applies even to an earlier publication by Justensen et al.

The main differences between both species are:

- Cryphalus saltuarius Weise, 1891 = Cryphalus asperatus (Gyllenhal, 1813): the body length of adult beetles is usually more than 1.75 mm (average around 1.8 mm) and the longitudinal stripes/grooves on the elytra are often not clearly visible.
- Cryphalus abietis (Ratzeburg, 1837): the body length of adult beetles is usually less than 1.75 mm (average around 1.6 mm) and the longitudinal stripes/grooves on the elytra are often clearly visible.

However, for a more reliable identification, other characters like the shape of the elytra, the hair (setae) on the sides of the pronotum, and the shape of the male aedeagus should be examined.

== See also ==
Cryphalus saltuarius in the German Wikipedia
