= Procryphalus =

Scientific classification
- Kingdom: Animalia
- Phylum: Arthropoda
- Class: Insecta
- Order: Coleoptera
- Suborder: Polyphaga
- Infraorder: Cucujiformia
- Family: Curculionidae
- Subtribe: Cryphalina
- Genus: Procryphalus; Hopkins, 1915

Genus of beetles

Procryphalus is a genus of typical bark beetles in the family Curculionidae. There are about seven described species in Procryphalus.

== Species ==
These seven species belong to the genus Procryphalus:

- Procryphalus aceris Hopkins, 1915b
- Procryphalus fraxini Wood & Bright, 1992
- Procryphalus idahoensis Hopkins, 1915b
- Procryphalus mucronatus (LeConte, 1879)
- Procryphalus populi Hopkins, 1915b
- Procryphalus salicis Hopkins, 1915b
- Procryphalus utahensis Hopkins, 1915
