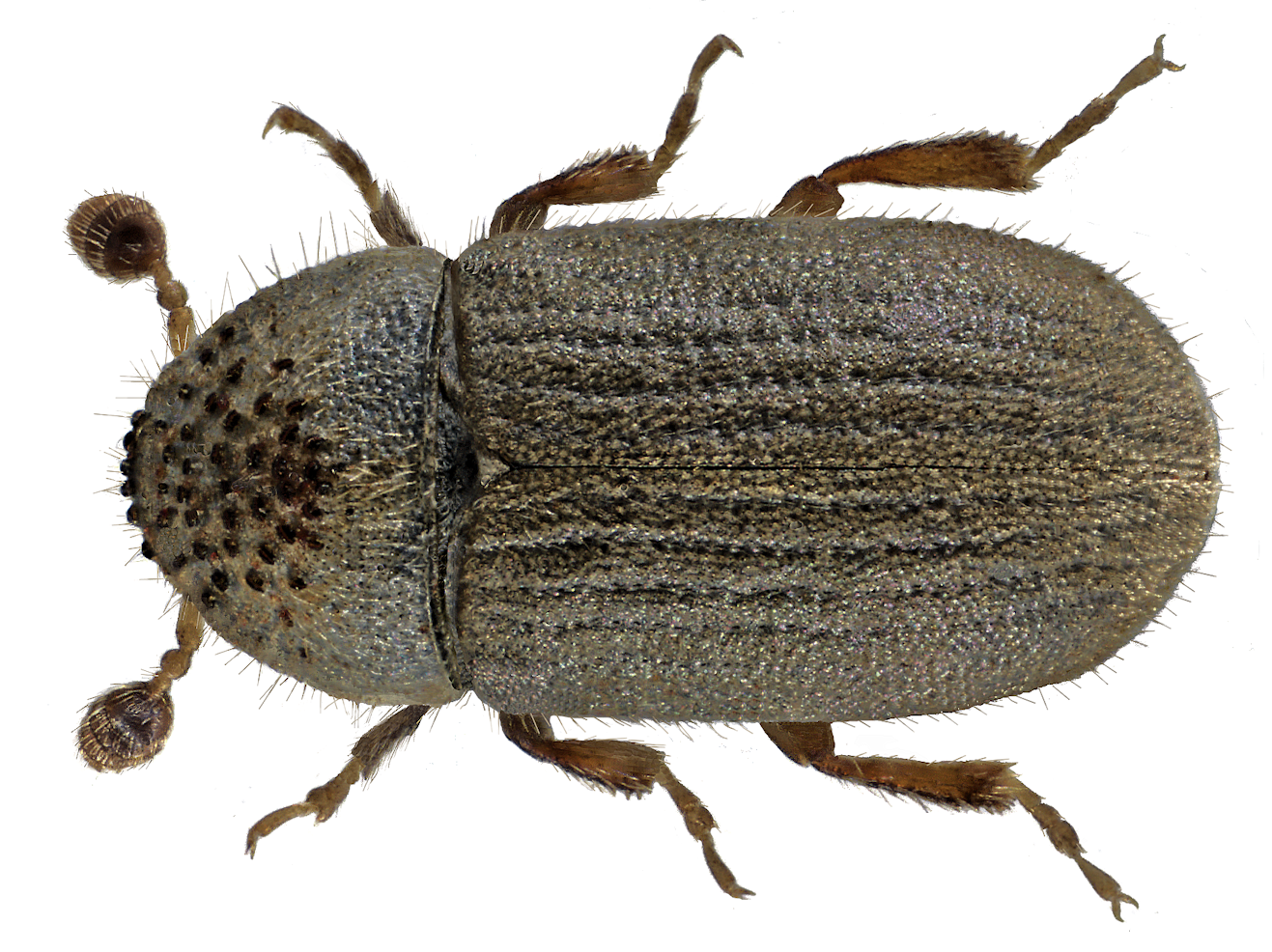

Scientific classification
- Domain: Eukaryota
- Kingdom: Animalia
- Phylum: Arthropoda
- Class: Insecta
- Order: Coleoptera
- Suborder: Polyphaga
- Infraorder: Cucujiformia
- Family: Curculionidae
- Genus: Cryphalus
- Species: C. abietis

Binomial name
- Cryphalus abietis (Ratzeburg, 1837)

Synonyms
- Bostrichus abietis Ratzeburg, 1837

= Cryphalus abietis =

Species of beetle

Cryphalus abietis is a small bark beetle (subfamily Scolytinae, family Curculionidae), around 1.6 mm long, that is widely distributed in Europe. It infests mainly spruce trees (Picea), but also other conifers. Like closely related species, e.g. Cryphalus saltuarius, C. abietis attacks primarily weakened and freshly dead branches of its host trees, and usually does not kill trees.

== Taxonomy ==
While C. abietis is well known in the German literature, its taxonomy has been often confused elsewhere due to its similarity with Cryphalus saltuarius, the destruction of its type specimens during World War II, and a statement by Wood in 1972 that it is a synonym of Cryphalus asperatus. For example, Justesen et al. provided detailed descriptions of C. abietis and its biology under the name "Cryphalus asperatus (Gyllenhal, 1813), syn. Bostrichus abietis Ratzeburg, 1837". However, the authors clarified in a subsequent publication that Cryphalus abietis is a separate species and that Cryphalus asperatus and Cryphalus saltuarius are synonyms. Therefore, in some publications, the name Cryphalus asperatus needs to be replaced by Cryphalus abietis. For more details see the taxonomy section of Cryphalus saltuarius.

== Distribution ==
C. abietis has been reported from nearly all European countries, but is absent from the most northern region of Norway, Sweden, Finland and Russia. In addition, records from northern Africa, western Asia and far eastern Asia are uncertain, due to the presence of very similar species.

== Description ==
The adult beetle of C. abietis is between 1.4 and 1.9 mm long, average 1.6 mm, and 2.3× longer than wide. The color is dark brown to black, but the base of the antennae and parts of the legs are lighter brown. The pronotum is domed, covered with tiny humps (also called 'asperities') on its anterior slope bordering the head. The elytra have longitudinal stripes or grooves with rows of punctures.

Morphologically, C. abietis is very similar to Cryphalus saltuarius, both species may overlap in some features and can be confused. However, C. abietis is on average smaller and the longitudinal grooves on the elytra are usually clearer, deeper and wider. Both species can be reliably separated by the size and shape of the male aedeagus and by their DNA structure.

== Biology ==
Spruce species are the main host plants, in particular, Norway spruce (Picea abies), other Picea species like P. obovata or P. orientalis and some fir species like Abies procera are also important hots. Pine species and some other conifers can be also infested. Preferably, branches with a thin bark are attacked. Freshly dead branches are also infested. Often the attack starts at the axil of a shoot. However, the damage caused by C. abietis seems to be rarely significant. Some reports of young trees being destroyed or weakened by the beetle could have been associated with seedlings being damaged during transport.

C. abietis may overwinter as adult beetle, larva or pupa. According to Ratzeburg it is the earliest bark beetle in Germany and emerges already when there is still snow. Males and females aggregate on suitable branches and after mating construct a large nuptial chamber under the bark, where the female deposits around 20 eggs. The developing larvae construct closely spaced galleries that radiate from this chamber and are 2–4 cm long. There is typically one generation per year in cooler parts of Europe, but two in southern parts (spring to early summer and summer to autumn).
