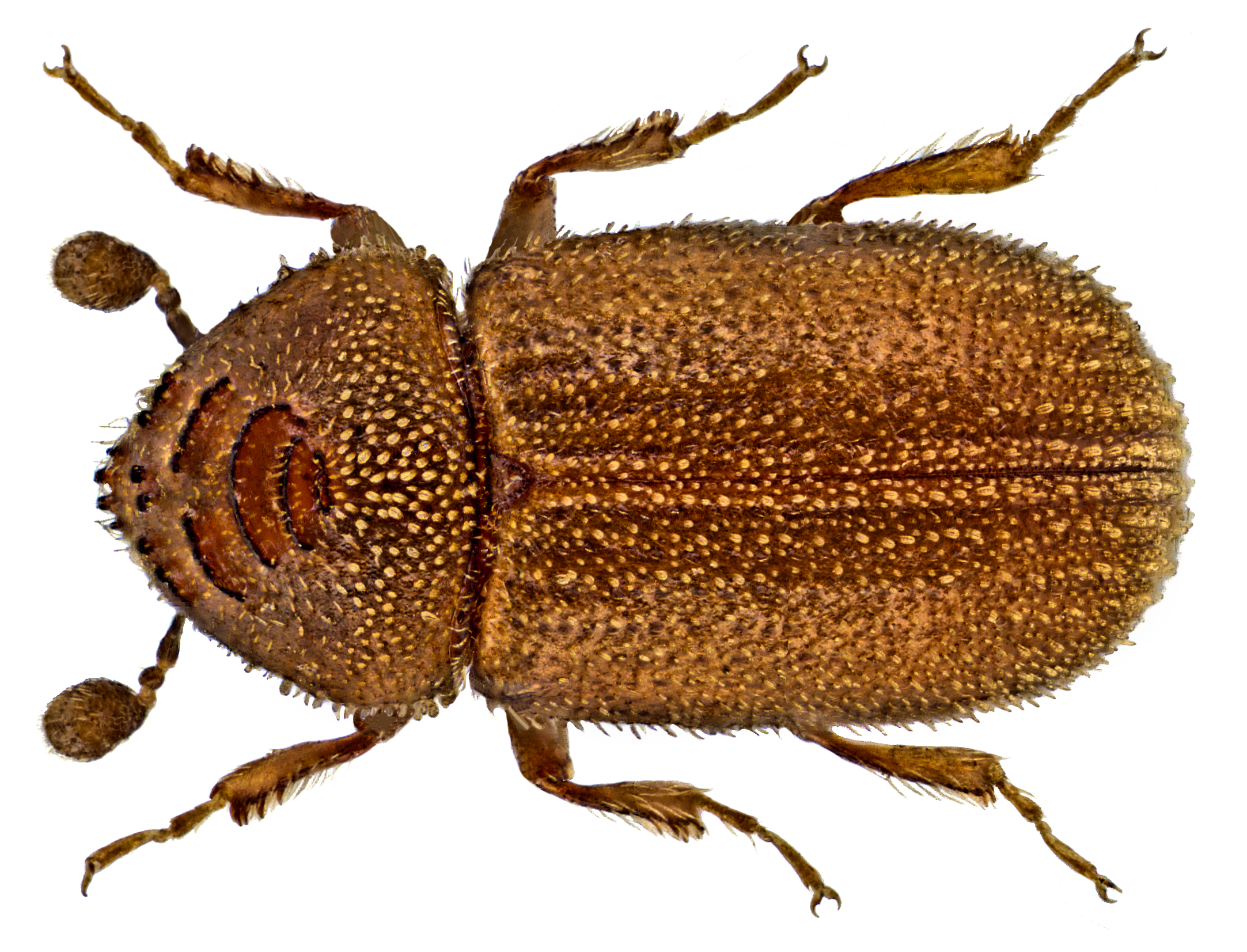
- Ernoporus tiliae

Scientific classification
- Domain: Eukaryota
- Kingdom: Animalia
- Phylum: Arthropoda
- Class: Insecta
- Order: Coleoptera
- Suborder: Polyphaga
- Infraorder: Cucujiformia
- Family: Curculionidae
- Genus: Ernoporus; Thomson, 1859

= Ernoporus =

Genus of beetles

Ernoporus is a genus of beetles belonging to the family Curculionidae.

Synonyms:

- Cryphalops Reitter, 1889
- Stephanorhopalus Hopkins, 1915
- Euptilius Schedl, 1940

Species:

- Ernoporus tiliae
