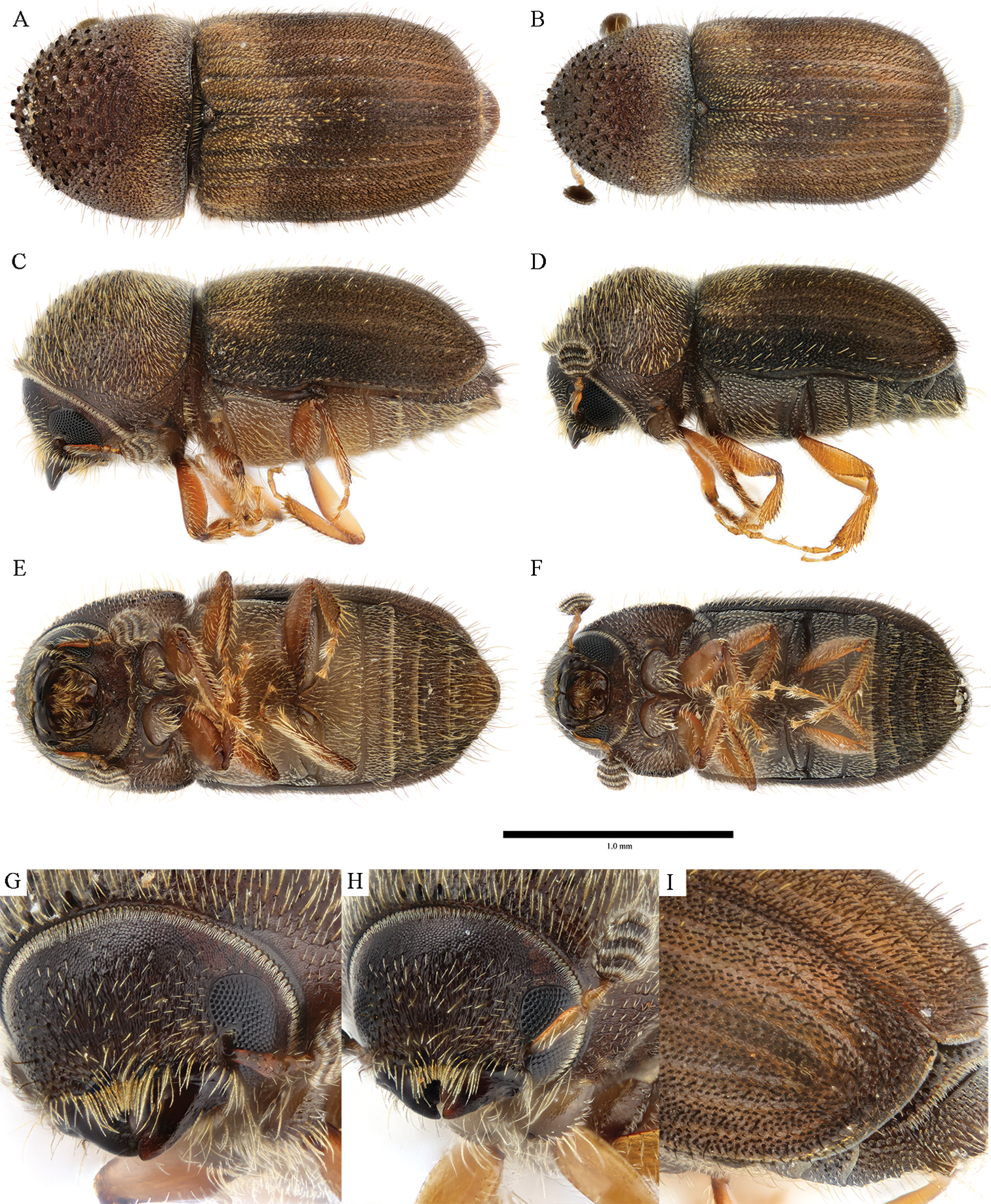
- Cryphalus mangiferae A, C, E, G, H female, B, D, F, H, I male

Scientific classification
- Domain: Eukaryota
- Kingdom: Animalia
- Phylum: Arthropoda
- Class: Insecta
- Order: Coleoptera
- Suborder: Polyphaga
- Infraorder: Cucujiformia
- Family: Curculionidae
- Genus: Cryphalus
- Species: C. mangiferae

Binomial name
- Cryphalus mangiferae Stebbing, 1914

Synonyms
- Hypocryphalus mangiferae

= Cryphalus mangiferae =

Species of beetle

Cryphalus mangiferae, the mango bark beetle, is a tiny tropical bark beetle which attacks mango trees (Mangifera indica). The species belongs to the family Curculionidae, subfamily Scolytinae. It is often cited as a vector of plant pathogenic fungi infecting mango trees and in some countries like Pakistan it is regarded as a serious threat to mango cultivation.

== Distribution ==
C. mangiferae has been first described from India and is widely distributed in tropical regions, that is southern Asia, Oceania, Australia, Africa and Central/South America, including the Caribbean. It is believed to be native to southern Asia and introduced into agricultural areas in other tropical regions. See the Bark and Ambrosia Beetles of North and Central America for a complete list of distribution records.

== Biology ==
Like other members of the genus Cryphalus, the adults of C. mangiferae are tiny, only 1.6–2.2 mm long and about 2.2x longer than wide. C. mangiferae can be distinguished from other species of this genus "by the frons with a finely aciculate texture, the pronotal disc which is long, and has coarse hair-like setae, the elytral striae which are barely impressed but apparent by the rows without ground vestiture, and by the shape of ground vestiture which have tapered tips." While mango is the most important host tree, infestations have been also recorded from other tree hosts in the family Anacardiaceae like Choerospondias axillaris.

On mango, mainly stressed or diseased trees are attacked, less often healthy trees. The females lay eggs under the bark and these hatch after 4–5 days. The larvae feed under the inner bark, forming irregular galleries. There are 5 larval stages and the whole development from egg to adult is completed in about 4 weeks. After emerging from the pupae, the adults still spend about 2 weeks under the bark, during which time they mature, feed and complete the sclerotization of their cuticle. There are 3–4 overlapping generations per year.

== Disease transmission ==
Cryphalus mangiferae is often associated with wilting mango trees infected by species of plant-pathogenic fungi from the genus Ceratocystis. Bark beetles are often vectors of plant diseases and have special structures for carrying symbiotic fungi called mycangia. The associated fungal disease has been called 'mango wilt' or 'mango sudden decline' and is found in Pakistan, Oman and Brazil.

The symptoms of mango wilt have been described as branch death, wilting foliage and bark discoloration. Mango trees may die from the disease within a few months. The disease has been most frequently attributed to infections by the fungus Ceratocystis fimbriata, a common plant pathogen involved in diseases of various crops and trees. However, in Pakistan and Oman a new but closely related Ceratocystis species, Ceratocystis manginecans, has been described in 2007 as being associated with Cryphalus mangiferae and as the causal agent of mango wilt. The phylogenetic relationship between Ceratocystis fimbriata, Ceratocystis manginecans and 3 other closely related species of Ceratocystis associated with mango diseases has been subsequently studied on more than 200 isolates. These studies suggested that mango wilt is caused by different genotypes of Ceratocystis fimbriata rather than a complex of closely related species.
