= Karl Lindemann =

Russian entomologist (1844–1929)

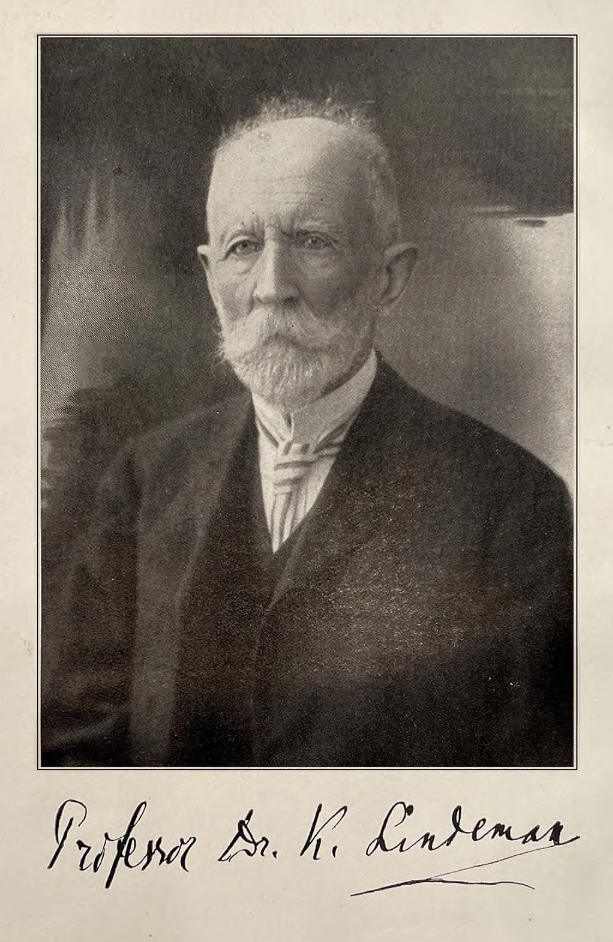

Karl Eduardovich Lindemann (26 October 1844 – 1 February 1929) was a Russian-German entomologist and comparative anatomist who worked in Imperial Russia. He was also politically active and involved in the causes of German colonial settlers in Russia.

Lindemann was born in Nizhny Novgorod in the Russian Empire where his father Gustav Magnus Eduard Lindemann (1806–1864) was a medical doctor. Hist maternal grandmother was Baron von Frey, physician to Tsar Paul I. His father had trained in Tartu and started medical practice in Russia where his brother Edward (1842–1897) was an astronomer at the observatory in Pulkovo. After being tutored at home he went to the gymnasium and graduated in 1859 to join the University of Kazan to study medicine. Being only 15, he needed special permission to enter university. In 1860 he went to Moscow University and trained in physiology under P.P. Einbrodt. With a recommendation from Karl Ernst von Baer he went to the University of Dorpat. He published a thesis in 1863 on sarcosporidian parasites in the heart and kidneys. The causal organism was later described in 1878 by Sebastian Rivolta and named as Sarcocystis lindemanni. In 1865 he became an assistant at the Petrovsky Agricultural Academy (later the Timiryazev Academy) in Moscow. He began to study agricultural pests and in 1918 he moved to Kiev. In 1921 he became a professor of entomology at Simferopol. He published a monograph on the bark beetles of Russia in 1876. He lost eyesight and went to lived in a German Mennonite settlement in died in Ohrloff, Ukraine, where he died in 1929.

Lindemann was politically active from 1905 and was part of a conservative liberal group of German Octoberists. In 1914 he was active in seeking rights for German settlers in Russia but German-owned land holdings were liquidated in 1915. He organized a meeting of Germans again after the 1917 revolution. His son Vladimir (1868–1933) became a professor at Kiev.
