= Cryptocarenus =

Scientific classification
- Kingdom: Animalia
- Phylum: Arthropoda
- Class: Insecta
- Order: Coleoptera
- Suborder: Polyphaga
- Infraorder: Cucujiformia
- Family: Curculionidae
- Subtribe: Cryphalina
- Genus: Cryptocarenus; Eggers, 1937

Genus of beetles

Cryptocarenus is a genus of typical bark beetles in the family Curculionidae. There are more than 20 described species in Cryptocarenus.

== Species ==
These 25 species belong to the genus Cryptocarenus:

- Cryptocarenus acaciae Schedl
- Cryptocarenus adustus Eggers, 1933b
- Cryptocarenus amazonicus Wood, 2007
- Cryptocarenus barinensis Wood, 2007
- Cryptocarenus beaveri Wood, 2007
- Cryptocarenus bolivianus Eggers
- Cryptocarenus brasiliensis Wood & Bright, 1992
- Cryptocarenus brevicollis Eggers, 1937a
- Cryptocarenus carabicus Eggers
- Cryptocarenus caraibicus Eggers, 1937a
- Cryptocarenus coronatus Wood, 1971
- Cryptocarenus diadematus Eggers, 1937a
- Cryptocarenus frontalis Wood, 2007
- Cryptocarenus harringtoni Wood & Bright, 1992
- Cryptocarenus heveae Wood & Bright, 1992
- Cryptocarenus laevigatus Wood & Bright, 1992
- Cryptocarenus lepidus Wood, 1971
- Cryptocarenus pilosus Eggers, 1937a
- Cryptocarenus porosus Wood, 1954a
- Cryptocarenus pubescens Wood, 1986c
- Cryptocarenus punctifrons Schedl, 1939d
- Cryptocarenus pygmaeus Schedl
- Cryptocarenus seriatus Eggers, 1933
- Cryptocarenus spatulatus Wood, 1986c
- Cryptocarenus tropicalis Wood, 2007
