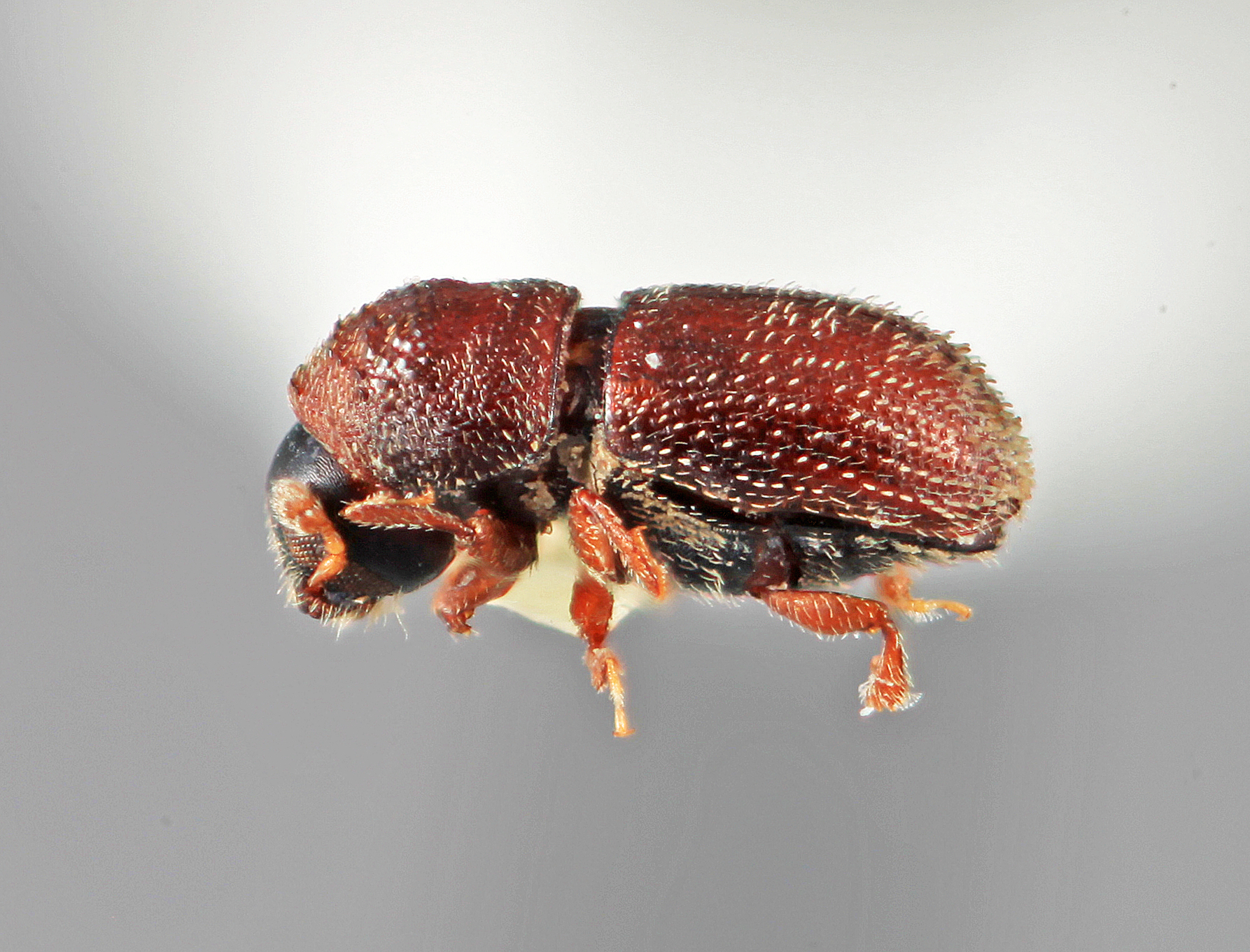
- Cryphalogenes euphorbiae, the type species

Scientific classification
- Kingdom: Animalia
- Phylum: Arthropoda
- Class: Insecta
- Order: Coleoptera
- Suborder: Polyphaga
- Infraorder: Cucujiformia
- Family: Curculionidae
- Subfamily: Scolytinae
- Genus: Cryphalogenes; Wood, 1980

Type species
- Cryphalogenes euphorbiae Wood, 1980

Species
- 2 species (see text)

= Cryphalogenes =

Genus of beetles

Cryphalogenes is a genus of weevils belonging to the family Hydrophilidae endemic to the island of Sri Lanka.

== Species ==
There are two species:

- Cryphalogenes euphorbiae Wood, 1980
- Cryphalogenes exiguus Wood, 1980

Both species were collected from Euphorbia antiquorum.
