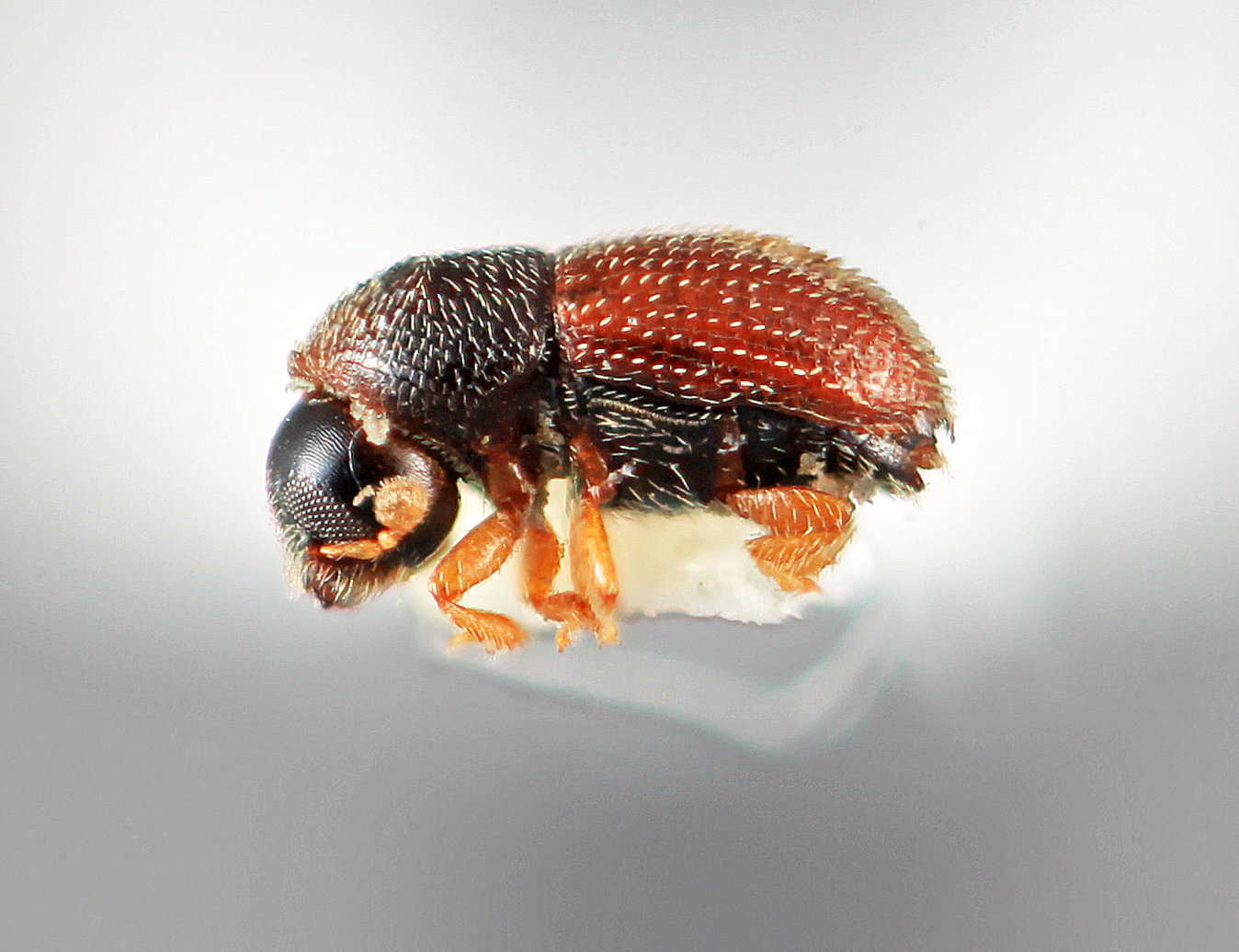
- Holotype

Scientific classification
- Kingdom: Animalia
- Phylum: Arthropoda
- Class: Insecta
- Order: Coleoptera
- Suborder: Polyphaga
- Infraorder: Cucujiformia
- Family: Curculionidae
- Genus: Cryphalogenes
- Species: C. exiguus

Binomial name
- Cryphalogenes exiguus Wood, 1980

= Cryphalogenes exiguus =

Species of beetle

Cryphalogenes exiguus is a species of weevil. It is found in Sri Lanka.

== Description ==
Length of the male is about 0.8 to 1.0 mm.
