= Trischidias =

Scientific classification
- Kingdom: Animalia
- Phylum: Arthropoda
- Class: Insecta
- Order: Coleoptera
- Suborder: Polyphaga
- Infraorder: Cucujiformia
- Family: Curculionidae
- Subtribe: Cryphalina
- Genus: Trischidias; Hopkins, 1915

Genus of beetles

Trischidias is a genus of typical bark beetles in the family Curculionidae. There are about 11 described species in Trischidias.

== Species ==
These 11 species belong to the genus Trischidias:

- Trischidias atoma Wood & Bright, 1992
- Trischidias atomus Alonso-Zarazaga, M.A., Lyal & C.H.C., 2009
- Trischidias exigua Wood, 1986
- Trischidias georgiae Hopkins, 1915
- Trischidias minutissima Wood, 1954
- Trischidias nigrina Wood & Bright, 1992
- Trischidias puertoricensis Bright & Torres, 2006
- Trischidias spinata Wood & Bright, 1992
- Trischidias spinatus (Schedl, 1977d)
- Trischidias striata Atkinson, 1993a
- Trischidias striatus Atkinson, 1993a
