= Ulmus 'Morton Plainsman' =

Elm cultivar

- Genus: Ulmus
- Hybrid parentage: U. pumila × U. davidiana var. japonica
- Cultivar: 'Morton Plainsman' = Vanguard
- Origin: US

Ulmus 'Morton Plainsman' (selling name Vanguard) is a hybrid cultivar raised by the Morton Arboretum from a crossing of Siberian Elm (female parent) and a Japanese Elm grown from openly pollinated seed donated by the Agriculture Canada Research Station at Morden, Manitoba. Tested in the US National Elm Trial coordinated by Colorado State University, Vanguard averaged a survival rate of 78% after 10 years.

== Description ==
Vanguard has modest upright growth, increasing in height by an average of 0.8 m in an assessment at U C Davis, with leaves much the same size and colour of the American elm. However, its performance in the southern United States has not impressed, and it was dismissed, along with its Morton stablemates Commendation and Triumph, as "ugly" by Michael Dirr, Professor of Horticulture at the University of Georgia , on account of its "wild" growth and splaying branches.

== Pests and diseases ==
Although resistant to Dutch elm disease in the US, Vanguard remains very susceptible to pests such as the elm-leaf beetle Xanthogaleruca luteola , Japanese beetle, and cankerworms.

== Cultivation ==
In trials at the University of Minnesota, Vanguard was found to have the second highest (after Danada Charm) incidence of branch breakage occasioned by bark inclusions. However, the tree has a high degree of drought and cold tolerance making it particularly suitable for afforestation in the Great Plains. In artificial freezing tests at the Morton Arboretum the LT50 (temp. at which 50% of tissues die) was found to be −40°C.

The tree is currently being evaluated in the National Elm Trial coordinated by Colorado State University. It is not known to have been introduced to Australasia.

== Hybrid cultivars ==
Vanguard was crossed with the hybrid cultivar Accolade; a selection from the resultant seedlings was marketed under the name 'Charisma', later changed to 'Morton Glossy' = Triumph.

== Accessions ==
North America

- Bartlett Tree Experts, US. Acc. nos. 2001–106, 2001-108
- Brenton Arboretum, US. 5 trees, acquired 2009. Acc. no. not known.
- Chicago Botanic Garden, US. 2 trees, no other details available.
- Dawes Arboretum, Newark, Ohio, US. 1 tree, accession no. 2004-0047.001.
- Holden Arboretum, US. Acc. no. 00–127
- Morton Arboretum, US. Acc. nos. 273–97, 4–2004, 156–2005.
- Smith College, US. Acc. no. 36505
- University of Idaho Arboretum, US. Two trees. Acc. no. 2000093

Europe

- Grange Farm Arboretum, Lincolnshire, UK. Acc. no. 1139.

== Nurseries ==
North America

- Acorn Farms, Galena, Ohio, US.
- Bailey Nurseries , St. Paul, Minnesota, US.
- J. Frank Schmidt & Son , Boring, Oregon, US.
- Johnson's Nursery , Menomonee Falls, Wisconsin, US.
- Sun Valley Garden Centre, Eden Prairie, Minnesota, US.
