= Ulmus 'Morton Red Tip' =

Elm cultivar

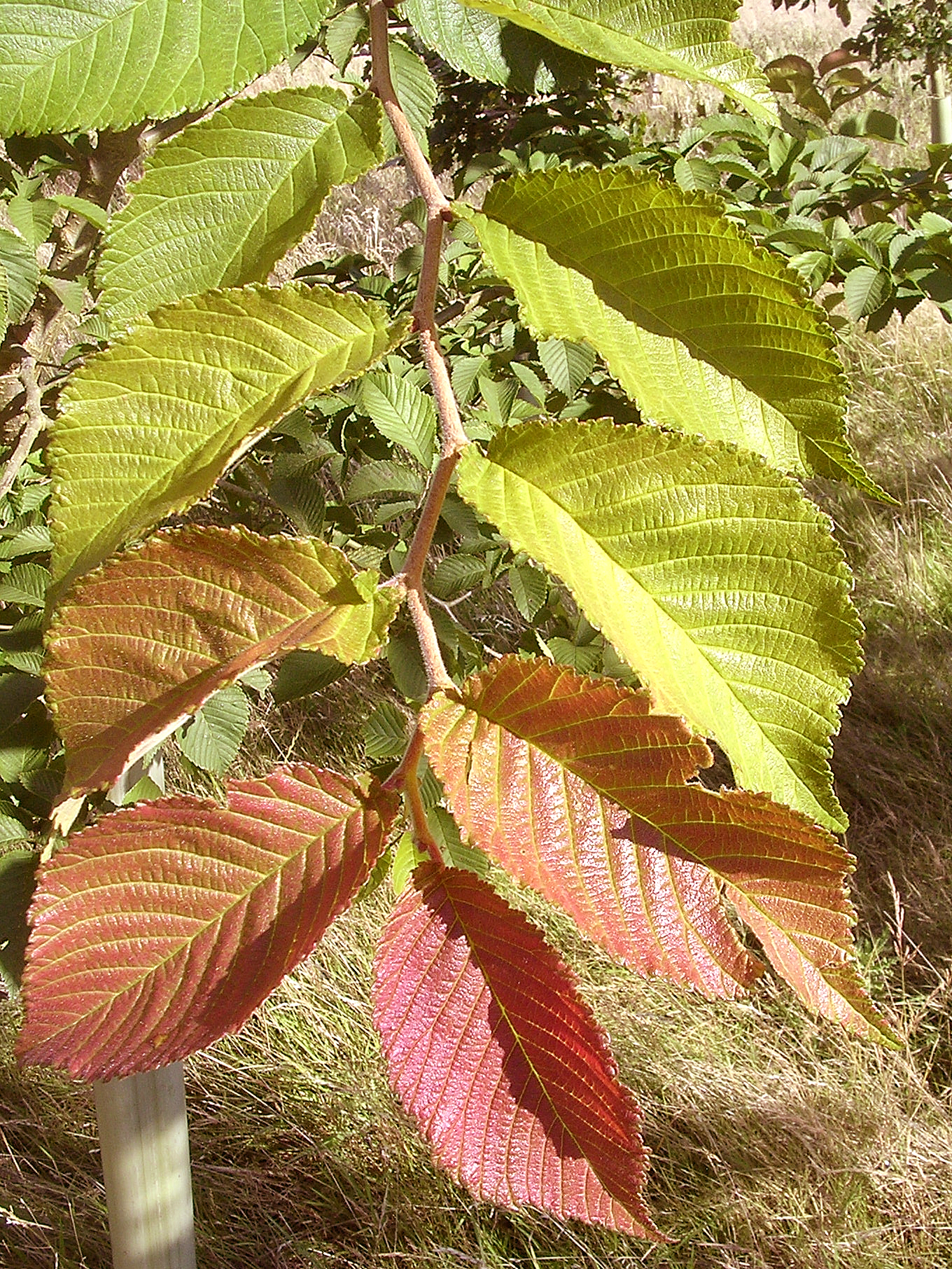
- Genus: Ulmus
- Hybrid parentage: Ulmus 'Morton' = Accolade open pollination
- Cultivar: 'Morton Red Tip' = Danada Charm
- Origin: US

Ulmus 'Morton Red Tip' (selling name Danada Charm) is a hybrid cultivar raised by the Morton Arboretum from an open pollination of Ulmus 'Morton'. The tree has occasionally been reported as a hybrid of Accolade with the Siberian Elm Ulmus pumila, an error probably owing to the commercial propagation of the tree by grafting onto U. pumila rootstocks. Tested in the US National Elm Trial coordinated by Colorado State University, Danada Charm averaged a survival rate of 77.5% after 10 years.

== Description ==
Danada Charm has a graceful, vase-shaped habit resembling the American elm Ulmus americana with foliage tinged red on emergence.

== Pests and diseases ==
Although resistant to Dutch elm disease in the US, Danada Charm is very susceptible to the elm leaf beetle Xanthogaleruca luteola, Japanese beetle, and Gypsy moth; it is also moderately preferred by cankerworms.

== Cultivation ==
Danada Charm is very cold hardy; in artificial freezing tests at the arboretum the LT50 (temp. at which 50% of tissues die) was found to be −31 °C. However, the tree is notorious for its stem breakage owing to narrow crotch angles and included bark; in trials at the University of Minnesota it had the unhappy distinction of being the worst of 17 cultivars for breakage. The tree is currently being evaluated in the National Elm Trial coordinated by Colorado State University.

Danada Charm is being promoted by the Chicagoland Grows corporation but is not widely available in the United States. Very rare in Europe, it is not known (2016) to have been introduced to Australasia.

== Etymology ==
The name Danada in Danada Charm is a conflation of the given names of Daniel F. and Ada L. Rice, whose eponymous foundation helped sponsor the elm breeding program at the Morton Arboretum.

== Accessions ==
North America

- Brenton Arboretum, US. No details available.
- Chicago Botanic Garden, US. 2 trees. No acc. details available.
- Dawes Arboretum , US. 2 trees. No acc. details available.
- Morton Arboretum, US. Acc. no. 60–2003.
- University of Idaho Arboretum, US. Acc. no. 1998012

Europe

- Grange Farm Arboretum, UK. Acc. no. 1140.

== Nurseries ==
North America

- J. Frank Schmidt & Son Co., Boring, Oregon, US.
- Johnson's Nursery , Menomonee Falls, Wisconsin, US.
- Sun Valley Garden Centre, Eden Prairie, Minnesota, US.
