= Ulmus 'Morton Stalwart' =

Elm cultivar

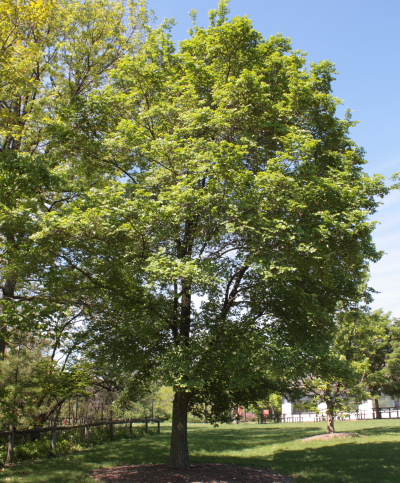
- Commendation, 14 years old.
- Genus: Ulmus
- Hybrid parentage: Accolade × (U. minor × U. pumila)
- Cultivar: 'Morton Stalwart' = Commendation
- Origin: US

Ulmus 'Morton Stalwart' (selling name Commendation), is a Morton Arboretum hybrid cultivar arising from a controlled crossing of Accolade with the hybrid of a Field Elm U. minor from eastern Russia and a Siberian Elm U. pumila. Tested in the US National Elm Trial coordinated by Colorado State University, Commendation averaged a survival rate of 85% after 10 years.

== Description ==
The branches are upright, but the form of the tree is more oval than vase-shaped; the leaves are relatively large. However, examples grown in the warmer climes of the southern United States have not impressed, and it was dismissed, along with its Morton stablemates Triumph and Vanguard, as 'ugly' by Michael Dirr, Professor of Horticulture at the University of Georgia , on account of its 'wild' growth and splaying branches.

== Pests and diseases ==
Although resistant to Dutch elm disease in the United States, the tree is moderately susceptible to insects, notably elm leaf beetle Xanthogaleruca luteola, Japanese beetle and Gypsy moth.

== Cultivation ==
Commendation is vigorous and robust, adjudged the third fastest-growing cultivar of 17 assessed by the University of Minnesota and fourth out of 15 in trials at UC Davis. The tree is also extremely tolerant of drought and cold; in artificial freezing tests at the Morton Arboretum the tree was found cold-hardy to −40°C.

Commendation was introduced by Chicagoland Grows and is currently being evaluated in the National Elm Trial coordinated by Colorado State University. The tree was introduced to the UK in 2014, but is not known (2016) to have been introduced to Australasia.

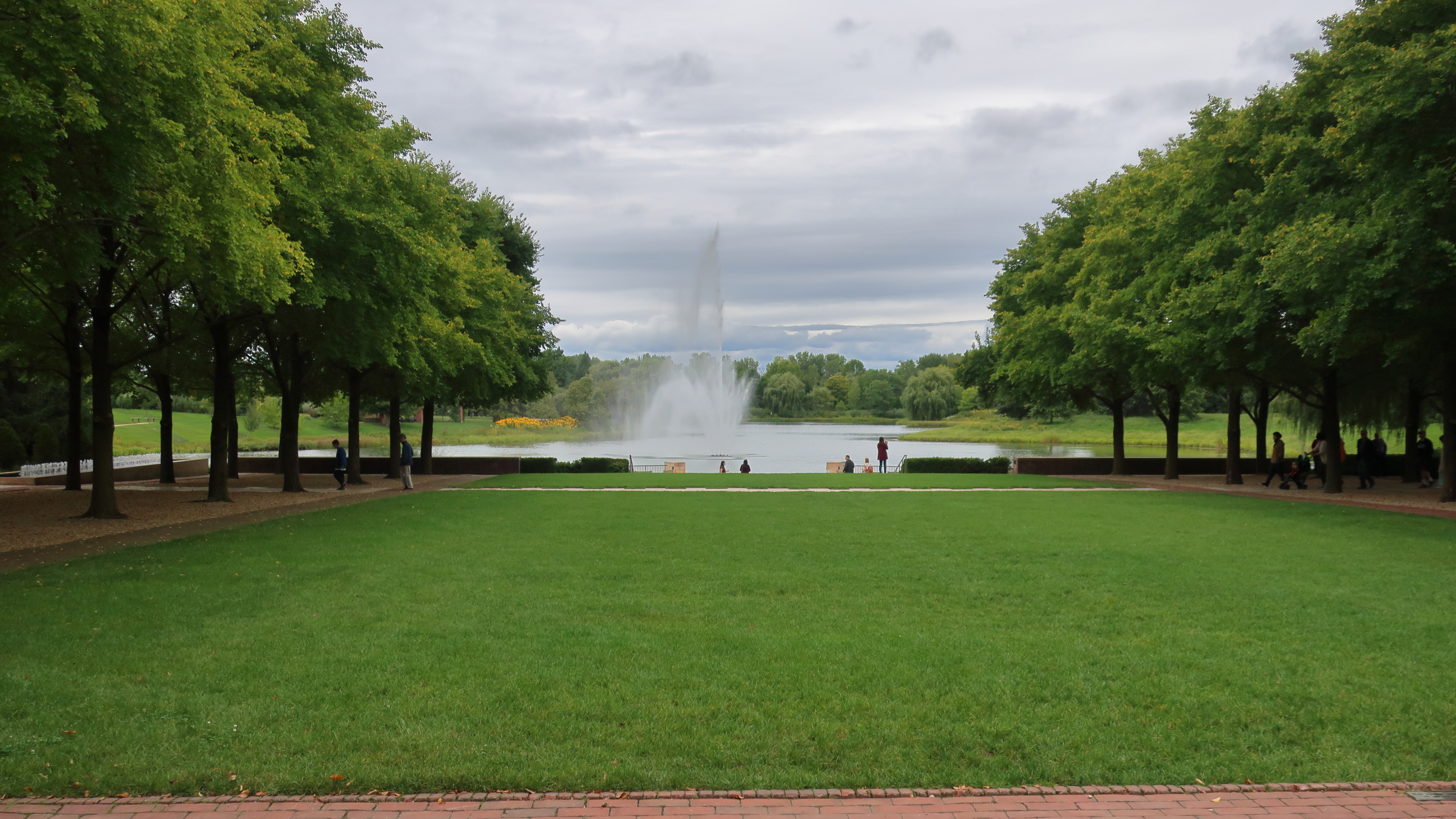
Ulmus 'Morton Stalwart' Commendation™, Esplanade, North Lake, Chicago Botanic Garden (September 2019)

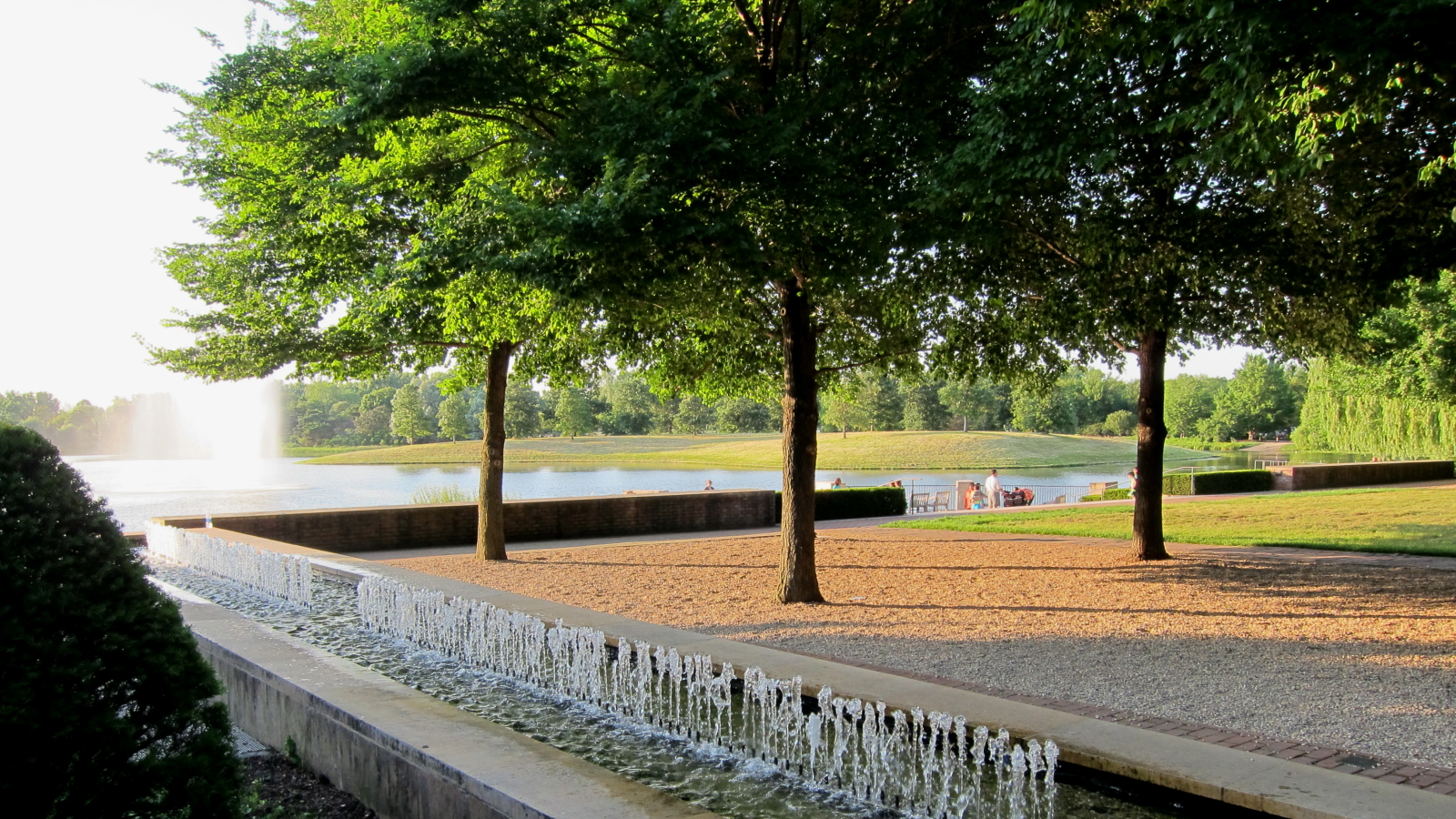
Boles of 'Morton Stalwart' Commendation™

== Accessions ==
North America

- Arnold Arboretum, US. Acc. no. 131–2002
- Bickelhaupt Arboretum, US. Acc. no. 02–018
- Brenton Arboretum, US. 5 trees, acquired 2009. Acc. no. not known.
- Chicago Botanic Garden, US. 1 tree, planted in the Parking Lots; no other details available.
- Dawes Arboretum, Newark, Ohio, US. 2 trees, accession nos. 2004-0046.001 and 2004-0046.002.
- Holden Arboretum, US. Acc. no. 00–124
- Morton Arboretum, US. Acc. nos. 274–97, 109–2006.
- Smith College, US. Acc. no. 36405
- University of Idaho Arboretum, US. Two trees. Acc. no. 2000089

Europe

- Grange Farm Arboretum, Lincolnshire, UK. Acc. no. 1141.
