= Ulmus 'Morton' =

Elm cultivar

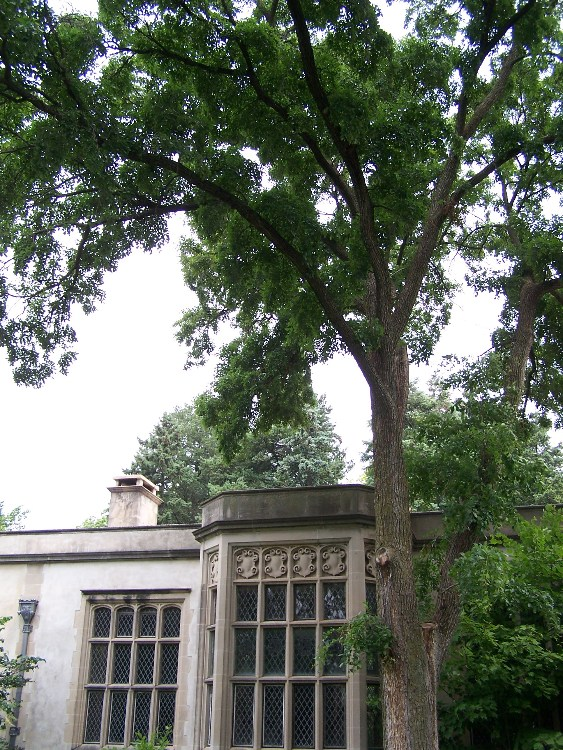
- Accolade, Morton Arboretum, Illinois
- Genus: Ulmus
- Hybrid parentage: U. davidiana var. japonica × U. davidiana var. japonica
- Cultivar: 'Morton' = Accolade
- Origin: US

Ulmus 'Morton' (selling name Accolade) is an elm cultivar cloned from a putative intraspecific hybrid planted at the Morton Arboretum in 1924, which itself originated as seed collected from a tree at the Arnold Arboretum in Massachusetts. Although this tree was originally identified as Ulmus crassifolia, it is now believed to have been a hybrid of the Japanese elm (Ulmus davidiana var. japonica) and Wilson's elm (formerly Ulmus wilsoniana, but also sunk as U. davidiana var. japonica). Accolade has proven to be the most successful cultivar tested in the US National Elm Trial, averaging a survival rate of 92.5% overall. It had also become the most commonly planted elm in the US by 2023.

== Description ==
The parent tree at the Morton Arboretum is noted for the resemblance of its habit to the American elm Ulmus americana, its upright-arching branches creating the familiar vase-shape, although the tree does not grow as large as the iconic native elm, reaching scarcely 20 m at maturity. Its glossy, deep green leaves are also markedly smaller, rarely exceeding 8 cm in length. The tree is commercially propagated by grafting onto an Ulmus pumila rootstock.

Accolade has a propensity to produce co-dominant stems and major branches with bark inclusions, demanding corrective pruning on at least an annual basis where planted in towns.

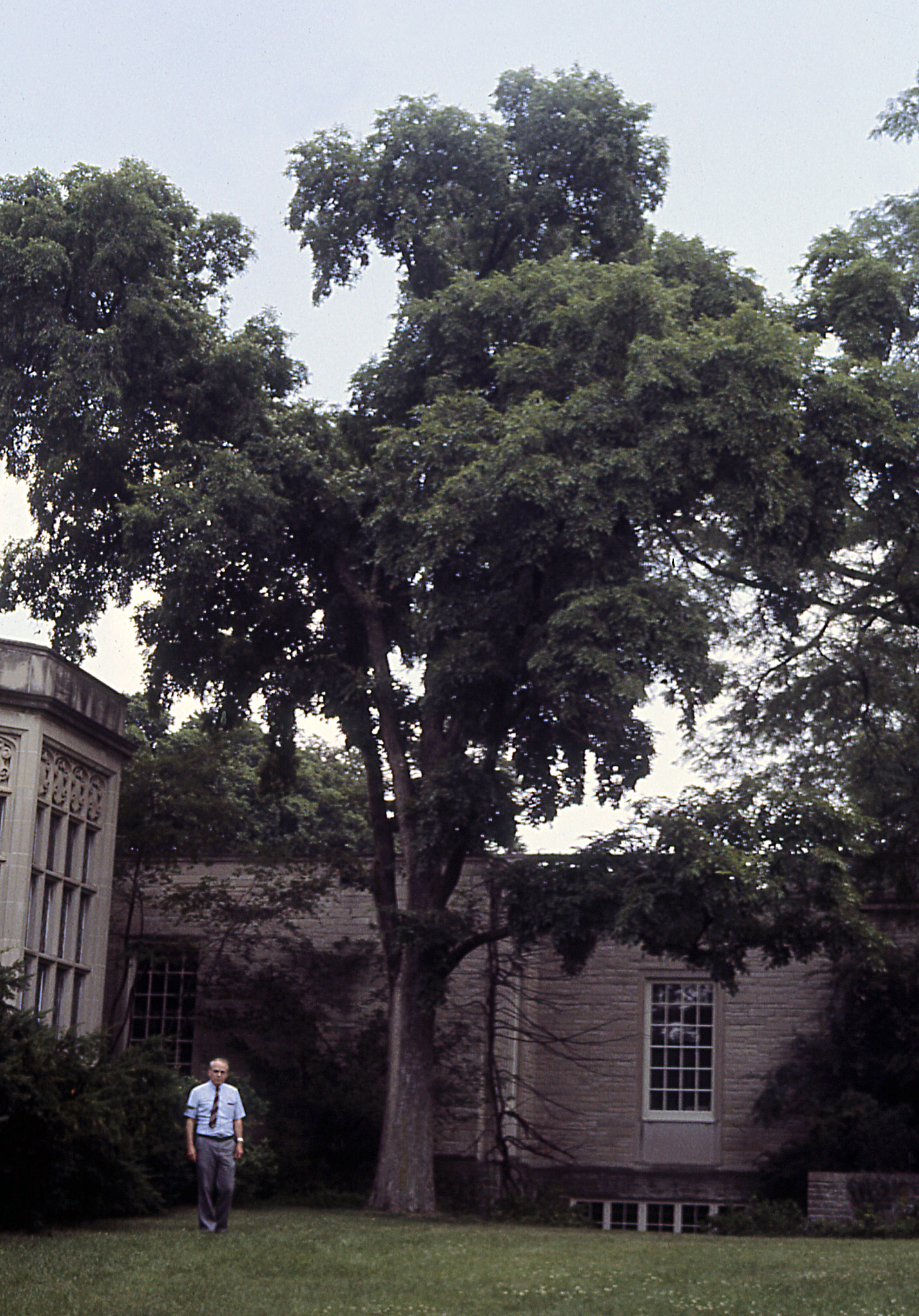
The parent tree in July 1987

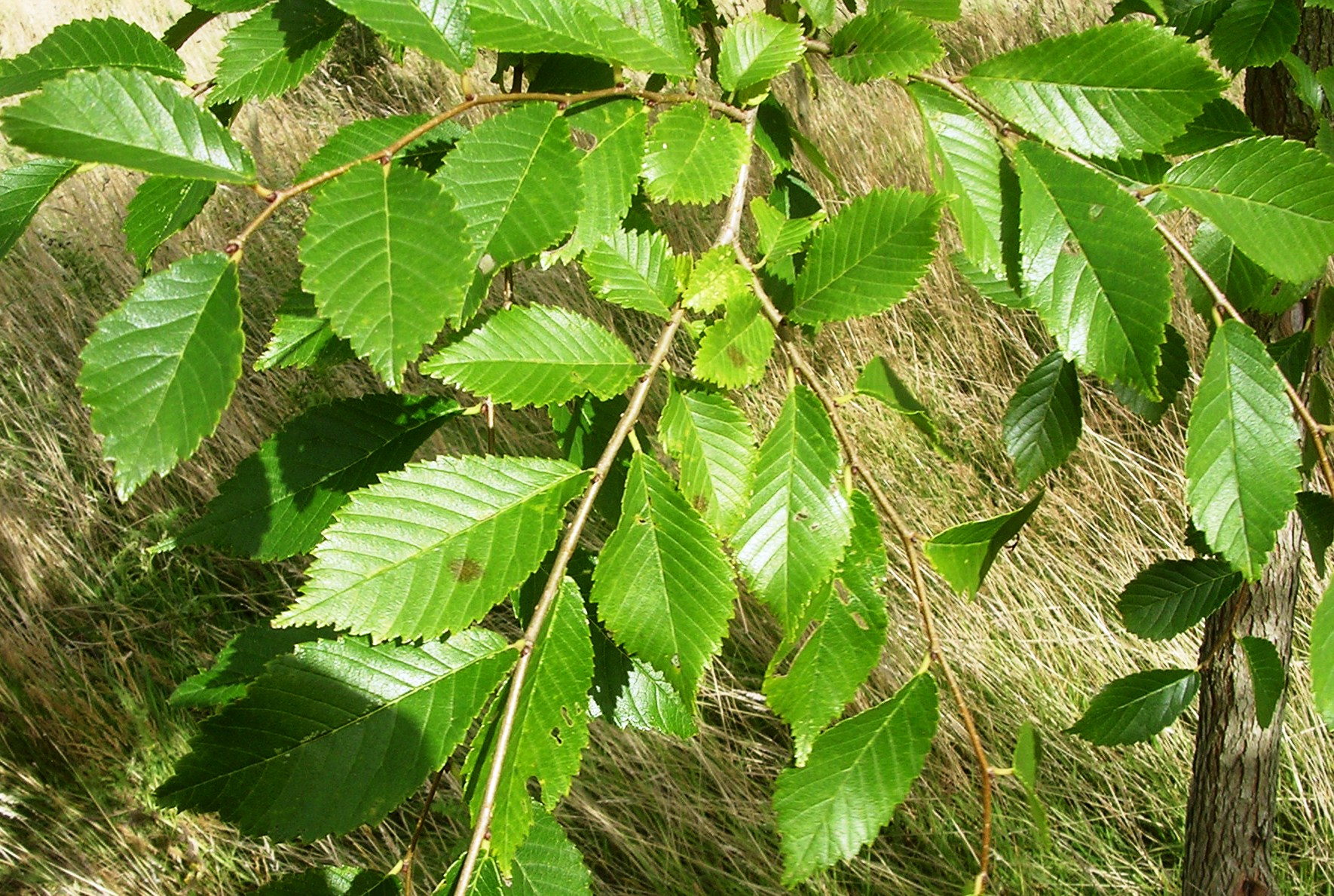
Accolade foliage, midsummer

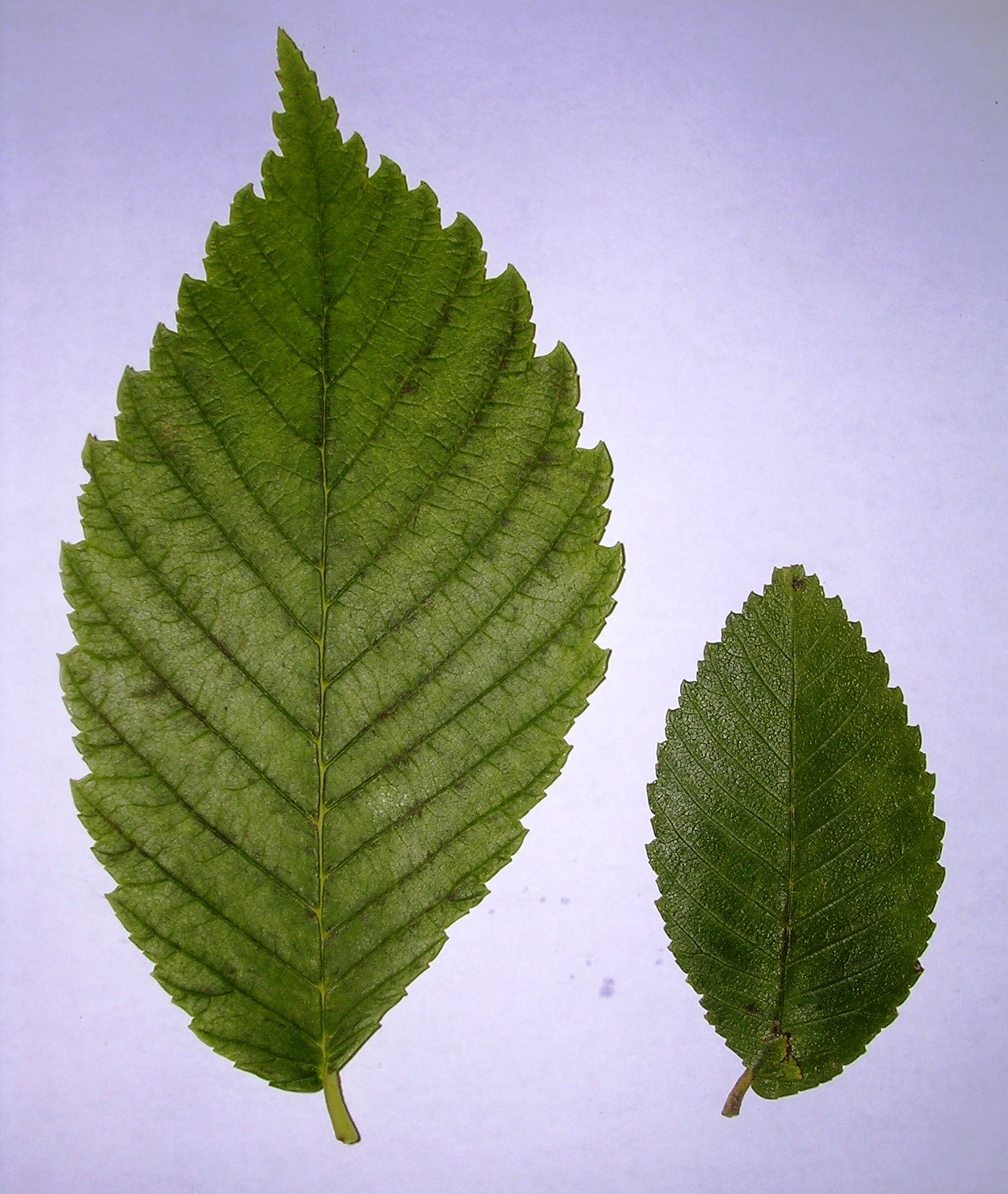
American elm (left) and Accolade leaf comparison

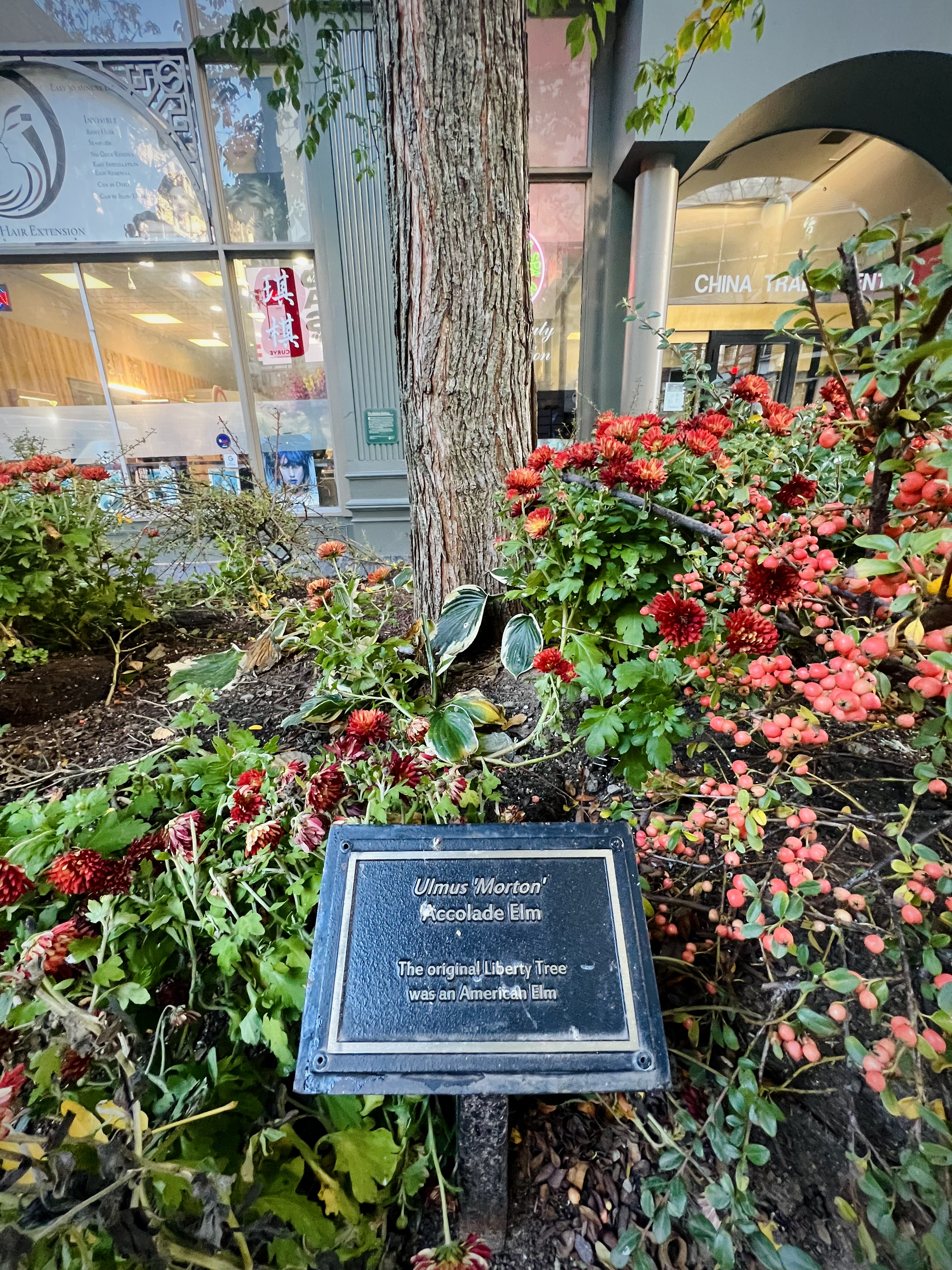
Accolade bark

== Pests and diseases ==
In its 90+ years, the original tree at Morton has survived three epidemics of Dutch elm disease there unscathed. However, two trees included in trials at the University of Minnesota were found to be afflicted by the disease in 2004, although one appears to have recovered completely. The cultivar has also proved to be highly resistant to elm yellows and the elm leaf beetle Xanthogaleruca luteola , but not to the Japanese beetle, which can cause extensive foliar damage.

== Cultivation ==
Accolade is reputed to grow well in almost all soils save those excessively wet, and is notably drought-tolerant and cold hardy. In artificial freezing tests at the Morton Arboretum the LT50 (temp. at which 50% of tissues die) was found to be −35.5 °C. The tree grows vigorously at first, gaining as much as one metre per annum, but slows to approximately half that rate with maturity. Thus, a typical 20-year-old tree could be expected to have reached 14 m in height with a crown about 5 m in width. Trees grown by Tollgate Education, Michigan State University, at Novi were the most vigorous and robust of the 37 different cultivars and species under assessment, described as looking like 'men among boys'. Accolade is being evaluated in the National Elm Trial coordinated by Colorado State University. Accolade was introduced to Europe in 2006 and is now in commerce in the Netherlands.

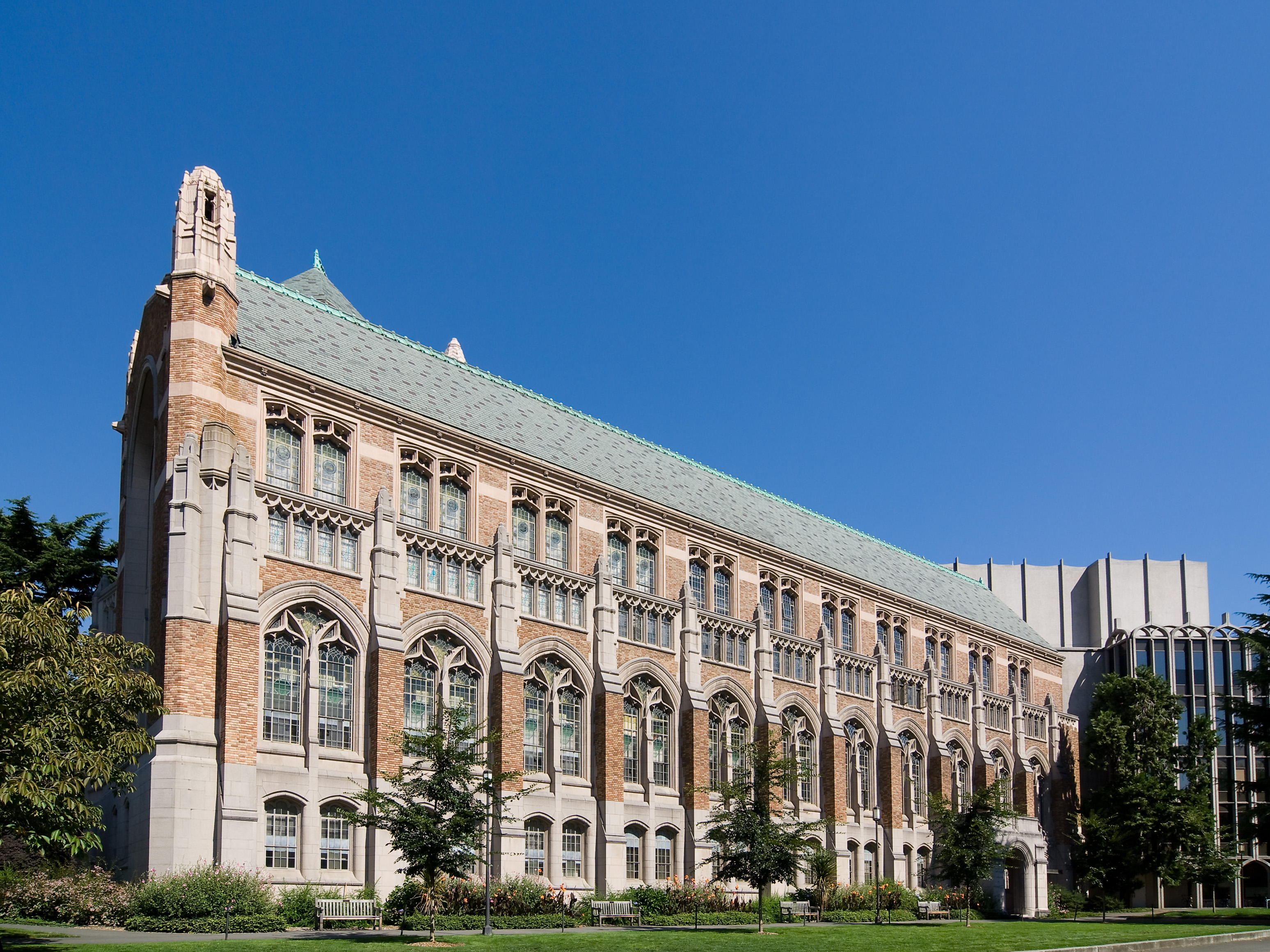
Line of young Accolade by Suzzallo Library, University of Washington, Seattle (2007)

== Hybrid cultivars ==
Accolade was crossed with the hybrid cultivar 'Morton Plainsman' = Vanguard. A selection of the resultant seedlings was marketed under the name 'Charisma', later changed to 'Morton Glossy' = Triumph.

== Synonymy ==
- Thornhill Elm: Anon.

== Accessions ==
North America

- Arnold Arboretum, US. Acc. no. 130–2002
- Bickelhaupt Arboretum, US. Acc. no. 98–051
- Brenton Arboretum, US. No details available.
- Chicago Botanic Garden, US. 3 trees, no other details available.
- Dawes Arboretum, US. 1 tree. No acc. details available.
- Holden Arboretum, US. Acc. nos. 89–76, 91–114, 98–23, L–00–501
- Morton Arboretum, US. Acc. nos. 2352–24, 255–74, 128–92, 272–97, 35–98, 280–2003. 495–2004, 1095–2004, 1246–2004, 1347–2004, 269–2008.
- Parker Arboretum, US. No acc. details.
- Smith College, US. Acc. nos. 20304, 35804, 37505
- University of Idaho Arboretum, US. 2 trees. Acc. no. 1998008.
- University of Washington campus, US. 5 trees.

Europe

- Grange Farm Arboretum, UK. Acc. no. 503.
- Great Fontley Farm, Fareham, UK. Butterfly Conservation Elm Trials plantation, Home Field, one small tree planted 2010.
- Royal Botanic Garden Edinburgh, UK. Acc. no. 20021372

== Nurseries ==
North America

- Acorn Farms, Galena, Ohio, US.
- Bailey Nurseries, St. Paul, Minnesota, US.
- Carlton Plants, LLC, Dayton, Oregon, US.
- Charles J. Fiore, Prairie View, Illinois, US.
- ForestFarm, Williams, Oregon, US.
- J. Frank Schmidt & Son Co., Boring, Oregon, US.
- Johnson's Nursery, Menomonee Falls, Wisconsin, US.
- Linder's Garden Center, St. Paul, Minnesota, US.
- North American Plants, Lafayette, Oregon, US.
- Pea Ridge Forest, Hermann, Missouri, US.
- Sester Farms, Gresham, Oregon, US.
- Sun Valley Garden Centre, Eden Prairie, Minnesota, US.

Europe

- Batouwe Boomkwekerijen B.V., Dodewaard, Netherlands. Potted whips.
- Boomkwekerij Gebr. Van den Berk B.V., Sint-Oedenrode, Netherlands.
