= Ulmus 'Morton Glossy' =

Elm cultivar

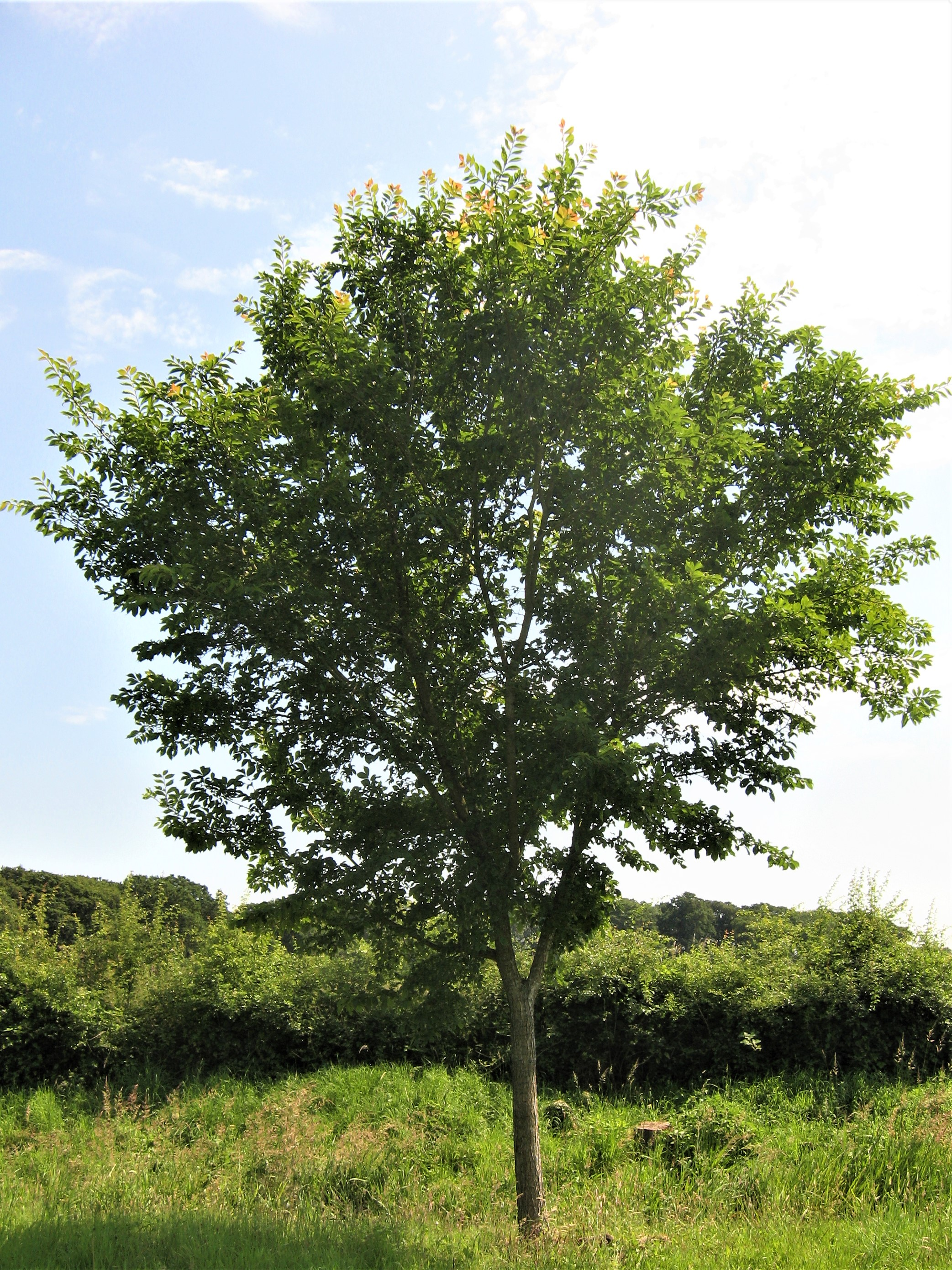
- Triumph aged 15 years, Boarhunt, UK
- Genus: Ulmus
- Hybrid parentage: 'Morton' = Accolade × 'Morton Plainsman' = Vanguard
- Cultivar: 'Morton Glossy' = Triumph
- Origin: US

Ulmus 'Morton Glossy' (selling name Triumph) is a hybrid cultivar raised by the Morton Arboretum, Illinois. Originally named 'Charisma' until it was realized that name had already been registered for another plant, the tree was derived from a crossing of two other hybrid cultivars grown at the Morton: Accolade and Vanguard. Tested in the US National Elm Trial coordinated by Colorado State University, Triumph averaged a survival rate of 86% after 10 years. Triumph was introduced to the UK in 2006 by the Frank P. Matthews nursery in Worcestershire.

== Description ==
Triumph has been promoted in the United States as "strong and symmetrical" in growth and habit. However, its performance in the southern United States has not impressed, and it was dismissed as "ugly" by Michael Dirr, Professor of Horticulture at the University of Georgia , on account of its "wild" growth and splaying branches. It is similar in stature to the American elm and has leaves that are a deep glossy green when mature, < 10 cm in length by 5 cm broad, with rough upper surface and finely toothed margins. The samara is comparatively small, < 10 mm long by 8 mm wide, the seed central. In trials in the UK, Triumph was found to be the first elm cultivar to flush in spring, and the first to shed its leaves in the fall, usually by early October. The tree grew poorly on thin soils over clay, which became very dry in summer, but excelled on floodplain alluvium subjected to brief periods of inundation in winter.

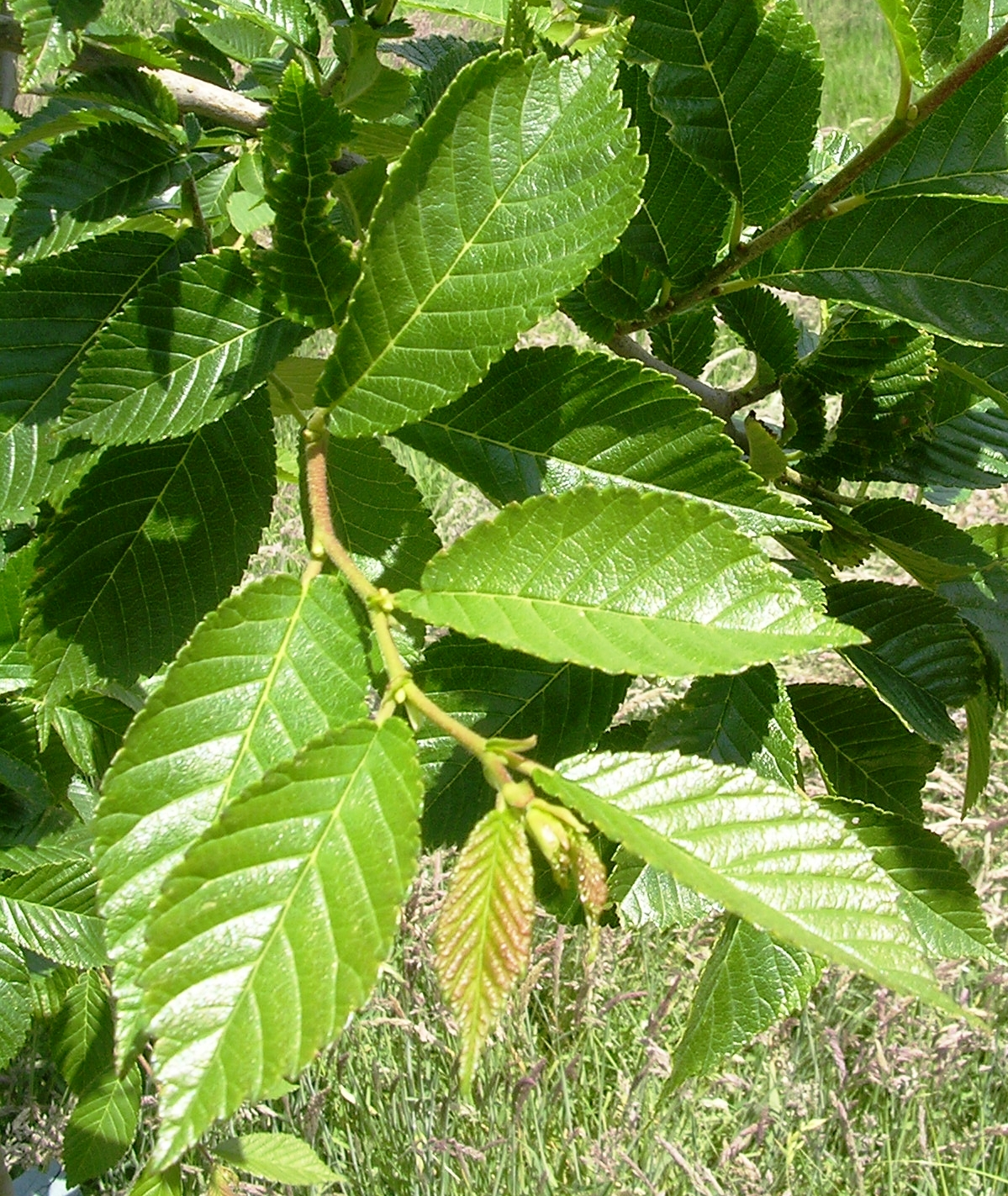
Foliage in midsummer

September foliage

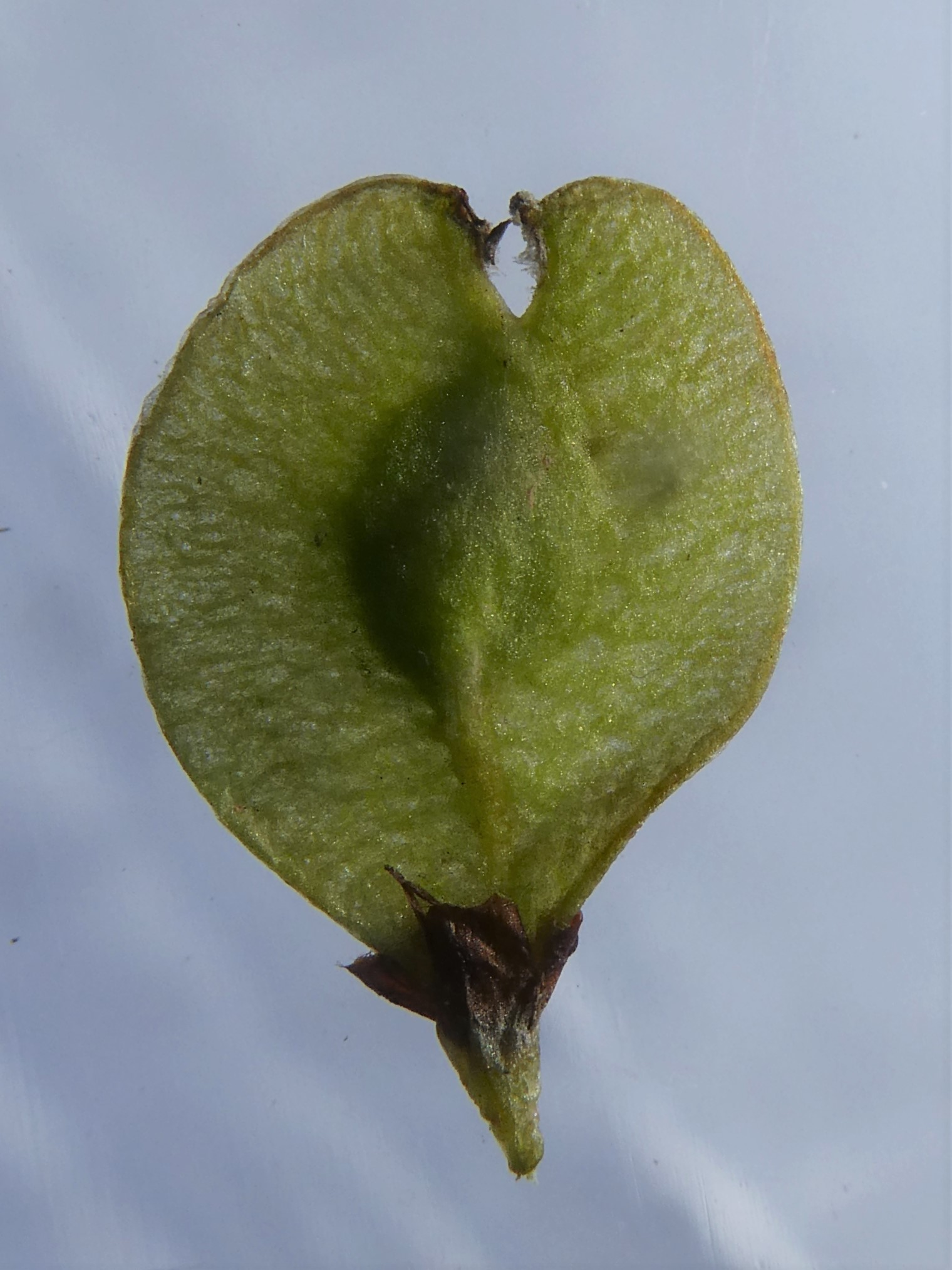
Samara

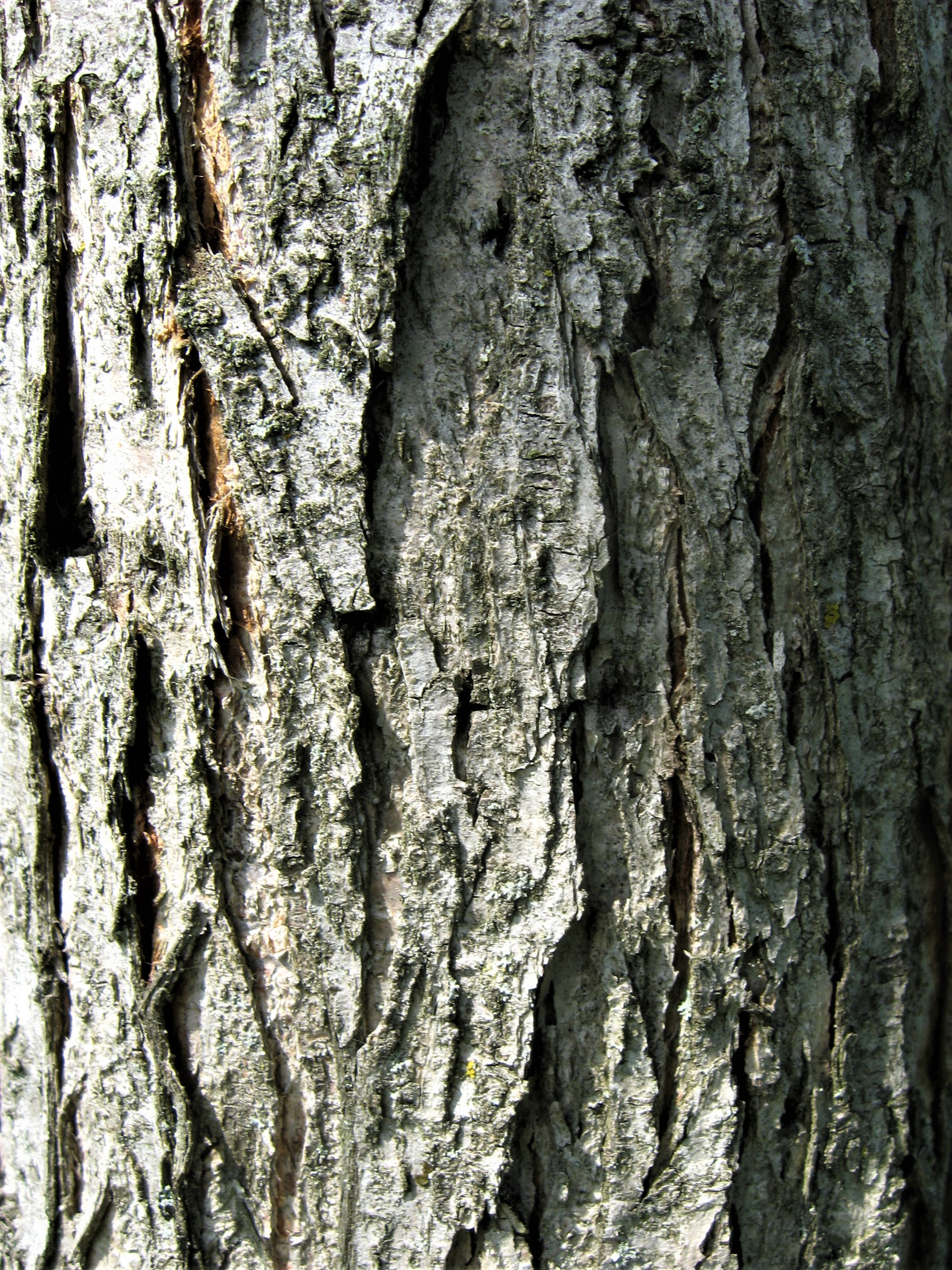
Bark of 15-year-old tree

Bark of young specimen

== Pests and diseases ==
Triumph has a resistance to Dutch elm disease, but is highly susceptible to attack by elm leaf beetle Xanthogaleruca luteola and Japanese beetle.

== Cultivation ==
In commerce, Triumph is usually propagated by grafting onto an Ulmus pumila rootstock. The tree, under its original name of 'Charisma', featured in the elm trials conducted by Northern Arizona University at Holbrook, eastern Arizona. Triumph is very cold-hardy; in artificial freezing tests at the arboretum the LT50 (temp. at which 50% of tissues die) was found to be −40 °C.

The tree is currently being evaluated in the National Elm Trial coordinated by Colorado State University. Triumph was briefly in commerce in the UK, where 180 trees were sold in 2006; several specimens were acquired for assessment by Butterfly Conservation in Hampshire.

== Synonymy ==
- 'Charisma': initial name accorded until 1995.

== Accessions ==
North America

- Arnold Arboretum, US. Acc. no. 132–2002
- Bartlett Tree Experts, US. Acc. nos. 2001–104, 2001–105
- Bickelhaupt Arboretum, US. Acc. no. 02–038
- Chicago Botanic Garden, US. Planted in the Parking Lots, no other details available.
- Dawes Arboretum , US. 3 trees. No acc. details available.
- Morton Arboretum, US. Acc. nos. 135–94, 523–99, 212–2004, 497–2004, 630–2004, 1090–2004.
- Parker Arboretum, US. No acc. details.
- University of Idaho Arboretum, US. Two trees. Acc. no. 2000091

Europe

- Grange Farm Arboretum, UK. Acc. details not known.
- Sir Harold Hillier Gardens, UK. Acc. no: 2007.0260
- Royal Botanic Garden Edinburgh, UK. Acc. no. 20070379

== Nurseries ==
North America

- Acorn Farms, Galena, Ohio, US.
- Bailey Nurseries , St. Paul, Minnesota, US.
- Carlton Plants, LLC, Dayton, Oregon, US.
- Charles J. Fiore, Prairie View, Illinois, US.
- J. Frank Schmidt & Son Co., Boring, Oregon, US.
- Johnson's Nursery , Menomonee Falls, Wisconsin, US.
- North American Plants, Lafayette, Oregon, US.
- Sester Farms, Gresham, Oregon, US.
- Sun Valley Garden Centre, Eden Prairie, Minnesota, US.
