= Ulmus americana 'New Harmony' =

Elm cultivar

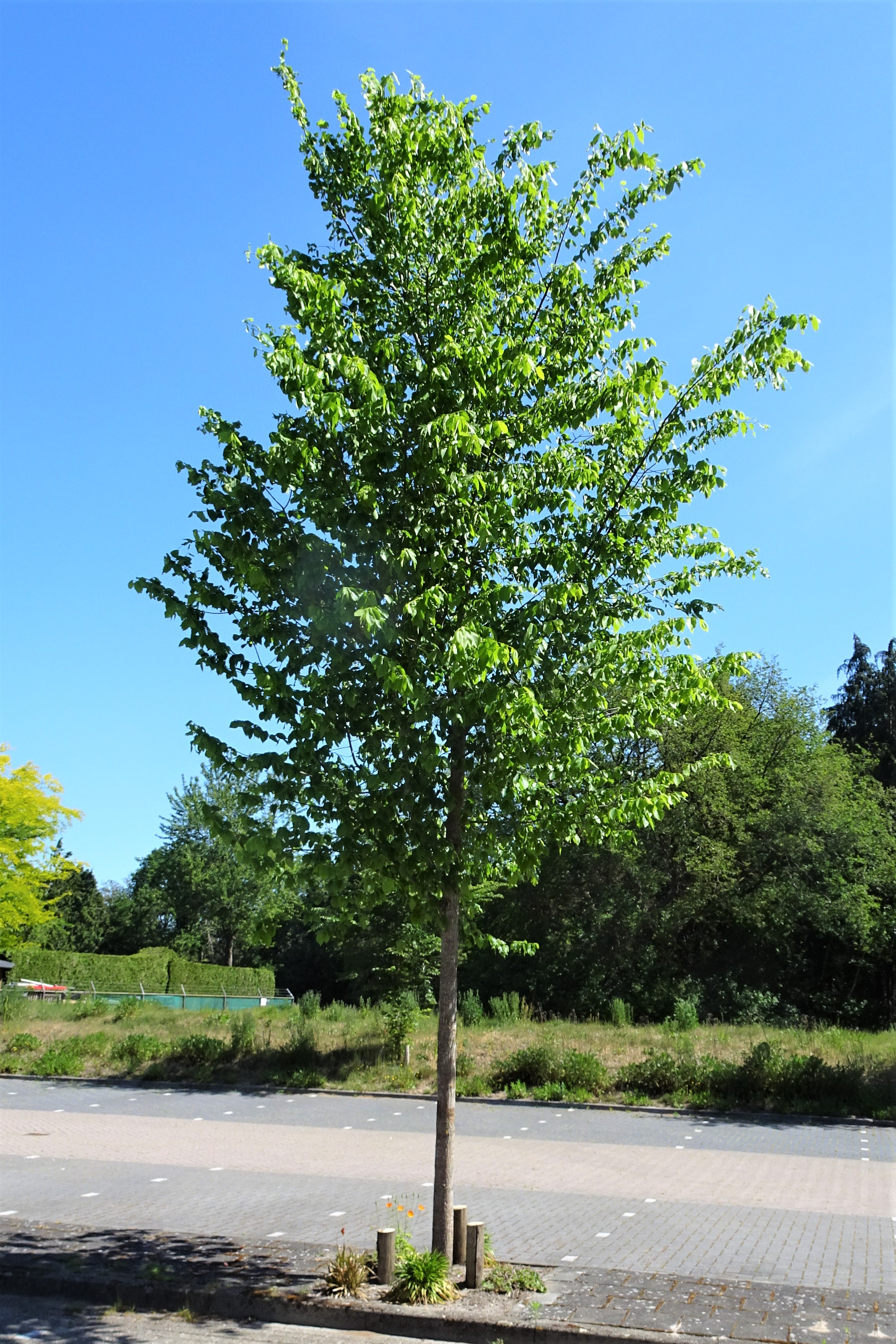
- 'New Harmony' growing in the Netherlands
- Species: Ulmus americana
- Cultivar: 'New Harmony's4s
- Origin: Maryland Agricultural Research Service, US

The American elm cultivar Ulmus americana 'New Harmony' was raised by the Maryland Agricultural Research Service and released by the United States National Arboretum in 1995, along with 'Valley Forge'. 'New Harmony' proved the most successful U. americana cultivar in the US National Elm Trial, averaging a survival rate of 85.5% overall.

== Description ==
'New Harmony' is considered by some to have a more desirable form than 'Valley Forge' as it grows vertically on its own with a minimum of early training. The original parent tree (located on a roadside in Ohio) is already over 20 m high, with a slightly greater crown spread. The bole divides into several erect branches about 10 m above the ground terminating in slender, pendulous branchlets.

Growth is rapid, young trees gaining in height by almost 1.7 m per annum in trials at U C Davis, although d.b.h. increase remained a modest 1.8 cm.

== Pests and diseases ==
Although resistant to Dutch elm disease and elm leaf beetle Xanthogaleruca luteola, like most other American elm cultivars 'New Harmony' is susceptible to elm yellows and Japanese beetle Popillia japonica. In the trials at U C Davis, the trees remained free of leaf curling aphids (Eriosoma), unlike its U. americana stablemates 'Valley Forge' and 'Princeton'.

== Cultivation ==
'New Harmony' is currently being evaluated in the National Elm Trial coordinated by Colorado State University. Five trees stand (2026) before the Student Experience Center, Oregon State University, Corvallis. The tree was introduced to the UK and the Netherlands in 2010.

'New Harmony' on SW Jefferson Way, Corvallis, Oregon (2019)

== Etymology ==
The tree is named for the Indiana town renowned for its social innovations in the 19th century.

== Accessions ==
North America

- Bartlett Tree Experts, US. Acc. nos. 2001-233, 2001-446.
- Brenton Arboretum, Dallas Center, Iowa, US. No details available.
- Longwood Gardens, US. Acc. nos. 2000-0361, 2002-0412, 2004–0674.
- Morton Arboretum, Illinois, US. Acc. no. 124-2008.
- U S National Arboretum , Washington, D.C., US. Acc. no. 29003.

Europe

- Grange Farm Arboretum, Sutton St. James, Spalding, Lincolnshire, UK. Whips planted 2011. Acc. no. 1055.
- Netherlands Plant Collection, Ulmus: Gemeentehuis, Rading 1, Loosdrecht, gemeente Wijdemeren, planted 2016.
