= Ulmus americana 'Valley Forge' =

Elm cultivar

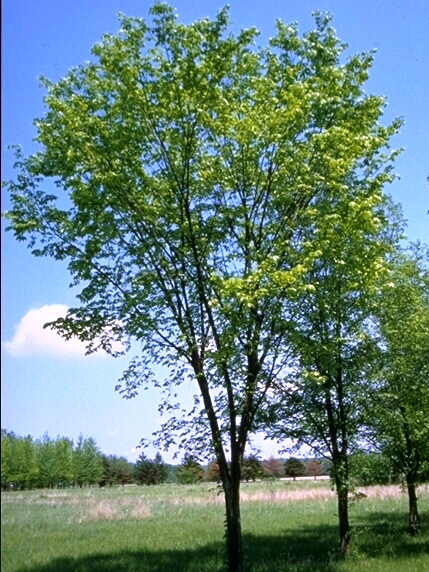
- 'Valley Forge', Delaware, Ohio.
- Species: Ulmus americana
- Cultivar: 'Valley Forge'
- Origin: Agricultural Research Service, Maryland, US

The American elm cultivar Ulmus americana 'Valley Forge' was raised by the Agricultural Research Service in Maryland. The tree was released to wholesale nurseries without patent restrictions by the U. S. National Arboretum in 1995 after proving to have a high resistance to Dutch elm disease. 'Valley Forge' proved only moderately successful in the US National Elm Trial, averaging a survival rate of 66.7% overall, owing largely to environmental factors rather than susceptibility to disease.

== Description ==
The branching is typically upright and arching, creating a broad vase-shaped structure complemented by a dense canopy of leaves. However, Michael A. Dirr, Professor of Horticulture at the University of Georgia criticized the tree's form as 'floppy'. The bark features greyish, flat-topped ridges, separated by roughly diamond-shaped fissures. The dark green leaves are large, < 17 cm (avg. 12 cm) long by < 10 cm (avg. 7.4 cm) broad, typical of the species, turning golden yellow in autumn. In an assessment at U C Davis as part of the National Elm Trial, the tree initially grew comparatively slowly, increasing in height by 0.85 m per annum, although stem development at 2.6 cm d.b.h. was near average.

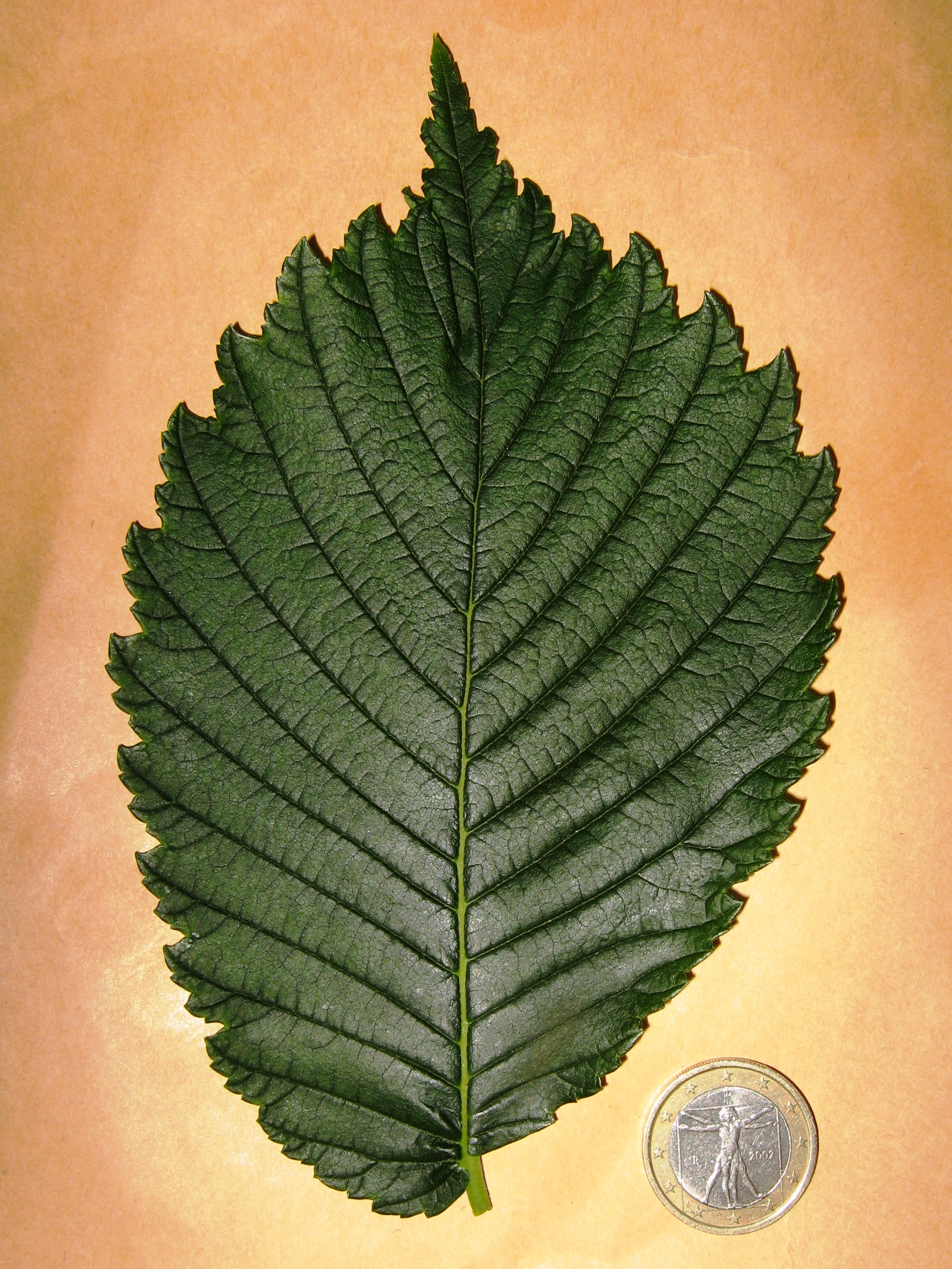
Leaf with 1 Euro coin

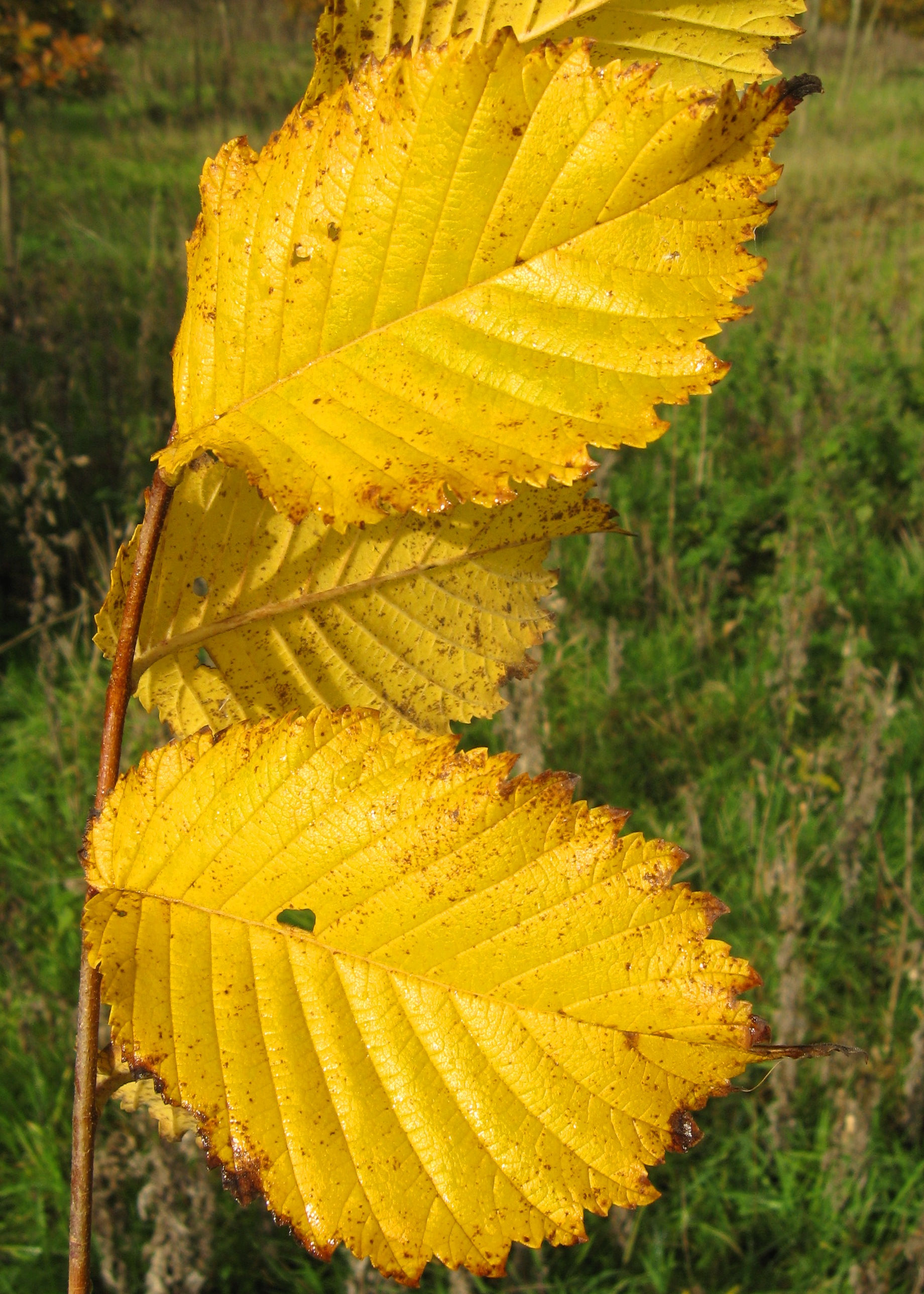
Fall color

== Pests and diseases ==
'Valley Forge' has proven the most resistant of all the American elm cultivars (although it is not immune) to Dutch elm disease. While also very resistant to the elm leaf beetle, Xanthogaleruca luteola like all other American elms it is susceptible to elm yellows. In California 'Valley Forge' has also been found to be susceptible to leaf curling aphids (Eriosoma sp.) which produce honeydew

The cultivar is only moderately preferred for feeding by the Japanese beetle Popillia japonica, but the species as a whole is the most susceptible of all the elms to verticillium wilt.

In England, the leaves of 'Valley Forge,' along with those of other American elm cultivars, remained completely free from black spot.

== Cultivation ==
All examples included in 10-year trials at Atherton, California, to evaluate replacements for Californian elms lost to disease were withdrawn after a combination of rapid growth and poor structure condemned the trees as "likely to require more maintenance than most municipalities would find acceptable". However, these verdicts may reflect in large measure the fact that they were grown in warm climates but with minimal weed competition. Trees raised in the nursery of the University of Minnesota also proved very difficult to manage, but "settled down" as they matured, adopting a more manageable form and habit. 'Valley Forge' seems to develop far fewer structural problems in temperate climates further north, where the rate of growth in any given season is much more moderate. Moreover, where grown in the countryside, competing vegetation tends to keep excessively vigorous growth in check .

Interim results from the aforementioned trial at U C Davis confirm the tree's high pruning requirement. 'Valley Forge' was introduced to the UK in 2010; it is not known to have been introduced to Australasia.

== Etymology ==
'Valley Forge' was named for the site near Philadelphia where Washington's forces endured the winter of 1777 during the War of Independence.

== Accessions ==
North America

- Arnold Arboretum, US. Acc. no. 180-2003.
- Bartlett Tree Experts , US. Acc. nos. 2001-258, 2001-259, 2001-486, 2001-491, 2003-1010.
- Brenton Arboretum, Dallas Center, Iowa, US. No details available.
- Dawes Arboretum , Newark, Ohio, US. 2 trees. No acc. details available.
- Holden Arboretum, US. Acc. nos. 2002-76, 2004–38, 2004-47.
- Morton Arboretum, US. Acc. no. 127-2008, 268-2008, 214-2012.
- Scott Arboretum, US. Acc. no. 98-110.
- Smith College, US. Acc. no. 36205.
- University of Idaho Arboretum, US. Acc. no. 2004171.
- U S National Arboretum , Washington, D.C., US. Acc. nos. 76510, 68983.

=== Europe ===
- Grange Farm Arboretum, Sutton St James, Spalding, Lincolnshire, UK. Whips planted 2011. Acc. no. 1056
- Great Fontley, Fareham, UK, Butterfly Conservation Elm trials plantation, Home Field, two whips planted 2010.
- Sir Harold Hillier Gardens, Ampfield, Hampshire, UK. One planted 2010. Acc. no. 2010.0383
- Wijdemeren city council, The Netherlands, Elm collection, two planted 2016, Rading 1, Loosdrecht.

== Nurseries ==
=== Europe ===
- Van Den Berk (UK) Ltd., , London, UK
