= Ulmus davidiana var. japonica 'JFS-Bieberich' =

Elm cultivar

- Variety: Ulmus davidiana var. japonica
- Cultivar: 'JFS-Bieberich' = Emerald Sunshine
- Origin: Sunshine Nursery, Oklahoma, US

Ulmus davidiana var. japonica 'JFS-Bieberich' (sold as Emerald Sunshine) is a Japanese Elm cultivar that was raised by the Sunshine Nursery, Oklahoma, from seed collected in China by proprietor Steve Bieberich. Emerald Sunshine proved only moderately successful in the US National Elm Trial, averaging a survival rate of 70% overall.

== Description ==
Emerald Sunshine attains a height of 9 m and develops a neat vase shape, the crown < 7.5 m in width borne by a stout stem. The cultivar has thick, deep-green leaves turning dull yellow in the fall. Trees planted as part of the National Elm Trial at the Bowley Plant Science Teaching Center, U C Davis, in northern California grew comparatively slowly, increasing in height by 1 m and d.b.h. by 1.6 cm per annum. The tree was summarized by Michael Dirr, Professor of Horticulture at the University of Georgia as 'impressive' .

== Pests and diseases ==
Emerald Sunshine is resistant to Dutch elm disease and elm yellows (Phloem necrosis). Foliage of trees under assessment at the aforementioned National elm trial site at U C Davis suffered minimal damage caused by the elm leaf beetle Xanthogaleruca luteola, whilst damage caused by Japanese beetle in trials at the University of Kentucky was found to be slight, owing to the dense pubescence on the underside of the leaves.

== Cultivation ==
Emerald Sunshine is tolerant of high pH levels and soil compaction; it is also very resistant to desiccating winds. The species does not sucker from roots.

In the US, a specimen stands by the NE corner Gilkey Hall on the Oregon State University campus. The cultivar is represented in Europe by five young grafted trees at the Noordplant nursery, Glimmen, The Netherlands; it is not known to have been introduced to Australasia.

== Accessions ==
=== North America ===
- University of Idaho Arboretum, US. Acc. no. 2006033
- Morton Arboretum, Lisle, Illinois.

== Nurseries ==
North America

- J. Frank Schmidt & Son Co., Boring, Oregon, US.

== Synonymy ==
- Ulmus propinqua C. K. Schneid. 'JFS-Bieberich' = Emerald Sunshine

== Etymology ==
Named 'JFS' for the J. Frank Schmidt nursery, Oregon, and 'Bieberich' for the proprietor of the Sunshine Nursery in Oklahoma.
