= Ulmus americana 'Beaverlodge' =

Elm cultivar

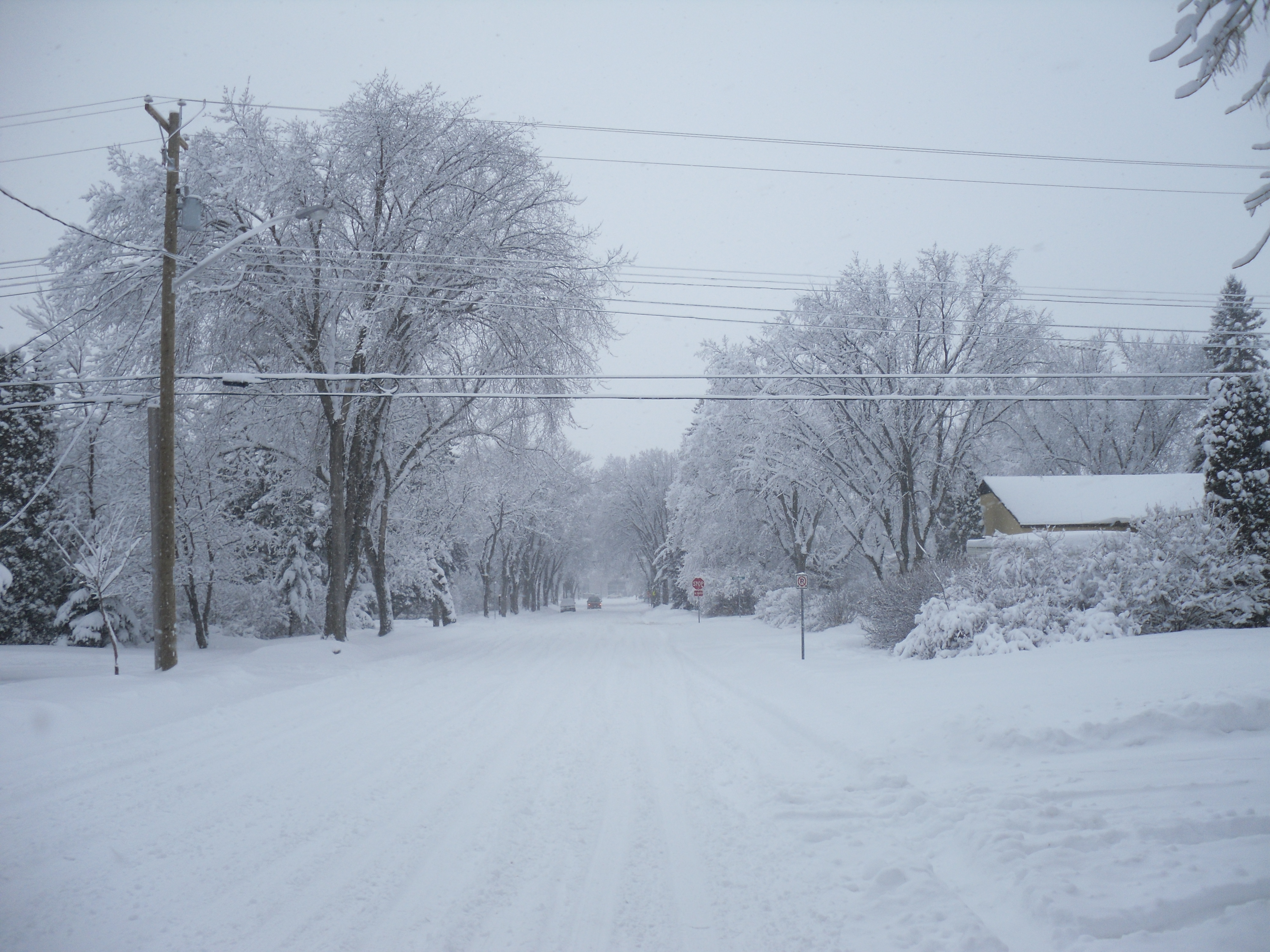
- 'Beaverlodge' in Elm Avenue, Steinbach, Manitoba; planted 1955 (2012)
- Species: Ulmus americana
- Cultivar: 'Beaverlodge'
- Origin: Morden, Manitoba, Canada

The American elm cultivar Ulmus americana 'Beaverlodge' was selected as a seedling in 1925 at the Beaverlodge Experimental Farm, Morden, Manitoba, part of the Lacombe Research Centre, Alberta, for its hardiness and vigour, and was released in 1954.

== Description ==
'Beaverlodge' had an upright, moderately spreading canopy. It was fast-growing and recommended for avenue planting.

== Cultivation ==
It is not known whether the tree remains in cultivation in North America or beyond.

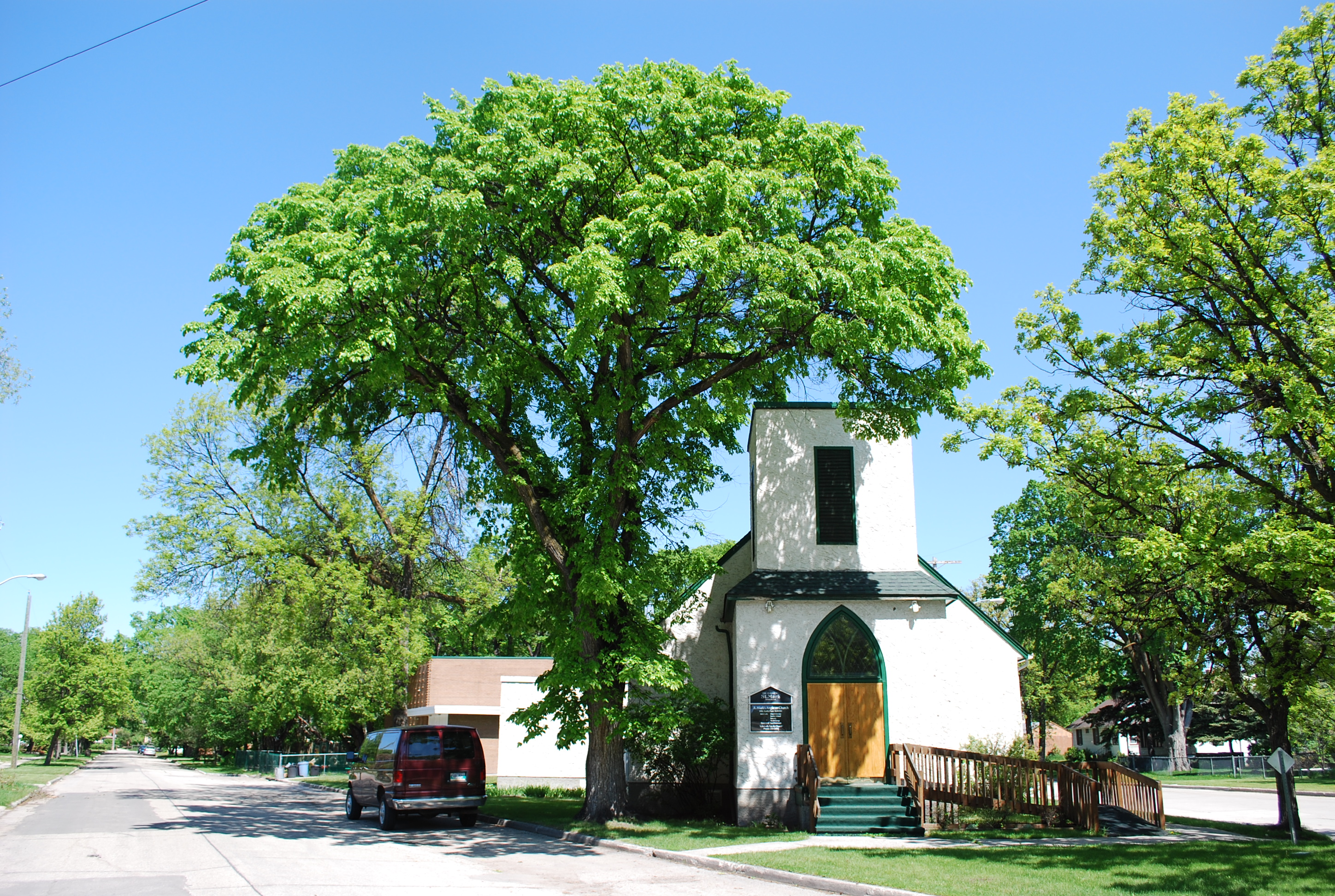
Putative 'Beaverlodge' by St Mark's Anglican church, Mager Drive West, Winnipeg (2009), felled 2020

== Pests and diseases ==
No specific information is available, but the species as a whole is highly susceptible to Dutch elm disease and elm yellows. It is also moderately preferred for feeding and reproduction by the adult elm leaf beetle Xanthogaleruca luteola, and highly preferred for feeding by the Japanese beetle Popillia japonica in the United States. U. americana is also the most susceptible of all the elms to verticillium wilt.

== Etymology ==
The tree is named for the Beaverlodge Experimental Farm.
