= Ulmus americana 'Lewis & Clark' =

Elm cultivar

Ulmus americana 'Lewis & Clark' = Prairie Expedition
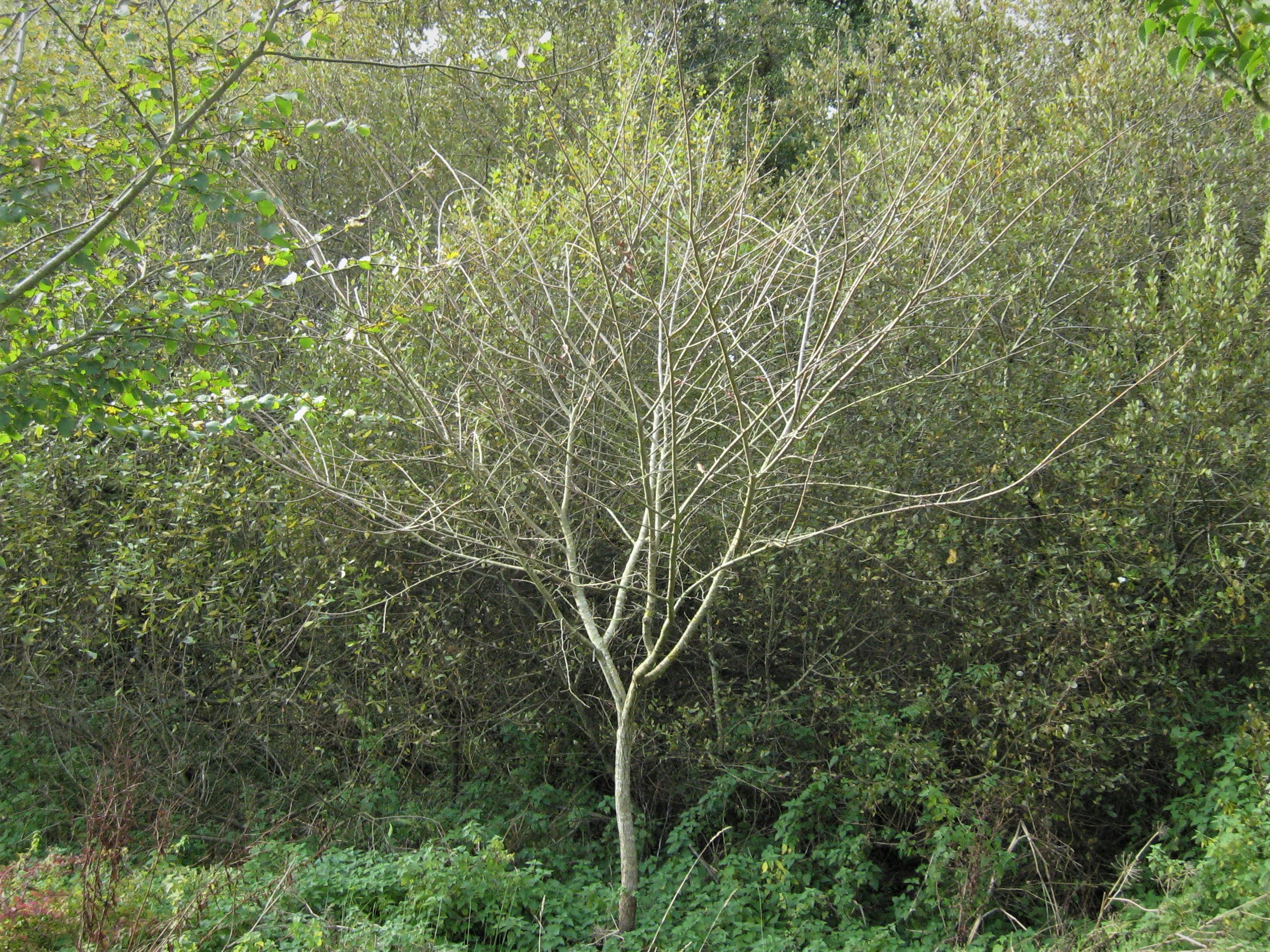
- 'Lewis & Clark', Boarhunt, UK, age 20 yrs
- Species: Ulmus americana
- Cultivar: 'Lewis & Clark'
- Marketing names: Prairie Expedition
- Origin: North Dakota State University Research Foundation, US

The American elm cultivar Ulmus americana 'Lewis & Clark' (trade name Prairie Expedition) is a development from the North Dakota State University (NDSU) Research Foundation breeding programme, released in 2004 to commemorate the 200th anniversary of the eponymous expedition. The cultivar was cloned from a tree discovered in 1994 along the Wild Rice River south west of Fargo, North Dakota, where all those around it had succumbed to Dutch elm disease; the tree remains in perfect health (2008). Prairie Expedition proved only moderately successful in the US National Elm Trial, averaging a survival rate of 62.6% overall, potentially due to environmental factors rather than susceptibility to Dutch elm disease. Nevertheless, Prairie Expedition is considered the hardiest of the American elm cultivars, able to survive in Zone 3 (-40 to -34 Celsius).

Prairie Expedition was introduced to the UK in 2008 by Hampshire & Isle of Wight Branch, Butterfly Conservation, as part of an assessment of DED-resistant cultivars as potential hosts of the endangered White-letter Hairstreak.

== Description ==
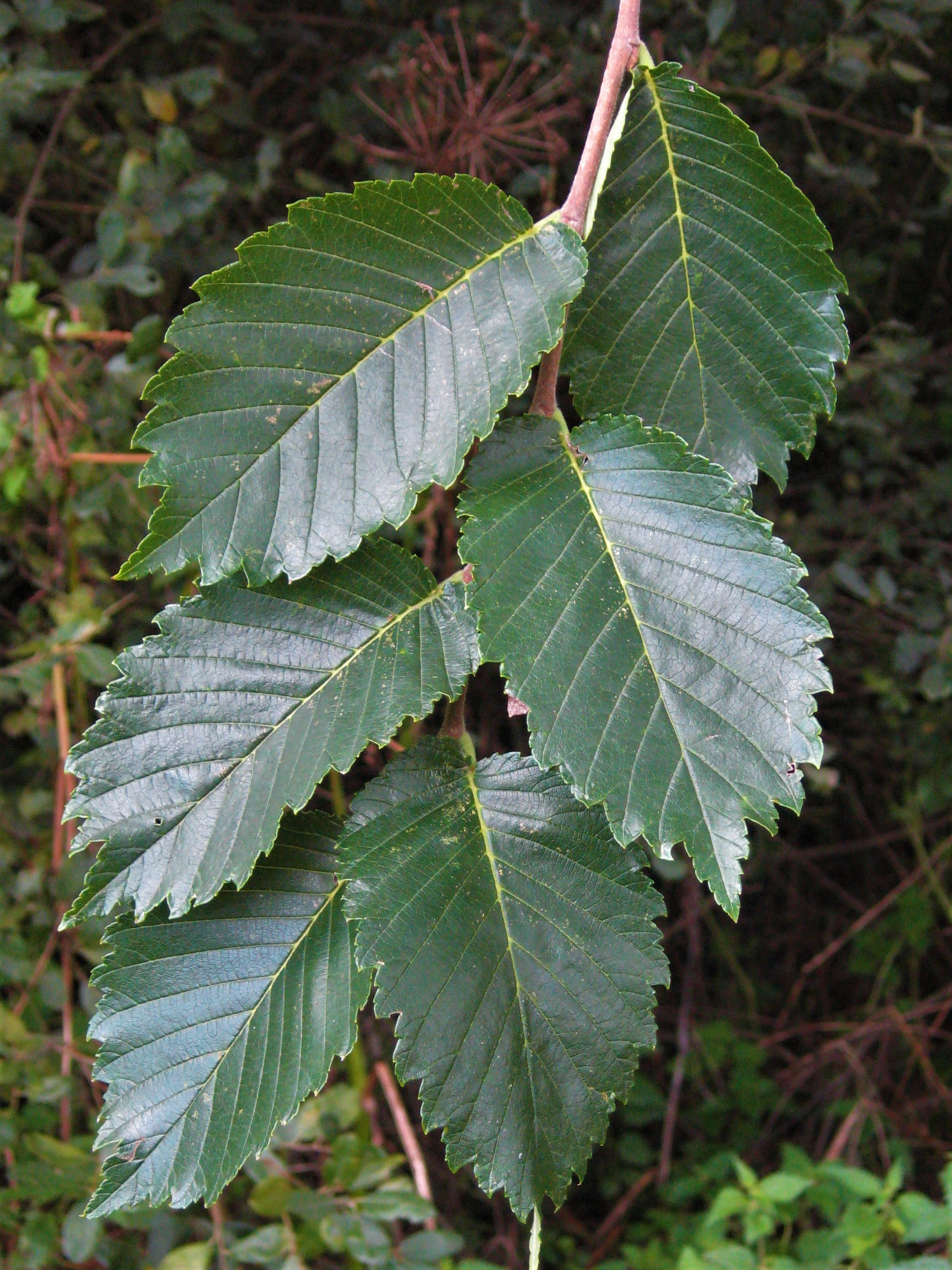
Foliage, midsummer

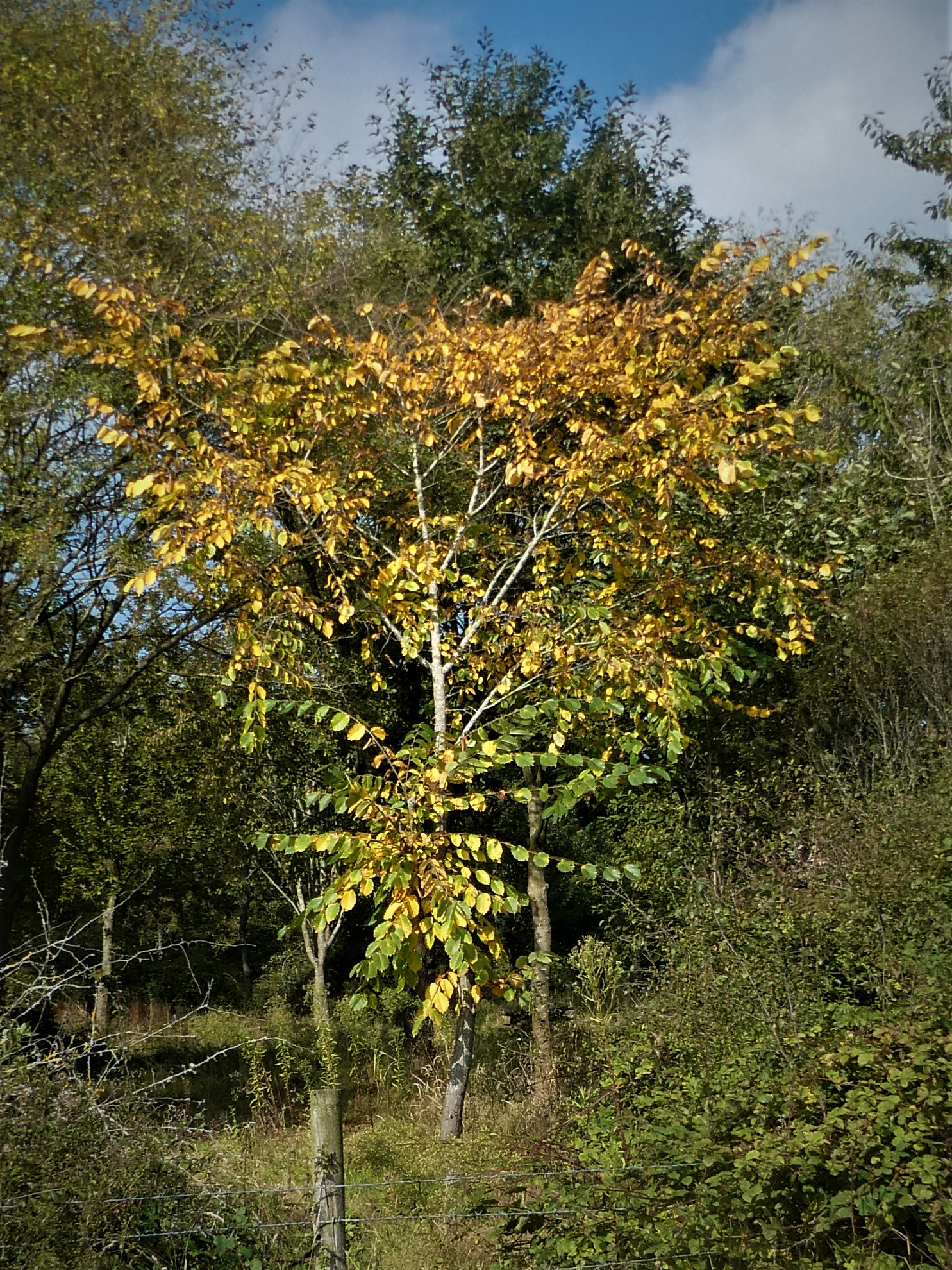
Foliage, October

Prairie Expedition is distinguished in maturity by its broad umbrella crown and dark green foliage. However, the tree was judged to have little ornamental value in the National Elm Trial . The clone grows moderately quickly, averaging an increase of > 1 m in height per annum when young, reaching a height of <17 m in 25 to 30 years. The leaves are < 13 cm in length by 9 cm broad, coarsely-toothed, and with a 4 mm petiole.

== Pests and diseases ==
Possession of an innate resistance to Dutch elm disease was suggested after inoculation with the causal fungus at the NDSU, however replication of the tests is considered too limited to be conclusive. No other specific information available, but the species as a whole is highly susceptible to elm yellows; it is also moderately preferred for feeding and reproduction by the adult elm leaf beetle Xanthogaleruca luteola, and highly preferred for feeding by the Japanese beetle Popillia japonica in the United States. U. americana is also the most susceptible of all the elms to verticillium wilt.

== Cultivation ==
Prairie Expedition has been included in the National Elm Trial coordinated by Colorado State University. The tree is in commerce in the US, and was introduced to the UK from Canada by Butterfly Conservation in 2008, and thence to the Netherlands in 2010. Two trees were planted in 2016 in Rading 1, Loosdrecht, as part of Wijdemeren City Council's elm collection.

== Etymology ==
The tree is named for the Lewis and Clark Expedition of 1804.

== Accessions ==
=== North America ===
- North Dakota State University, US. No details known.

=== Europe ===
- Great Fontley, Fareham, UK, Butterfly Conservation Elm trials plantation, Home Field. One tree planted 2008, d.b.h. 9.5 cm in 2020

== Nurseries ==
=== North America ===
- Bylands Nurseries Ltd., Kelowna, British Columbia, Canada.
- Patmore Nursery, Brandon, Manitoba, Canada.
- Sester Farms, Gresham, Oregon, US.
- Sun Valley Garden Centre, Eden Prairie, Minnesota, US.
