= National Elm Trial =

American horticultural program

The National Elm Trial was an American volunteer effort to evaluate a range of newly developed elm cultivars as replacements for elms destroyed by Dutch elm disease. The Colorado State University College of Agricultural Sciences coordinated the trial.

The trial began in 2005, but was restricted to elm cultivars commercially available in the United States, unlike the trial conducted by Iowa State University in the 1970s which included the most recent European developments. The trial was conducted for 10 years, with annual assessments of each tree for height, diameter, crown characteristics, and fall color, as well as response to vascular diseases, canker diseases, foliar diseases, insect infestations, bark beetle infestations, and abiotic damages. Stated goals of the trial were as follows:

- Determine the growth and horticultural performance of commercially available elm cultivars resistant to Dutch elm disease in various climate regimes in the United States.
- Determine the relative disease, insect, and abiotic stress tolerance of these cultivars.
- Promote the propagation and use of elms through local, regional, and national reporting of the trial results to wholesale tree propagators and growers, retail nursery and garden center operators, landscaper designers, arborists, and the general public.

Based on the trial's final ratings, the preferred cultivars of the American elm (Ulmus americana) are ‘New Harmony’ and ‘Princeton’. The preferred cultivars of Asian elms are the Morton Arboretum introductions and ‘New Horizon’.

== List of cultivars included in the trial ==
- American elm Ulmus americana cultivars: 'Valley Forge', 'New Harmony', 'Princeton', 'Lewis & Clark' (Prairie Expedition), 'Jefferson' (provided no data).
- Chinese elm Ulmus parvifolia cultivars: BSNUPF (Everclear), 'Emer I' (Athena), 'Emer II' (Allee).
- Japanese Elm Ulmus davidiana var. japonica cultivars: 'JFS - Bieberich' (Emerald Sunshine), 'Prospector'.
- Hybrid elm cultivars: 'Frontier', 'Homestead', 'Morton' (Accolade), 'Morton Glossy' (Triumph), 'Morton Plainsman' (Vanguard), 'Morton Red Tip' (Danada Charm), 'Morton Stalwart' (Commendation), 'New Horizon', 'Patriot', 'Pioneer'.

== See also ==
- List of elm cultivars, hybrids and hybrid cultivars
