= Anthony Tyznik =

Anthony "Tony" Tyznik (born in 1925; died on 19 November 2016 aged 91) was a landscape architect. Tyznik began his career in landscape architecture after graduating from the University of Wisconsin where he graduated with a degree in landscape architecture. He worked as a landscape architect and artist at the Morton Arboretum for over 40 years. He has also designed the Carton Garden, which is featured in the Smithsonian. Tyznik created the master plan for the Brenton Arboretum.
