= ArbNet =

Arboretum accreditation and networking program

ArbNet is an international arboretum accreditation and networking program. The ArbNet program is supported and coordinated through The Morton Arboretum, with partners American Public Gardens Association and Botanic Gardens Conservation International. ArbNet was developed to set industry standards, foster partnerships and collaborations, and provide guidelines for professional development for tree-focused gardens. Globally, over 150 arboreta have been accredited since 2011. There are four different levels of accreditation depending on the arboretum's stage of development, capacity, and potential for scientific and conservation-related collaboration. All levels require a strategic plan, a focus on woody species, public access, and participation in the ArbNet community. Level I arboreta achieve a basic level of accreditation whereas Level IV arboreta reach the highest level of arboretum standards.
