= Canker-worm =

Canker-worm may refer to following inchworms:

- Alsophila pometaria, the fall cankerworm
- Paleacrita vernata, the spring cankerworm
