= Galena, Ohio =

- Village
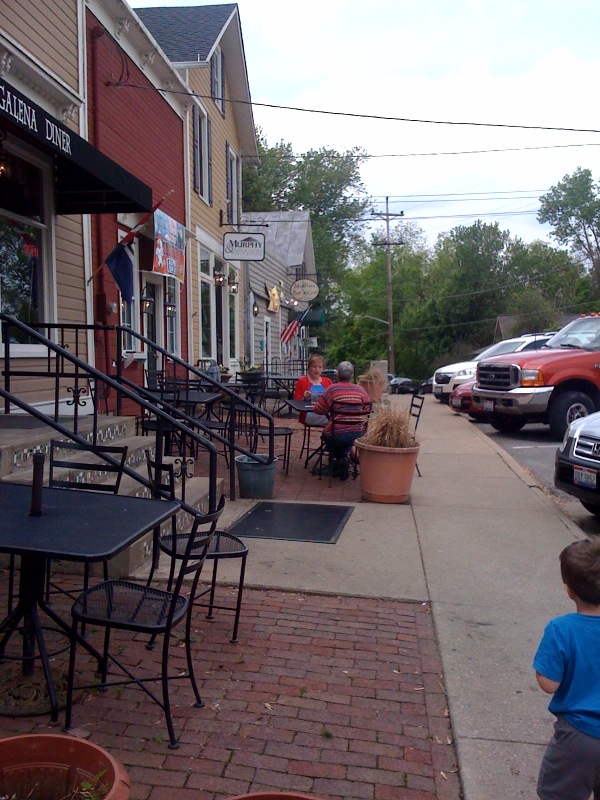
- Commercial buildings on the south side of the main square

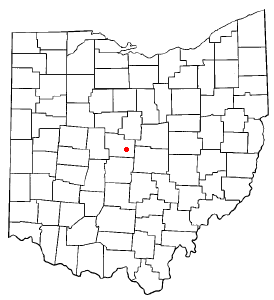
- Location of Galena, Ohio

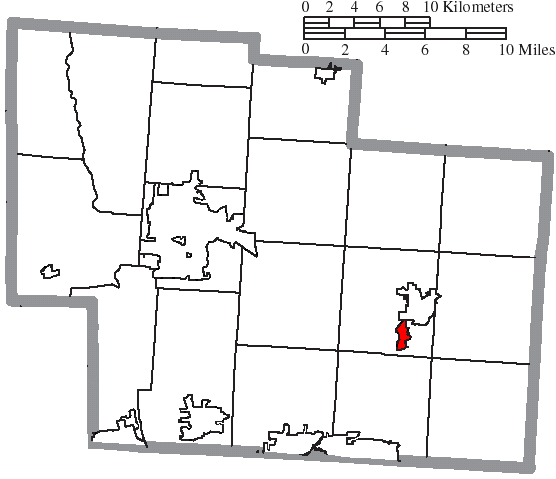
- Location of Galena in Delaware County
- Coordinates: 40°13′14″N 82°52′34″W
- Country: United States
- State: Ohio
- County: Delaware
- Township: Berkshire

Area
  - Total: 1.83 sq mi (4.74 km^{2})
  - Land: 1.73 sq mi (4.48 km^{2})
  - Water: 0.10 sq mi (0.27 km^{2})
- Elevation: 929 ft (283 m)

Population (2020)
  - Total: 924
  - Estimate (2023): 1,018
  - Density: 534.4/sq mi (206.34/km^{2})
- Time zone: UTC-5 (Eastern (EST))
  - Summer (DST): UTC-4 (EDT)
- ZIP code: 43021
- Area codes: 740, 220
- FIPS code: 39-29148
- GNIS feature ID: 2398937
- Website: https://galenaohio.gov/

Galena is a village in Delaware County, Ohio, United States. The population was 924 at the 2020 United States census.

== History ==
Galena was originally called Zoar, and under the latter name was platted in 1816. A post office named Galena has been in operation since 1834.

== Geography ==
According to the United States Census Bureau, the village has a total area of 1.70 square miles (4.40 km^{2}), of which 1.60 square miles (4.14 km^{2}) is land and 0.10 square miles (0.26 km^{2}) is water.

== Demographics ==
Historical population
Census	Pop.	Note	%±
1880	250		—
1930	376		—
1940	355		−5.6%
1950	424		19.4%
1960	411		−3.1%
1970	361		−12.2%
1980	358		−0.8%
1990	361		0.8%
2000	305		−15.5%
2010	653		114.1%
2020	924		41.5%
2023 (est.)	1,018	▲	10.2%
U.S. Decennial Census

=== 2010 census ===
As of the 2010 census, there were 653 people, 214 households, and 172 families living in the village. The population density was 408.1 inhabitants per square mile (157.6/km^{2}). There were 237 housing units at an average density of 148.1 per square mile (57.2/km^{2}). The racial makeup of the village was 90.8% White, 2.6% African American, 0.5% Native American, 3.4% Asian, 0.5% Pacific Islander, 1.2% from other races, and 1.1% from two or more races. Hispanic or Latino of any race were 2.3% of the population.

There were 214 households, of which 45.8% had children under the age of 18 living with them, 69.2% were married couples living together, 7.0% had a female householder with no husband present, 4.2% had a male householder with no wife present, and 19.6% were non-families. 15.4% of all households were made up of individuals, and 6.1% had someone living alone who was 65 years of age or older. The average household size was 3.05 and the average family size was 3.38.

The median age in the village was 35.2 years. 30.9% of residents were under the age of 18; 5.6% were between the ages of 18 and 24; 29.7% were from 25 to 44; 24.6% were from 45 to 64; and 9.2% were 65 years of age or older. The sex makeup of the village was 49.5% male and 50.5% female.

=== 2000 census ===
As of the 2000 census, there were 305 people, 122 households, and 89 families living in the village. The population density was 509.8 inhabitants per square mile (196.8/km^{2}). There were 132 housing units at an average density of 220.6 per square mile (85.2/km^{2}). The racial makeup of the village was 97.70% White, 0.66% Native American, and 1.64% from two or more races. Hispanic or Latino of any race were 1.64% of the population.

There were 122 households, out of which 32.0% had children under the age of 18 living with them, 61.5% were married couples living together, 5.7% had a female householder with no husband present, and 27.0% were non-families. 25.4% of all households were made up of individuals, and 9.8% had someone living alone who was 65 years of age or older. The average household size was 2.50 and the average family size was 2.97.

In the village, the population was spread out, with 23.6% under the age of 18, 7.2% from 18 to 24, 29.8% from 25 to 44, 23.6% from 45 to 64, and 15.7% who were 65 years of age or older. The median age was 39 years. For every 100 females there were 102.0 males. For every 100 females age 18 and over, there were 100.9 males.

The median income for a household in the village was $46,250, and the median income for a family was $49,500. Males had a median income of $38,750 versus $27,250 for females. The per capita income for the village was $20,163. About 4.8% of families and 9.6% of the population were below the poverty line, including 22.1% of those under the age of 18 and none of those 65 or over.

== Public services ==
Emergency medical services in Galena are provided by the Delaware County EMS.
