= LT50 =

LT50 is the median Lethal Time (time until death) after exposure of an organism to a toxic substance or stressful condition. LT50 is commonly used in toxicology studies to quantify amount of a stressor necessary to kill an organism. LT50 can be used in conjunction with EC50 (median Exposure Concentration) for even more precise quantification.

== See also ==
- Acute toxicity
- Viability assay
