= Brenton Arboretum =

Arboretum and public garden in Dallas Center, Iowa

Coordinates: 41.66°N 93.99°W

The Brenton Arboretum
- Interactive map of The Brenton Arboretum
- Type: Arboretum
- Motto: Inspiring joy through the beauty and knowledge of the natural world of trees.
- Location: 25141 260th Street, Dallas Center, Iowa 50063
- Nearest city: Des Moines, Iowa
- Area: 140 acres (57 ha)
- Authorized: 1997
- Founder: Buz Brenton
- Designer: Anthony Tyznik
- Open: Open daily 9:00 am to sunset
- Status: Level III accreditation from the ArbNet network of arboreta
- Paths: 5.42 miles
- Habitats: Prairie
- Plants: 2,500
- Species: 500 species, hybrids and cultivars
- Collections: 10
- Website: Official website

The Brenton Arboretum is a 141-acre arboretum and public garden in Dallas Center, Iowa, United States, established in 1997. The arboretum displays 175 native Iowa trees and shrubs suitable to the site, as well as many other tree species which can grow in central Iowa. The non-profit arboretum is open to the public from 9 am to sunset on Tuesday through Sunday, featuring a collection of over 2,600 trees and shrubs on display.

The arboretum was founded by Sue and J.C. (Buz) Brenton and their children, on land which was part of the original Home Farm acquired by Dr. James Brenton and his son, William Henry, soon after they arrived from Indiana in 1853 by covered wagon. Its first trees were planted in 1997. The master plan was created by Anthony Tyznik of Batavia, Illinois, who for many years was the landscape architect for the Morton Arboretum in Chicago, Illinois.

The arboretum has a lake, pond, wetlands, several streams, walking paths, bridges, prairies, wildflowers and a small library. Natural prairie was established to restore the land to a pre-agricultural setting.

== See also ==
- List of botanical gardens in the United States
