= Elm yellows =

Bacterial disease of elm trees

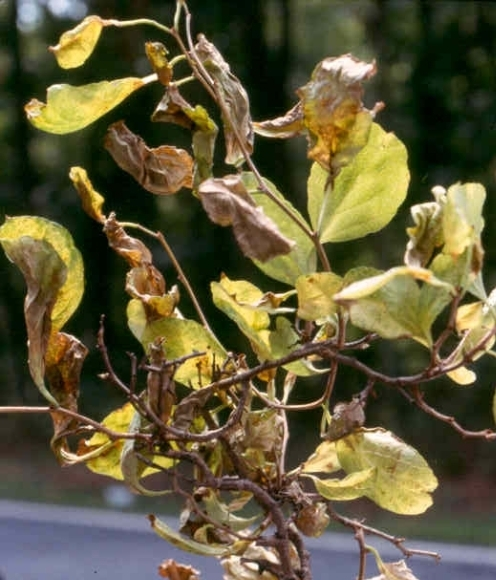
- Symptoms of elm phloem necrosis
- Causal agents: Phytoplasmas
- Hosts: Elms
- Vectors: Leafhoppers (Scaphoideus luteolus, Philaenus spurarius, Allygus atomarius)
- Distribution: Eastern United States and southern Ontario, Canada
- Treatment: Tetracycline has been shown to slow down the disease

Elm yellows is a plant disease of elm trees that is spread by leafhoppers or by root grafts. Elm yellows, also known as elm phloem necrosis, is very aggressive, with no known cure. Elm yellows occurs in the eastern United States, and southern Ontario in Canada. It is caused by phytoplasmas which infect the phloem (inner bark) of the tree. Similar phytoplasmas, also known confusingly as 'Elm yellows', also occur in Europe. Infection and death of the phloem effectively girdles the tree and stops the flow of water and nutrients. The disease affects both wild-growing and cultivated trees.

== Importance ==
Elms are very important to the American landscape, prized for their unique shade characteristics. Most native elms are susceptible to elm yellows and there are few resistant cultivars. Large, healthy, landscaped elm trees can easily be worth thousands of dollars.

Penn State University is home to one of the oldest and largest elm stands in the country. Penn State has been battling Dutch elm disease for many decades, and the recent introduction of elm yellows into the Penn State campus poses many threats. A tree near the university president’s house had to be removed and numerous trees in State College, Pa have died or have been removed due to elm yellows.

Elm malls across the US are at risk of being destroyed by elm yellows. Cornell University, for example, had a large elm collection which was being managed for Dutch elm disease, much like Penn State, but once elm yellows had spread to the campus, all of the elms were destroyed within a matter of years.

== Transmission ==
In North America the disease is transmitted from infected to healthy trees by the whitebanded elm leafhopper (Scaphoideus luteolus Van Duzee), the meadow spittlebug (Philaenus spurarius) and by another leafhopper (Allygus atomarius), although other insects are also suspected of being vectors. Transportation of nursery trees is another way for elm yellows to be spread over long distances. As leafhoppers move very slowly so movement of elm yellows has been slow.

== Symptoms ==
When an elm is infected with elm yellows, the root hairs die. The phytoplasma infection then moves up the bark and infects the phloem, depriving the tree of nutrients. Death of the phloem essentially strangles the tree. As the phloem is infected, it will change color and take on a wintergreen smell, similar to that of black birch or birch beer.

The crown, top of the tree turns yellow all at once, it can occur from July till September, when the leafhoppers are active. It turns yellow from a lack of nutrients to the top of the tree.

== Control ==
Aggressive control is needed if trees show symptoms of being infected. Time is of the essence since nearby trees may already be infected. Removal and destruction of the infected tree is the first step, followed by trenching around the next two rows of trees near it to isolate infection. Spraying trees with insecticide will also help reduce the chances of transmission by leafhopper. Injecting trees with tetracycline antibiotics has been shown to slow the progress of elm yellows.

Tetracycline inhibits protein synthesis by preventing tRNA from attaching to the Ribosome. Phytoplasma bacteria do not have a Cell wall Since Elm yellows and other phytoplasma do not have cell walls, most antibiotics will not be effective, this is why tetracycline and antibiotics that target internal functions of the cell are needed.

== See also ==
- Plant pathology
