= Dawes Arboretum =

Arboretum in Newark, Ohio

The Dawes Arboretum
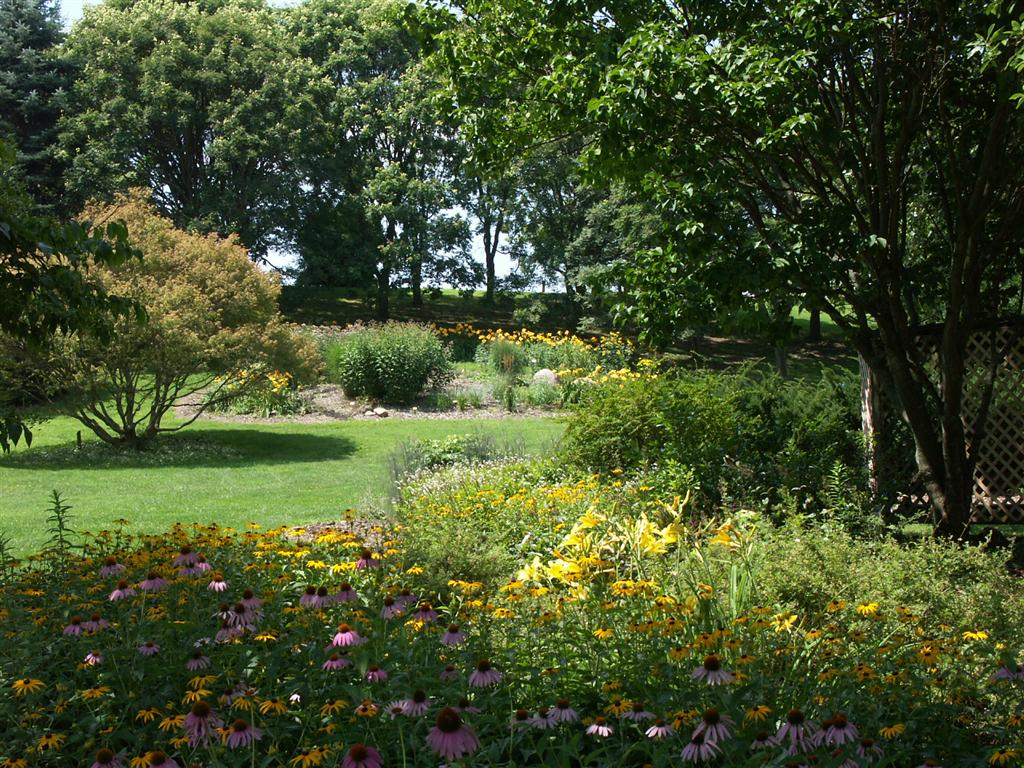
- The All Seasons Garden
- Interactive map of The Dawes Arboretum
- Location: Newark, Ohio
- Coordinates: 39°58′44″N 82°25′01″W
- Area: 1,910 acres (7.7 km^{2})
- Created: June 1, 1929
- Visitors: 267,000
- Open: All year (except New Year's Day, Thanksgiving and Christmas)
- Plants: 16,828
- Website: www.dawesarb.org

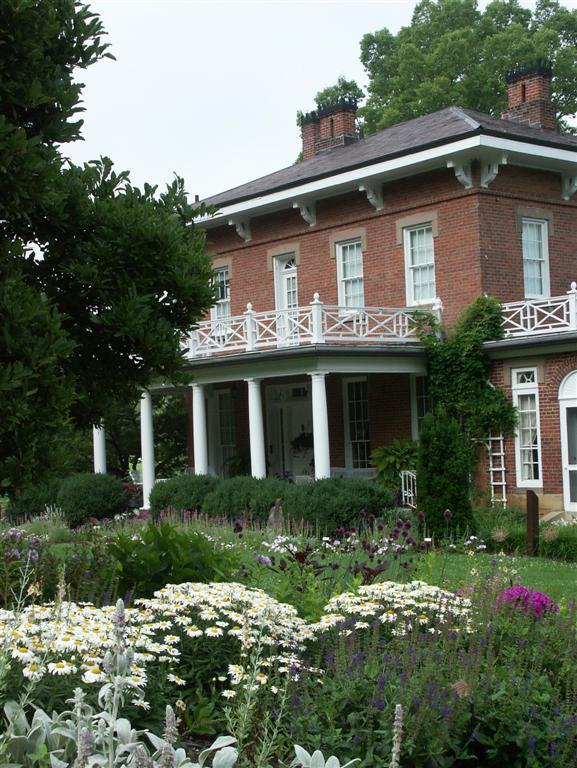
The Daweswood House in Summer

The Dawes Arboretum is a nonprofit arboretum located in Newark, Ohio. The site includes nearly 1,910 acres (7.7 km^{2}) of plant collections, gardens and natural areas. The site includes approximately 12 miles (19 km) of hiking trails and roadways for a four-mile (6 km) driving tour.

== History ==
Beman Dawes was born in 1870 and grew up in Marietta, Ohio. His father ran a lumber business and also served one term as a U.S. Representative. Bertie Burr was born in 1872 in Lincoln, Nebraska. Her father served as mayor of Lincoln and as a U.S. Senator. The two married in 1894 and eventually had five children.

Around 1917, the couple bought a 140-acre farm in Licking Township and dubbed it "Daweswood." The farm served as a retreat for the family, who also had a home in Columbus, and a place to nurture trees and plant specimens collected from around the world. The arboretum had doubled in size by the time it was officially founded in 1929. Beman and Bertie Dawes created the foundation "to encourage the planting of forest and ornamental trees … to give pleasure to the public and education to the youth."

Dawes Arboretum was listed on the National Register of Historic Places in 2016. Around 270,000 visitors a year come to the park.

Beginning in 2019, Dawes Arboretum now charges an admission fee, to visitors whom are non-members of the arboretum, for the first time in the organization's history.

== Features ==
The Dawes Arboretum's features nearly 16,000 living trees, shrubs, flowers and other plants, as well as the Daweswood House Museum, which features Dawes family memorabilia and antiques.

The grounds include a number of gardens and natural areas. The Japanese Garden, designed by landscape architect Dr. Makoto Nakamura in 1963, includes a reflecting pond and meditation area.

The arboretum features one of the northernmost native bald-cypress swamps in North America, which visitors can walk through on a boardwalk. Jefferson salamander and spotted salamanders are present in the swamp from late winter through spring.

The Dutch Fork Wetlands is a 70-acre wetland and grassland ecosystem located on the arboretum grounds. The original wetlands and habitats disappeared and changed due to years of agriculture practice. The area was restored into a diverse ecosystem, and mammals, birds and insects make the wetlands their home. Visitors either explore the wetlands alone or take a guided tour.

== Plant collections ==
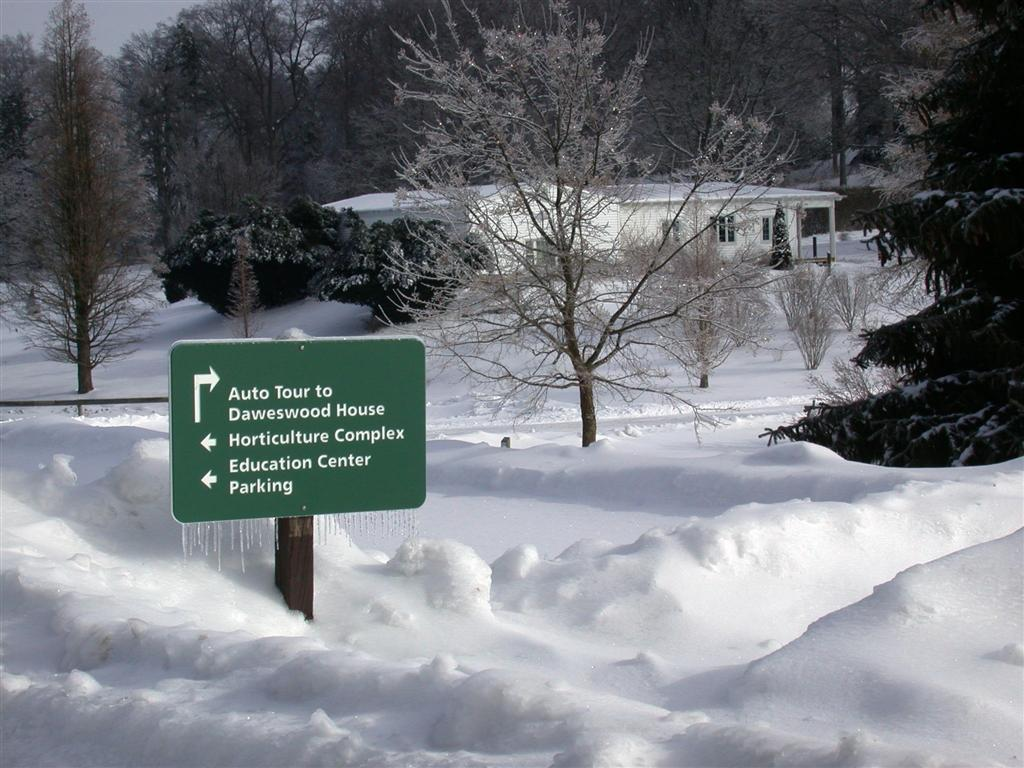
The Arboretum in Winter

The collection includes buckeye, chestnut, conifer, holly and oak specimens, as well as three nationally accredited tree collections, as recognized by the Plant Collections Network:

- Acer multisite (maples)
- Aesculus (buckeyes and horse-chestnuts)
- Hamamelis (witch-hazel)
- Metasequoia glyptostroboides (dawn redwood)

The arboretum has hosted more than 100 tree dedications since 1927. Among the Ohioans who have trees dedicated to them on the grounds are athlete Jesse Owens, astronaut John Glenn, inventors Wilbur Wright and Orville Wright, and author Julie Zickefoose.

== See also ==
- List of botanical gardens in the United States
- National Register of Historic Places listings in Licking County, Ohio
