= Morton Arboretum =

Botanical garden in Lisle, Illinois, US

The Morton Arboretum
- The Champion of Trees
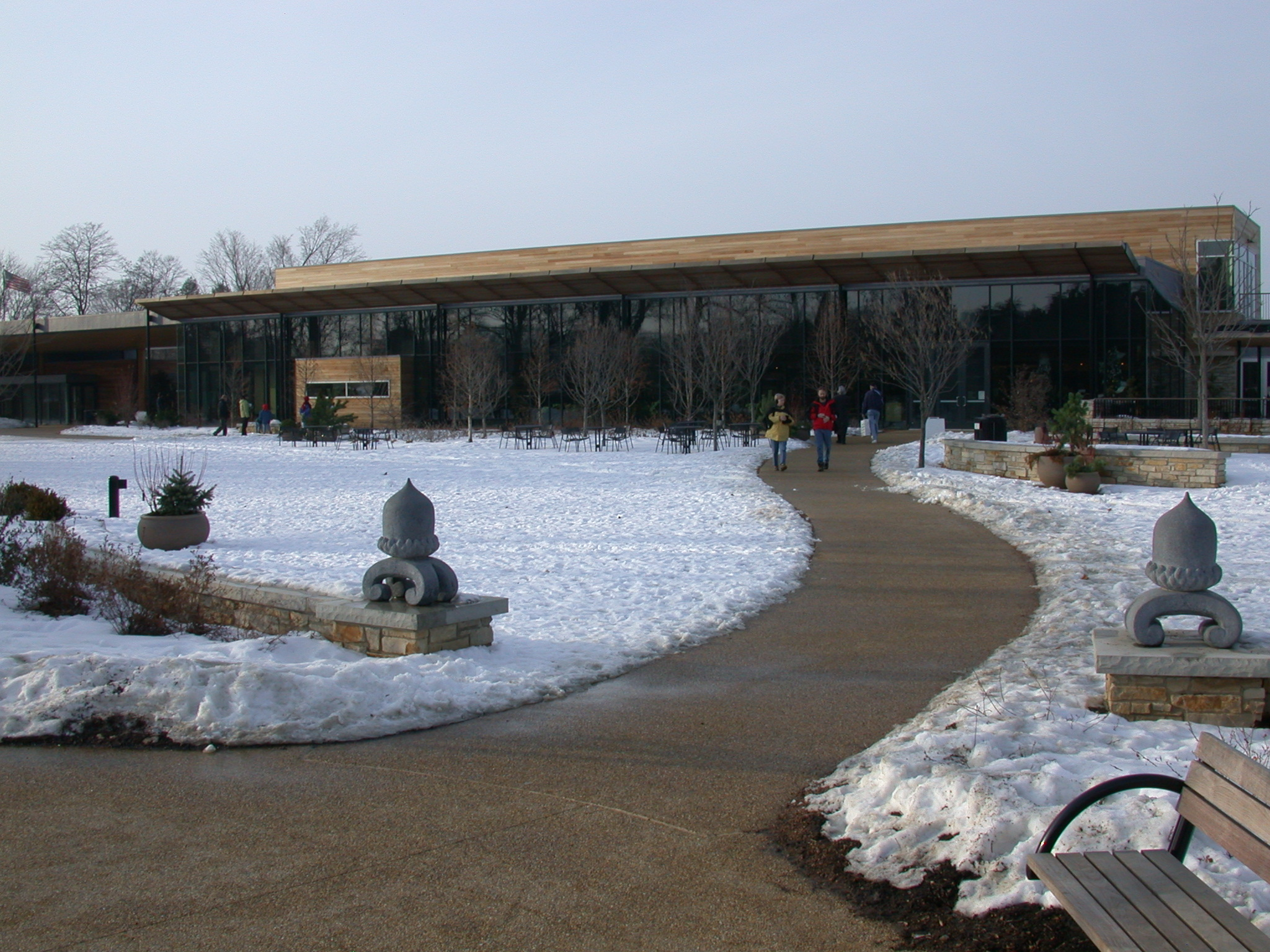
- The visitor center
- Interactive map of The Morton Arboretum
- Type: Arboretum
- Location: 4100 Illinois Route 53, Lisle, Illinois
- Coordinates: 41°48′58″N 88°04′13″W
- Area: 1,700 acres (690 ha)
- Established: Dec 14, 1922; 103 years ago
- Founder: Joy Morton, founder Morton Salt
- Open: 365 days a year
- Hiking trails: 16 miles
- Plants: 222,000
- Species: 4,100 types of trees
- Budget: $31.3M
- Website: mortonarb.org

The Morton Arboretum, in Lisle, Illinois, United States, is a public botanical garden and outdoor museum of living trees with a library, herbarium, and program in tree research through its Center for Tree Science. Its grounds, covering 1,700 acres (6.9 square kilometers), include cataloged collections of trees and other living plants, gardens, and restored areas, among which is a restored tallgrass prairie. The living collections include more than 4,100 different plant species. There are more than 200,000 cataloged plants.

As a place for outdoor recreation, the arboretum has 16 miles of hiking trails, nine miles of roadways for driving and bicycling, a 4-acre (16,000 m^{2}) interactive children's garden and a 1-acre (4,000 m^{2}) maze.

The Schulenberg Prairie at the arboretum was one of the earliest prairie restoration projects in the Midwest, begun in 1962. It is one of the largest restored prairies in the Chicago suburban area.

Three dozen cuttings from the old bur oak that had been in Lincoln Park Zoo have been grafted onto rootstocks at the arboretum.

The arboretum offers a nature-centered education program for children, families, school groups, scouts, and adults, including tree and restoration professionals. The Natural Areas Conservation Training (N-ACT) Program offers classroom and online courses in ecological restoration techniques. The arboretum also offers credit courses through the Associated Colleges of the Chicago Area, a regional consortium.

The International Union for Conservation of Nature (IUCN) designated the Morton Arboretum as its Center for Species Survival: Trees, to study and promote the conservation and restoration of global tree ecosystems and strategies for species survival.

== History ==
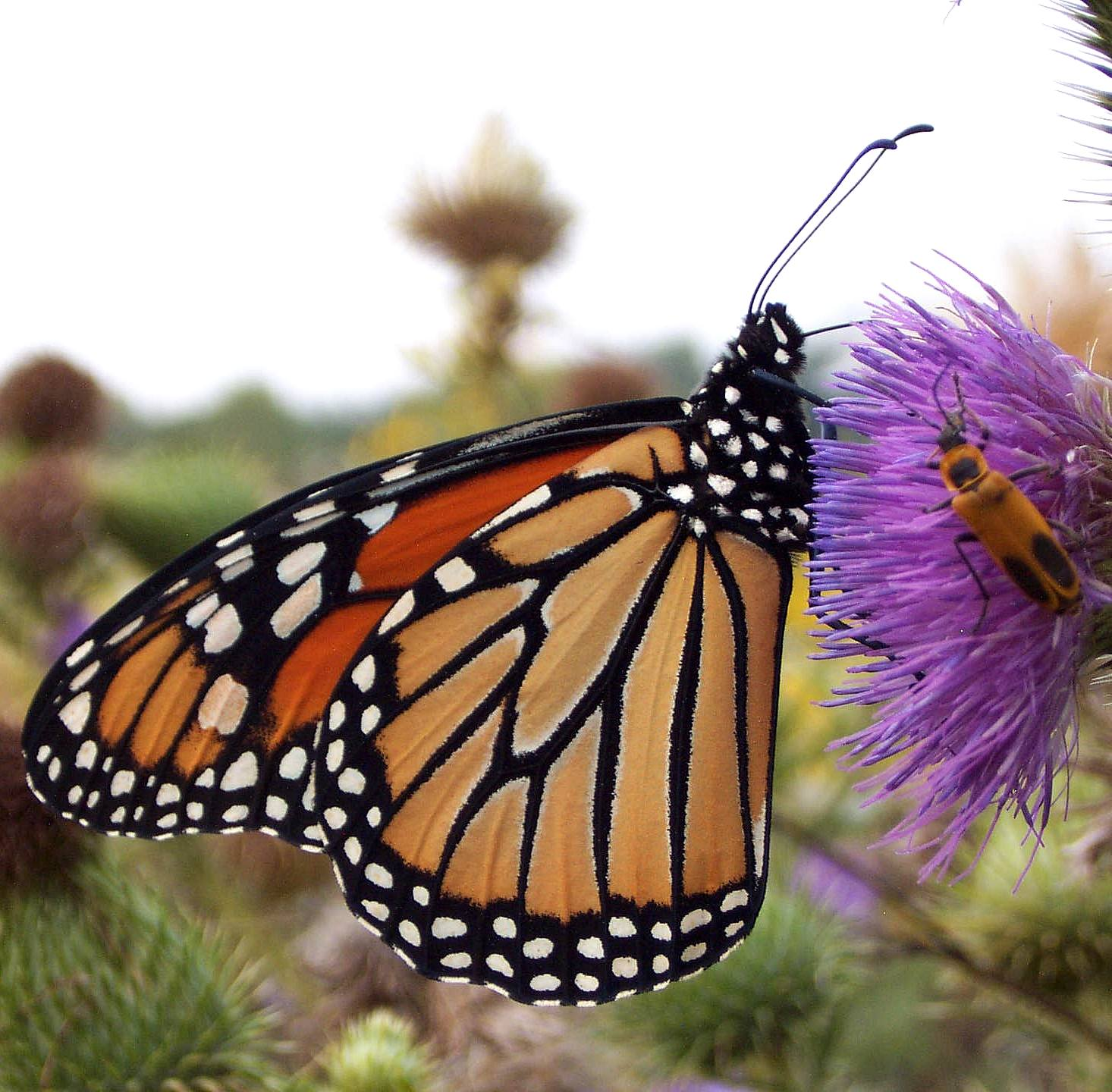
A Monarch Butterfly at the Morton Arboretum

A time-lapse of a bike ride on the west side

The Morton Arboretum was established on December 14, 1922, by Joy Morton, founder of the Morton Salt Company. Morton's father, Julius Sterling Morton, had founded Arbor Day. Morton's daughter, Jean Cudahy (Morton) took her father's seat on the board of trustees after he died in 1934. The arboretum's first superintendent was Clarence E. Godshalk. Joy Morton's Thornhill estate, established in 1910 on 175 acres, formed the core of the arboretum's original area. In 1940, Mrs. Cudahy hired May Theilgaard Watts as a teacher in the new educational program, and she developed an extensive nature and art education program. The Morton family requested an educational center be constructed on the site of their home. Most of the house was razed in the early 1940s following the death of Joy's wife Margaret. Only the Founder's Room, Joy Morton's former library, remains as part of the Thornhill Education Center.

The Schulenberg Prairie restoration project began in 1962. Clarence Godshalk developed plans to create a buffer on the western border of the arboretum. He called it "a native planting" and planned for it to be on farmland acquired by the arboretum in the late 1950s. He wanted to turn old farmland back into a prairie with seeds collected from prairies nearby. He asked Ray Schulenberg to take this on. Schulenberg developed restoration goals and began replicating composition, structure, and local gene pools of plants in local prairies. He studied all of this with Floyd Swink, the arboretum's taxonomist at the time, Robert Betz, a biologist, and David Kropp, a landscape architect.

=== Morton family trustees ===
The first chairman of the board of trustees for The Morton Arboretum was Joy Morton. Following his death in 1934, his daughter, Jean M. Cudahy (Morton), became chairman of the board. Jean died in 1953 and her brother, Sterling, became chairman. When Sterling died in 1961, his daughter Suzette Morton Davidson became chairman of the board. in 1977, Davidson, the last Morton family board member, retired and was replaced by the first person outside of the Morton family to be chairman of the board, Charles C. Hafner III.

=== Administration ===
The Morton Arboretum is a nonprofit governed by a volunteer board of trustees. It has had four executive leaders in its history. Clarence Godshalk (1939-1966); Marion Trufant Hall, Ph.D. (1966-1990); Gerard T. Donnelly, Ph.D. (1990-2022); and Jill Koski, who became president and CEO in 2022.

== Center for Tree Science ==
In the arboretum's Center for Tree Science, more than 30 scientists conduct research focusing on urban trees and forests, ecosystem restoration and management, and tree biodiversity and conservation science.

== Global Tree Conservation Program ==
The arboretum's Global Tree Conservation Program works to conserve rare and threatened tree species through research, conservation and collaboration. There is a special focus on oaks (Quercus); the Global Conservation Consortium for Oak, a partnership with Botanic Gardens Conservation International, is based at The Morton Arboretum. As of 2026, tree conservation work was underway in Mesoamerica, including Mexico and Costa Rica, and in Asia, including Vietnam and Laos. The program also manages the International Union for the Conservation of Nature (IUCN) Center for Species Survival: Trees.

== Chicago Region Trees Initiative ==
The arboretum's urban forestry outreach program was founded in 2014 after the first Chicago Region Tree Census revealed gaps and threats to the region's trees. The Chicago Region Trees initiative has partners with public agencies, civic groups, and other organizations to provide training, plant trees, encourage collaboration, and offer resources such as suggested language for tree protection laws. It also supports research about the region's tree canopy and provides data to help guide and focus investment in trees.

== Plant Clinic ==
The Morton Arboretum's Plant Clinic provides free advice and answers questions from the public about trees and plants. In 2024 it answered more than 15,000 queries from around the world. The arboretum also provides extensive plant information on its website, including a weekly Plant Health Care Report during the growing season.

== Sterling Morton Library ==
Designed by noted Chicago architect Harry Weese, the Sterling Morton Library was constructed in 1963 and named after Sterling Morton, son of founder Joy Morton and a former board chairman. It holds more than 30,000 books and magazines, as well as tens of thousands of non-book items including prints, original art, letters, photographs, landscape plans and drawings. The collections focus on plant sciences, especially on trees and shrubs; gardening and landscape design; ecology, with a special interest in Midwestern prairie, savanna, woodland, and wetland ecosystems; natural history; and botanical art. Its catalog is online.

The library's Suzette Morton Davidson Special Collections includes books, artwork, historic nursery catalogs, landscape drawings, photographs, letters, maps and institutional documents. It also includes documents of May Theilgaard Watts, Jens Jensen, Marshall Johnson, O.C. Simonds and Donald Culross Peattie.

The Sterling Morton Library is a member of the Council on Botanical and Horticultural Libraries.

== Visitor Center ==
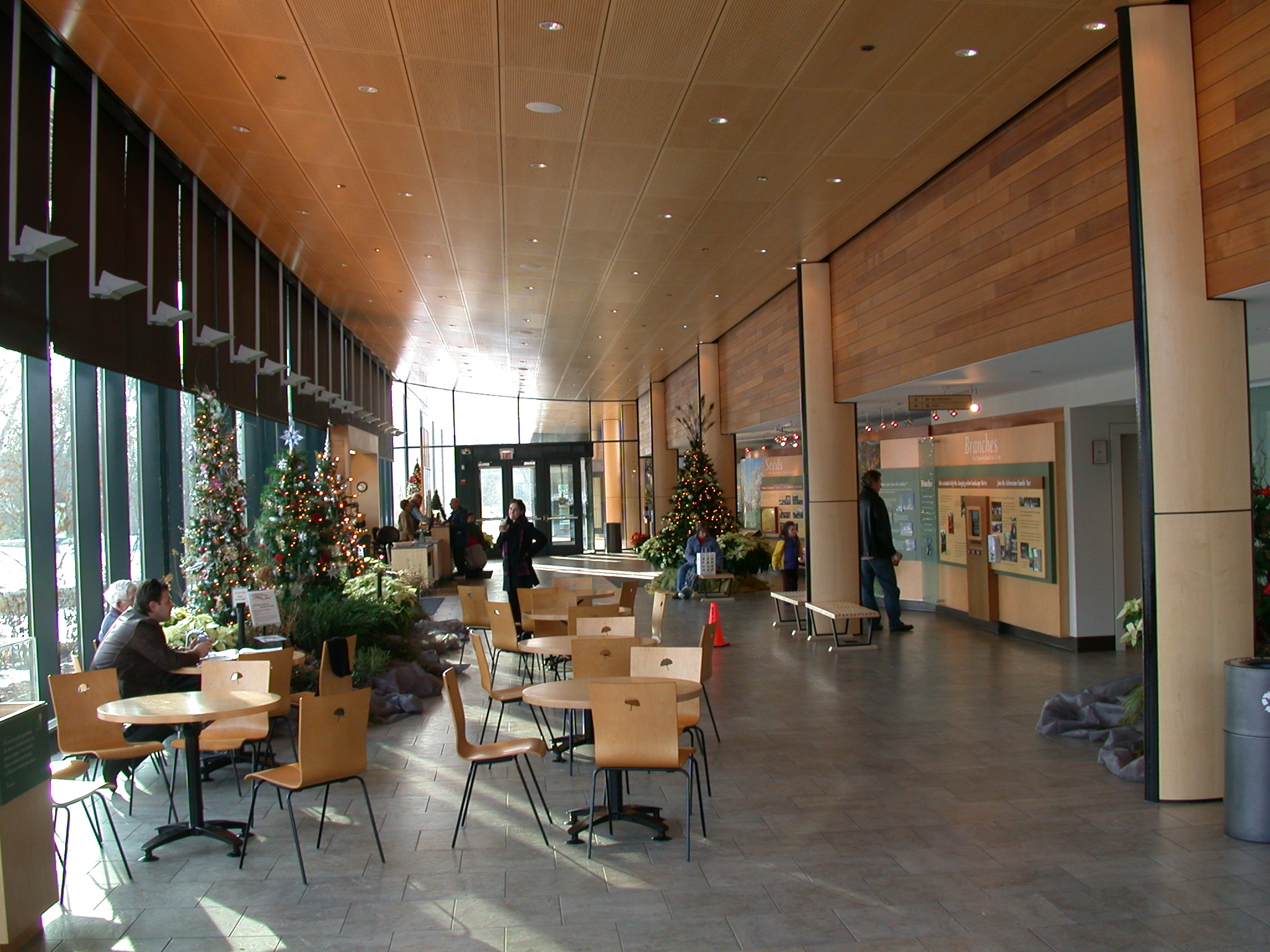
Visitor Center

The 36,000 sq ft (3,300 m^{2}) Visitor Center was built in 2004 and designed by David Woodhouse Architects. The building includes wood representing the Arboretum's collections and incorporates sustainable features such as permeable pavers in the parking lots and local fieldstone salvaged from a predecessor building.

== Illumination ==
Since 2013, an annual Illumination tree lights event has been conducted at the arboretum from the end of November until early January. The illumination section is along a mile-stretch of curved, paved pathway.

== See also ==
- Chicago Botanic Garden
- List of botanical gardens in the United States
- List of Museums and Cultural Institutions in Chicago
- North American Plant Collections Consortium
