= Ulmus × hollandica 'Pioneer' =

Elm cultivar

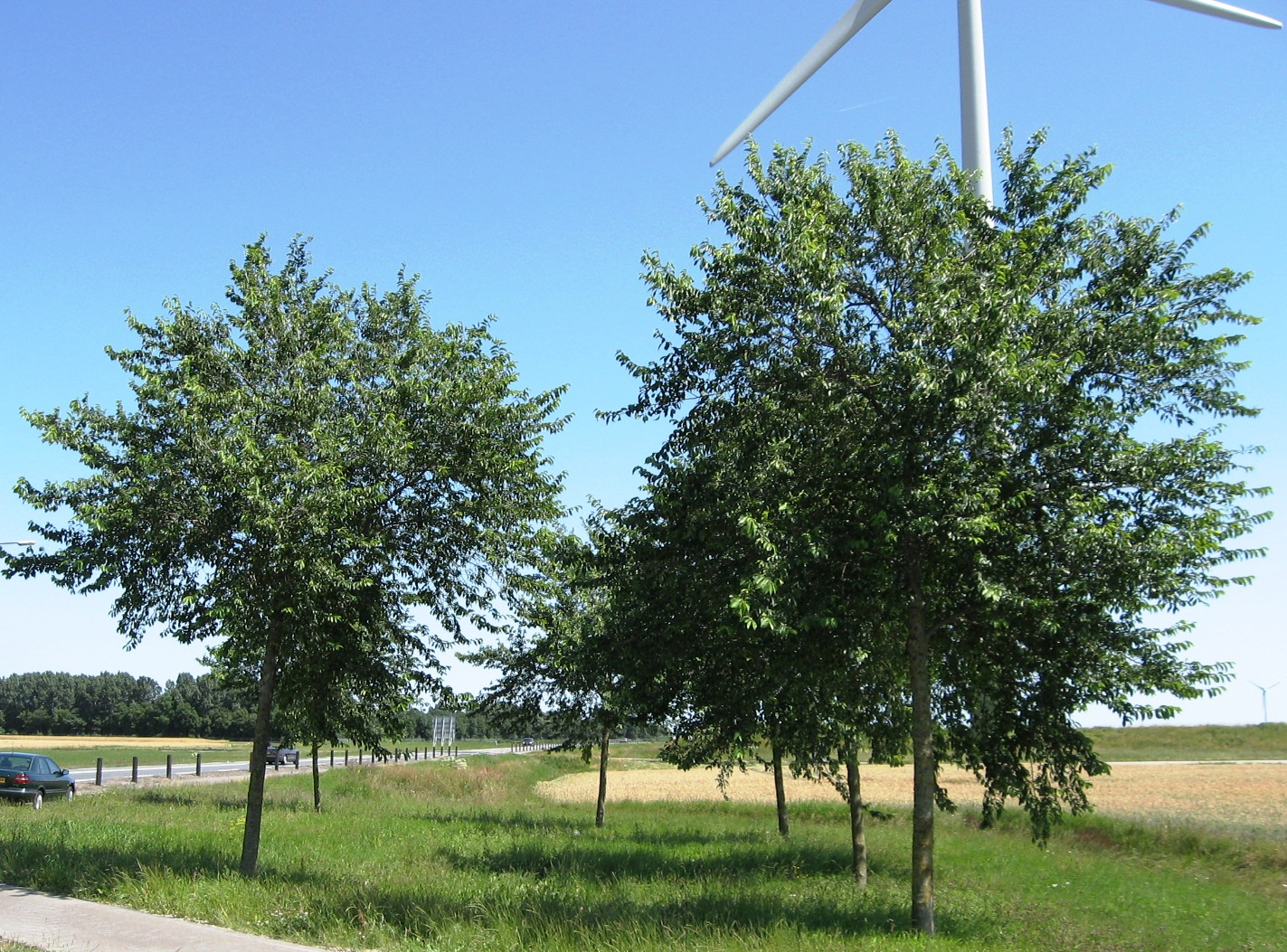
- 'Pioneer', Netherlands
- Hybrid parentage: U. glabra × U. minor
- Cultivar: 'Pioneer'
- Origin: US

The hybrid elm cultivar Ulmus × hollandica 'Pioneer' is an American clone arising from the crossing of two European species, Wych Elm U. glabra (female parent) and Field Elm U. minor. Raised by the USDA station at Delaware, Ohio, in 1971, 'Pioneer' was released to commerce in 1983.

Dutch dendrologist Martin Tijdgat, noting that the "branch fragility" of the cultivar could indicate the influence of Ulmus pumila, and that the leaf recalled 'Hoersholmiensis', 'conjectured that 'Pioneer' might not be a straight cultivar of Ulmus × hollandica, but a complex hybrid with Heybroek's clone '215' ('Commelin' × (U. pumila 'Pinnato-ramosa' × U. minor 'Hoersholmiensis')), used in the breeding of 'Homestead', in its parentage.

== Description ==
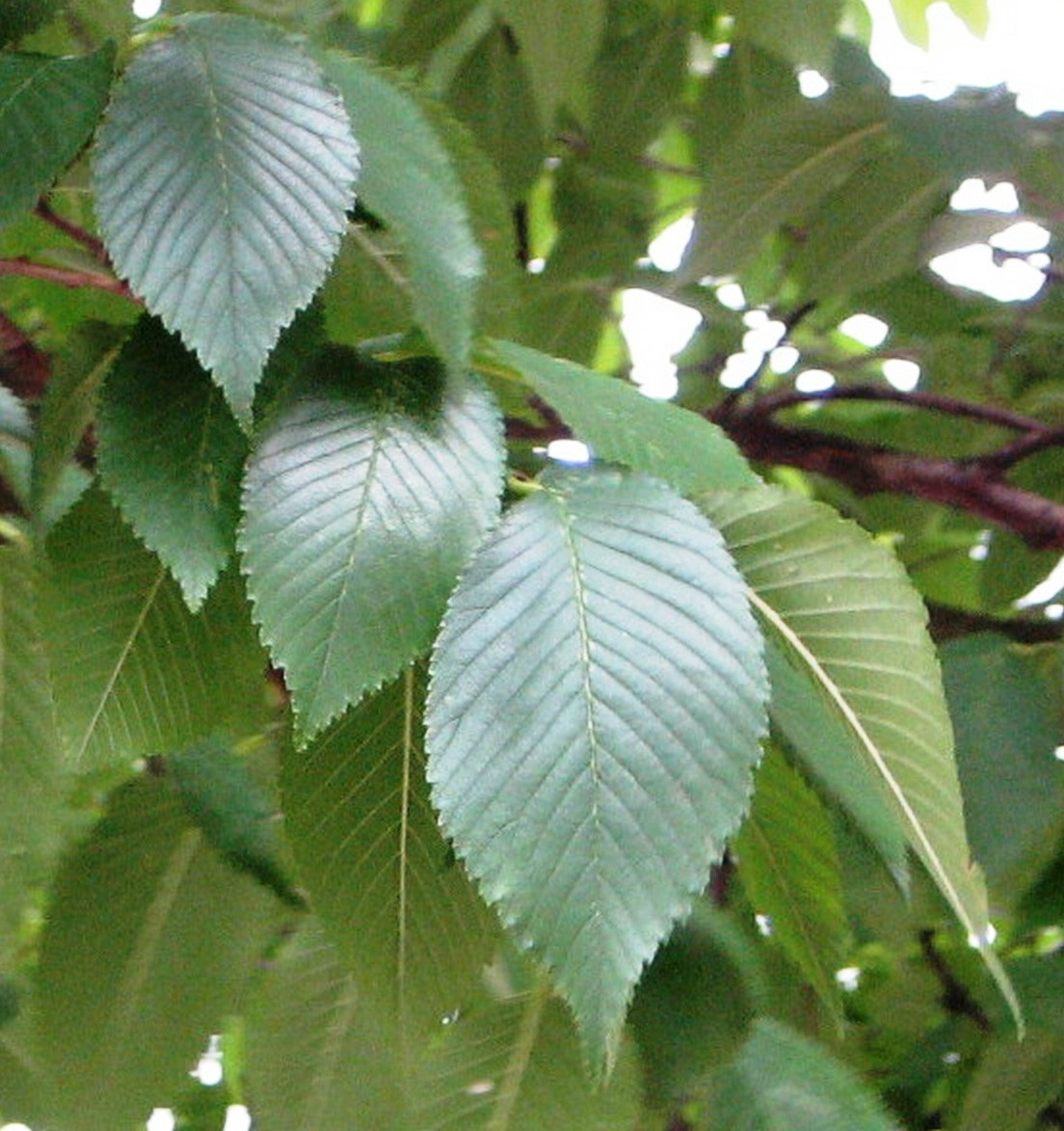
'Pioneer' leaves

'Pioneer' is a fast-growing tree distinguished by a dense, globular crown, which as it matures becomes more broad than tall, like its U. glabra parent, and casting a heavy shade. The leaves are deep green, and similar in shape to the Wych Elm, colouring yellow and red in the fall. The perfect, apetalous wind-pollinated flowers appear in early March.

== Pests and diseases ==
The tree's resistance to Dutch elm disease, rated 4 out of 5, is somewhat less than more recent American hybrids, and for this reason the tree was omitted from the elm trials in eastern Arizona conducted by the Northern Arizona University. 'Pioneer' is also severely damaged by the elm leaf beetle Xanthogaleruca luteola, sustaining more foliar damage (50%) than any other cultivar in an assessment conducted as part of the National Elm Trial at U C Davis, and Japanese beetle. Tolerance of elm yellows in the United States was also found to be poor.

The tree's foliage was adjudged "resistant" to black spot by the Plant Diagnostic Clinic of the University of Missouri .

== Cultivation ==
Considered "quite hardy in Saint Paul", and "definitely a good selection for the Twin Cities (St. Paul and Minnesota) urban forest" although very different in appearance to the American elm. 'Pioneer' has had a very limited introduction to Europe, featuring in street tree trials in several Dutch cities in the late 1990s. The tree has reputedly been planted in Preston Park, Brighton, and along Tisbury Road, Hove, but does not feature in the NCCPG National Elm Collection held there.

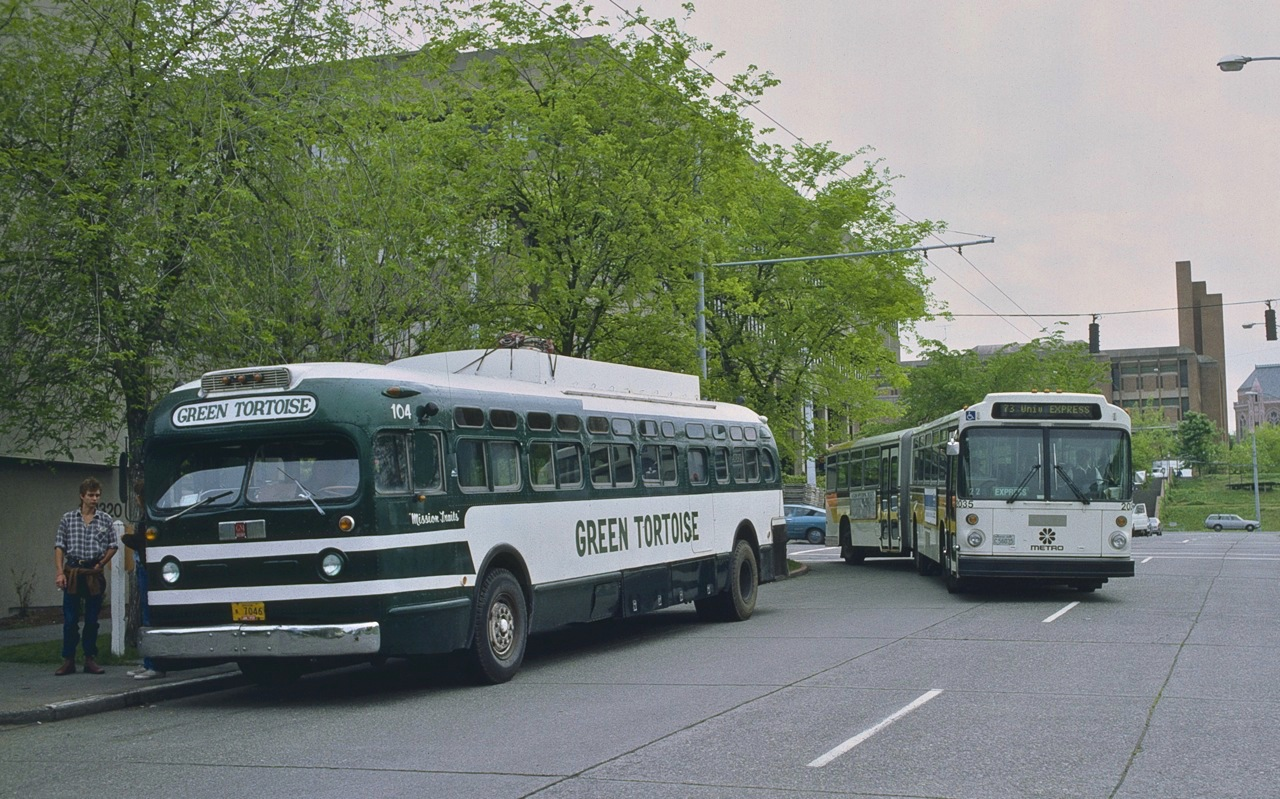
Four 'Pioneer' south of Schmitz Hall, Campus Parkway, Seattle (1984)

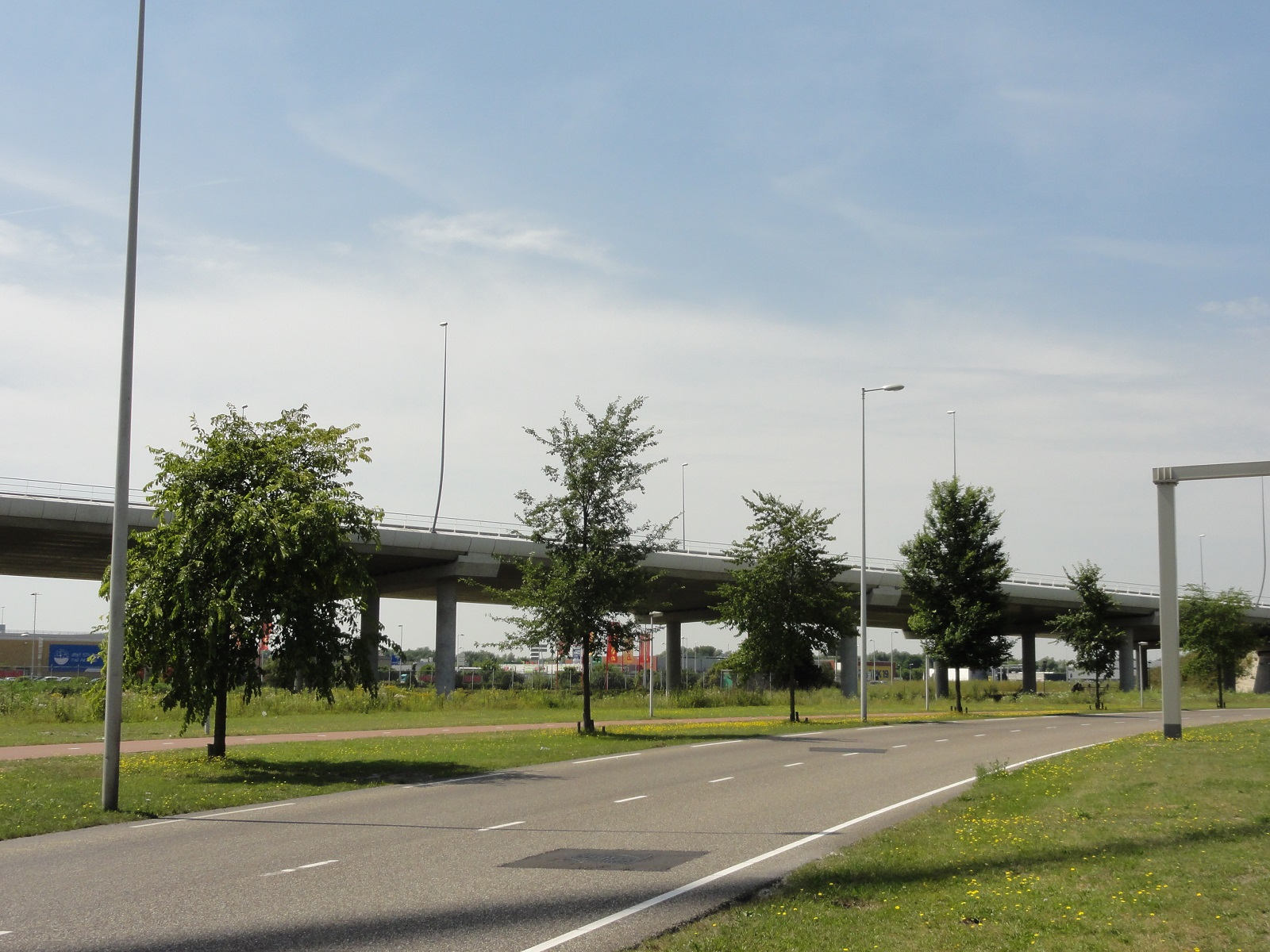
Elm cultivars, Netherlands; 'Pioneer' 3rd from left (2014)

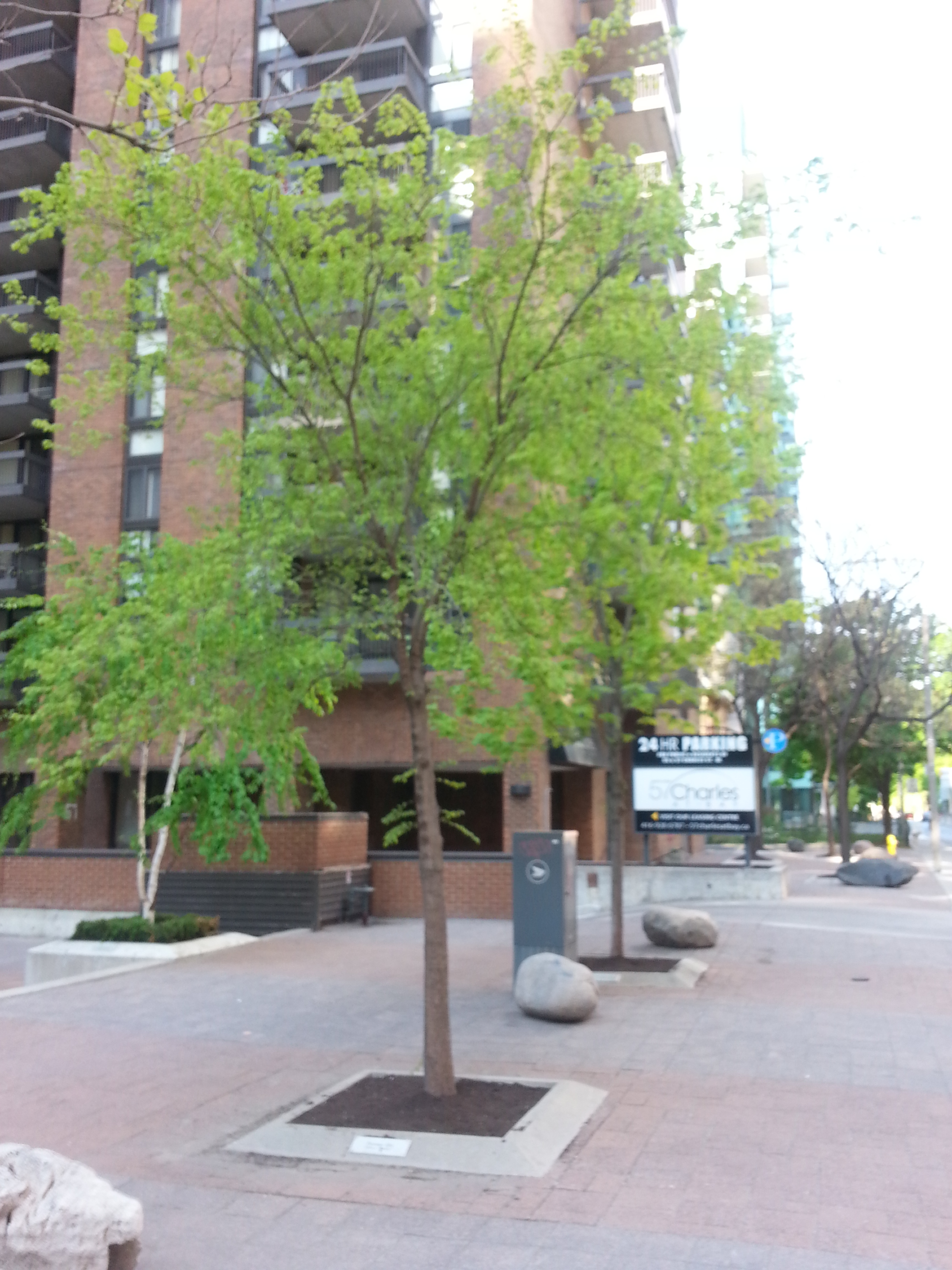
'Pioneer' in Toronto (May 2016)

== Accessions ==
=== North America ===
- Bartlett Tree Experts, US. Acc. nos. 85–0195, 85–0199
- Denver Botanic Gardens, US. No acc. details.
- Dawes Arboretum, Newark, Ohio, US. 1 tree (2022), accession no. D1986-0021.001
- Dominion Arboretum, Ottawa, Canada. No acc. details.
- Holden Arboretum, US. Acc. no. 90–58
- New York Botanical Garden, US. Acc. no. 955/97
- Smith College, US. Acc. no. 5603.
- University of Idaho Arboretum, US. One tree. Acc. no. 1990013
- U S National Arboretum , Washington, D.C., US. Acc. no. 76233.

=== Europe ===
- Grange Farm Arboretum, Sutton St. James, Spalding, Lincolnshire, UK. Acc. No. 544

== Nurseries ==
=== North America ===
- Bailey Nurseries , St. Paul, Minnesota, US.
- ForestFarm , Williams, Oregon, US.
- J. Frank Schmidt & Son Co., Boring, Oregon, US.
- Johnson's Nursery , Menomonee Falls, Wisconsin, US.
- Pea Ridge Forest , Hermann, Missouri, US.
- Sun Valley Garden Centre, Eden Prairie, Minnesota, US.

=== Europe ===
- Batouwe Boomkwekerij B.V., , Dodewaard, Netherlands.
- Noordplant , Glimmen, Netherlands.
- Van Den Berk (UK) Ltd., , London, UK
- Westerveld Boomkwekerij B.V., Opheusden, Netherlands.
