= Ulmus minor 'Hoersholmiensis' =

Elm cultivar

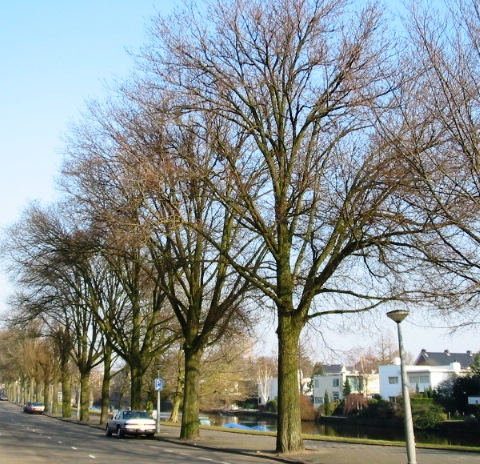
- 'Hoersholmiensis', Amsterdam.
- Species: Ulmus minor
- Cultivar: 'Hoersholmiensis'
- Origin: Hørsholm, Denmark

The Field Elm cultivar Ulmus minor 'Hoersholmiensis', Hoersholm elm, originated from seed sown at the Hørsholm Planteskole, Denmark, c. 1885, where it was propagated by the nursery proprietor Lars Nielsen. The Späth nursery of Berlin, however, which marketed 'Hoersholmiensis' in the interwar period, considered it a hybrid rather than a form of field elm, a view shared by Christine Buisman, who in 1931 labelled a herbarium specimen from a Späth-sourced tree in The Hague as a form of Ulmus × hollandica.

== Description ==
Upright-columnar in habit and rapid in growth when young, the tree becomes more globose with age. The leaves, 8 – 14 cm long by 3 – 5 cm wide, are lanceolate or narrowly obovate, acuminate at the tip and with a cuneate base, light green in colour, turning a deep yellow (sometimes following a brief orange-red) in autumn. The samara is heart-shaped, with marginal seed by a markedly open notch.

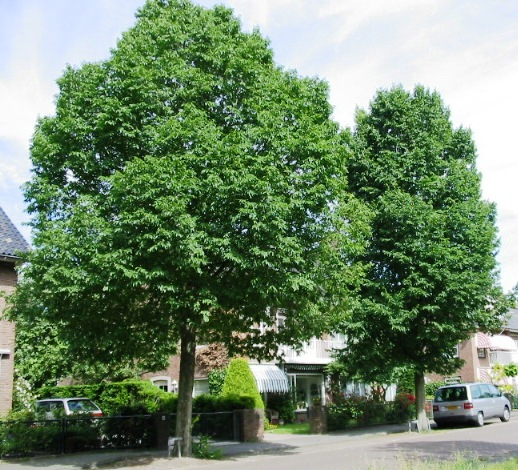
Mature trees, Spelderslaan, Wassenaar, The Netherlands

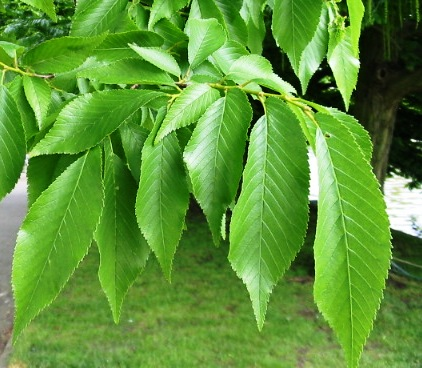
'Hoersholmiensis' foliage

== Pests and diseases ==
'Hoersholmiensis' is susceptible to Dutch elm disease and Coral-spot Fungus Nectria cinnabarina.

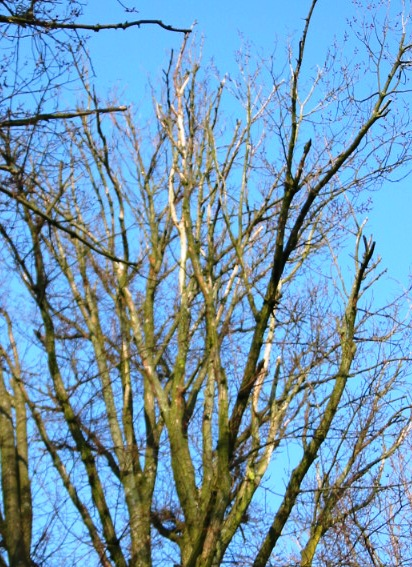
Damage caused by Nectria cinnabarina

== Cultivation ==
Originally selected for its tidy shape, long elegant leaves and fine autumn colour, the tree remains in cultivation in Denmark, Sweden, Finland, and the Netherlands. In Denmark it is usually propagated by base-grafting on wych elm; here the oldest known plantation was 65 trees on the Tuborgvej, Copenhagen, planted in 1906. The Späth nursery of Berlin distributed 'Hoersholmiensis' from the late 1920s. In the Netherlands it was planted notably along the Westlandsgracht in Amsterdam where it still survives, although upper branches are often killed by Coral-spot Fungus. It was also present in The Hague and Utrecht in the 1930s. Heybroek, having observed in 1957 its wind-resistance in Schleswig-Holstein, included Hoersholm elm in his breeding programme (see 'Hybrid cultivars' below). Fontaine confirmed it a useful wind-break tree. The tree was briefly propagated and marketed in the UK by the Hillier & Sons nursery, Winchester, Hampshire, from 1974 to 1977, during which time 187 were sold. 'Hoersholmiensis' is not known to have been introduced to Australia or New Zealand.

== Notable trees ==
Fine unpruned specimens stand in Stockholm, in Raoul Wallenberg square and the Karlaplan.

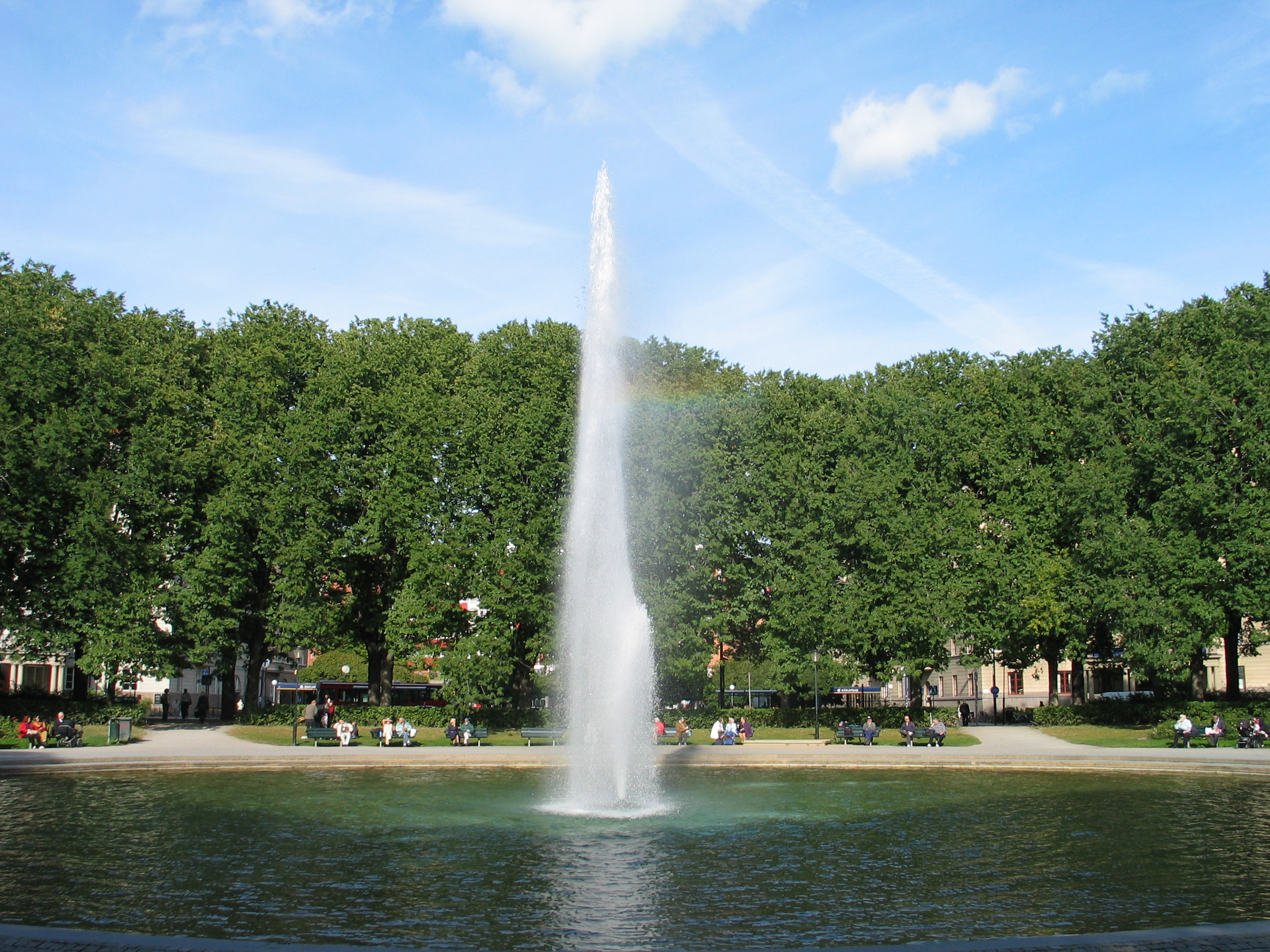
'Hoersholmiensis' in the Karlaplan, Stockholm (2005)

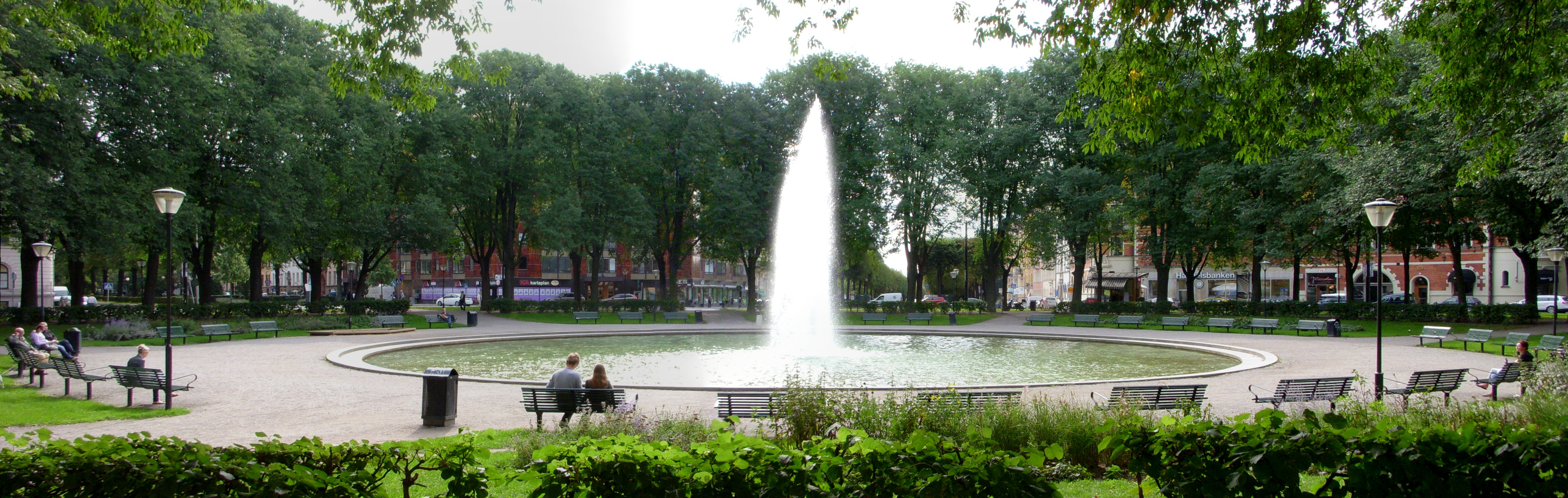
Same (2011)

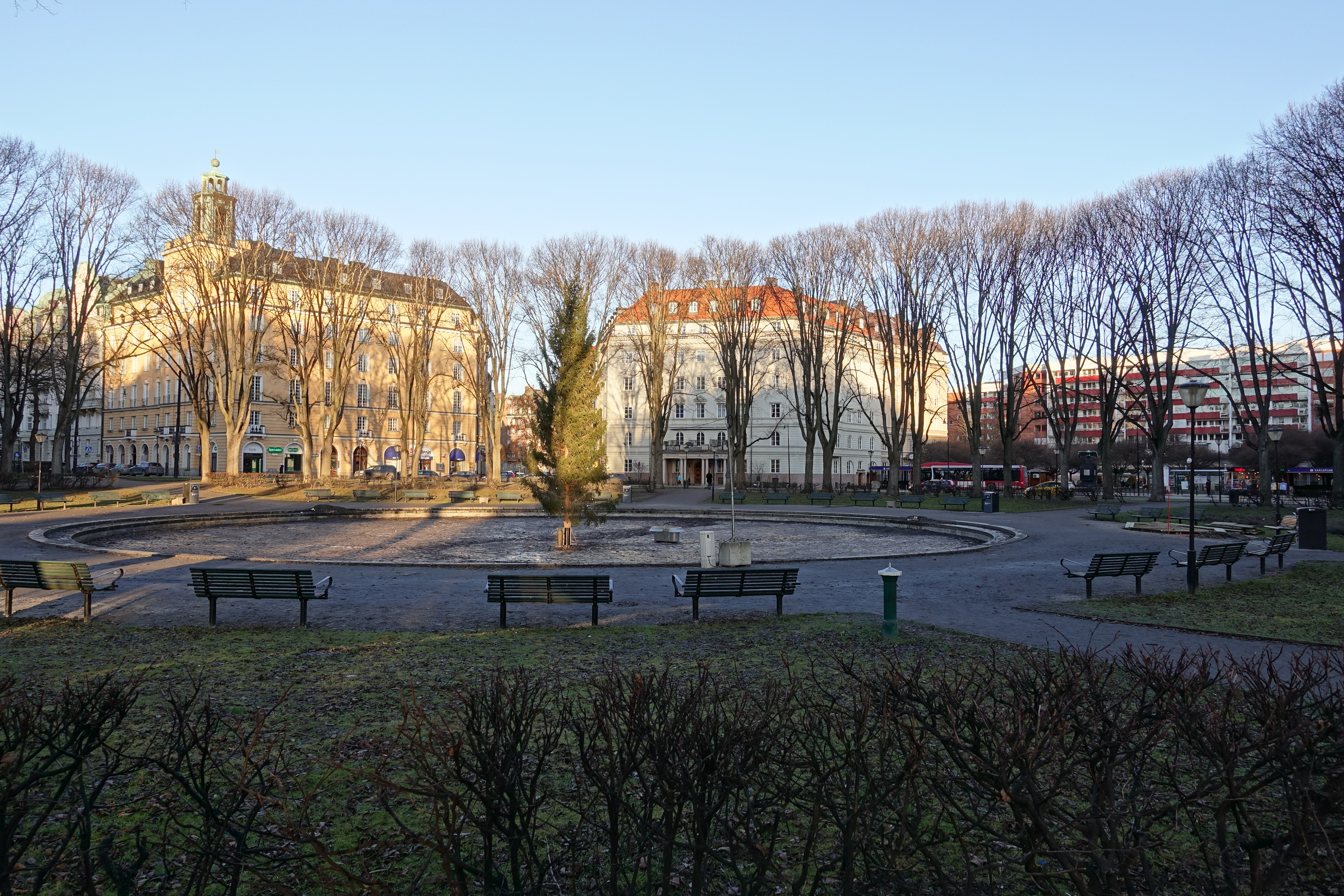
Same (2016)

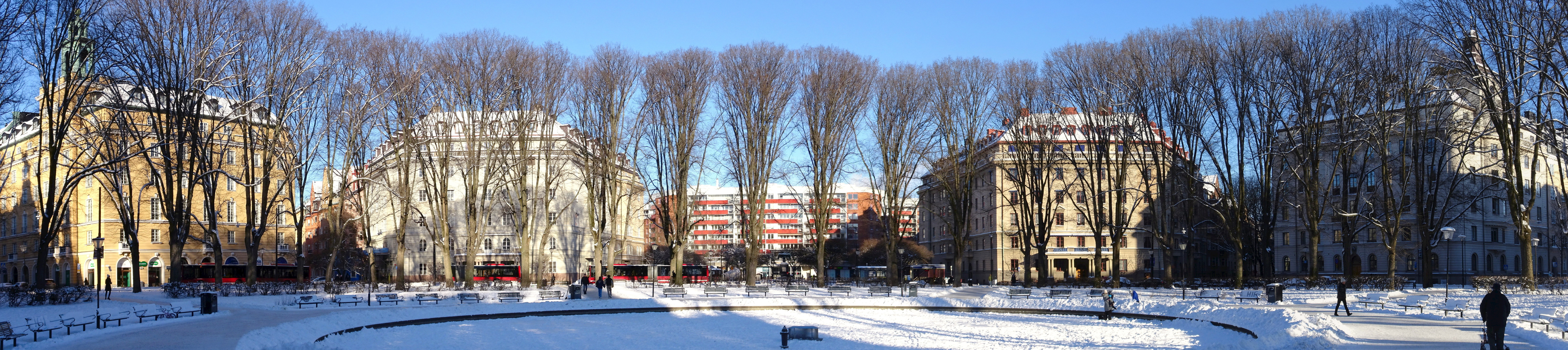
Same (2021)

Six 'Hoersholm', grafted on wych stock and planted in 1932, grow on the edge of Kurjenkaivonkenttä square, Turku, Finland, the largest 16 m tall with bole girth of 232 cm (2020). The Finnish champion, felled in 2020, also grew there, with a circumference of 240 cm at breast height (1991). The only known UK specimens (2025) are a large old dome-shaped tree by Birmingham New Road, on the edge of Silver Jubilee Park, Coseley, perhaps supplied by nearby Handsworth Nurseries, and a younger one overlooking Allenvale Cemetery, Aberdeen, the sole survivor of a stand of six.

== Putative specimen ==
An old elm (bole girth 4.2 m) with 'Hoersholm'-like leaves, at the Armagh St Bridge entrance to Hagley Park, Christchurch, appears on the New Zealand Tree Register as a conjectured specimen.

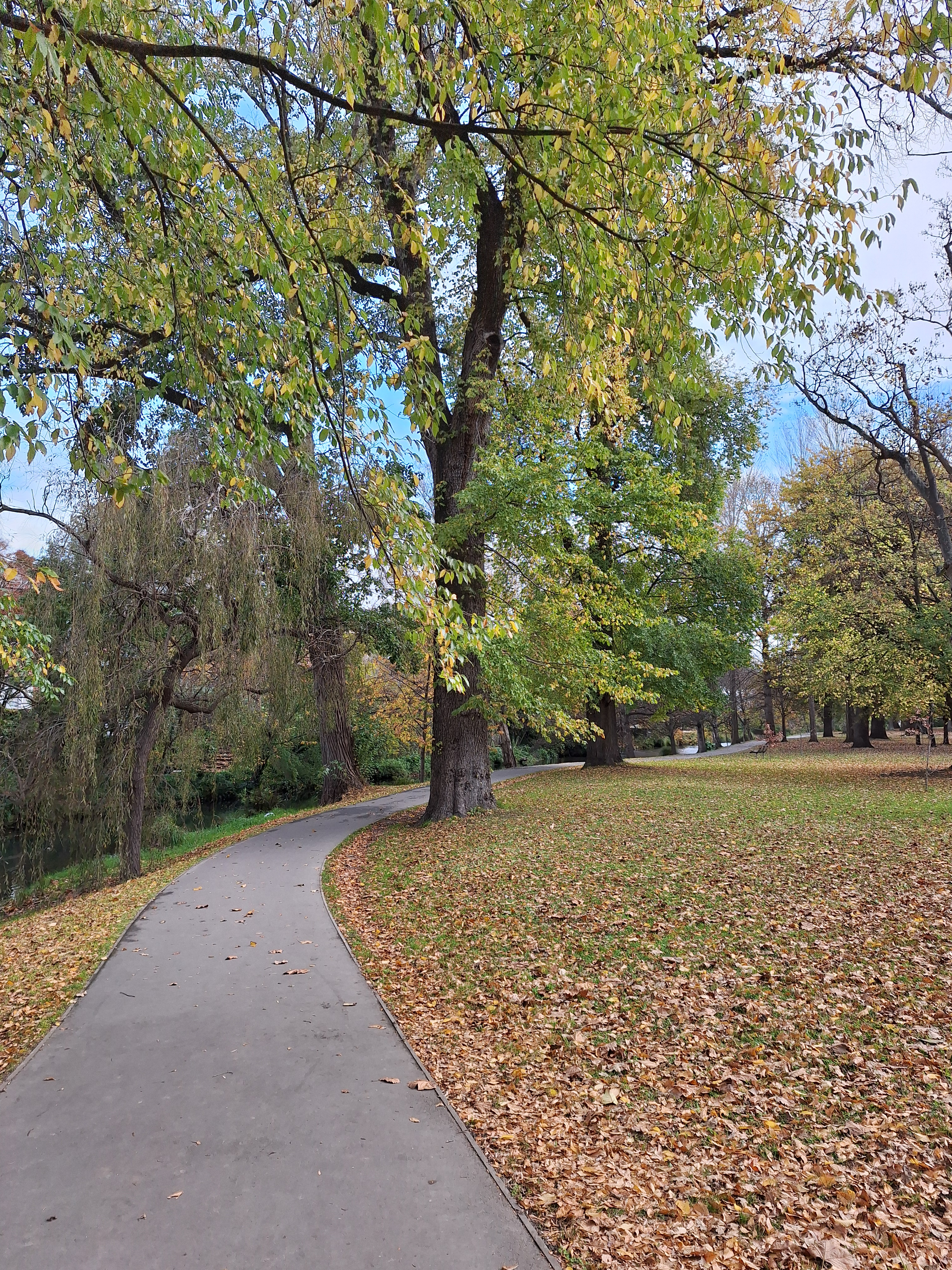
Narrow leaves of putative 'Hoersholm' (bole out of sight), Armagh St Bridge, Christchurch (2025)

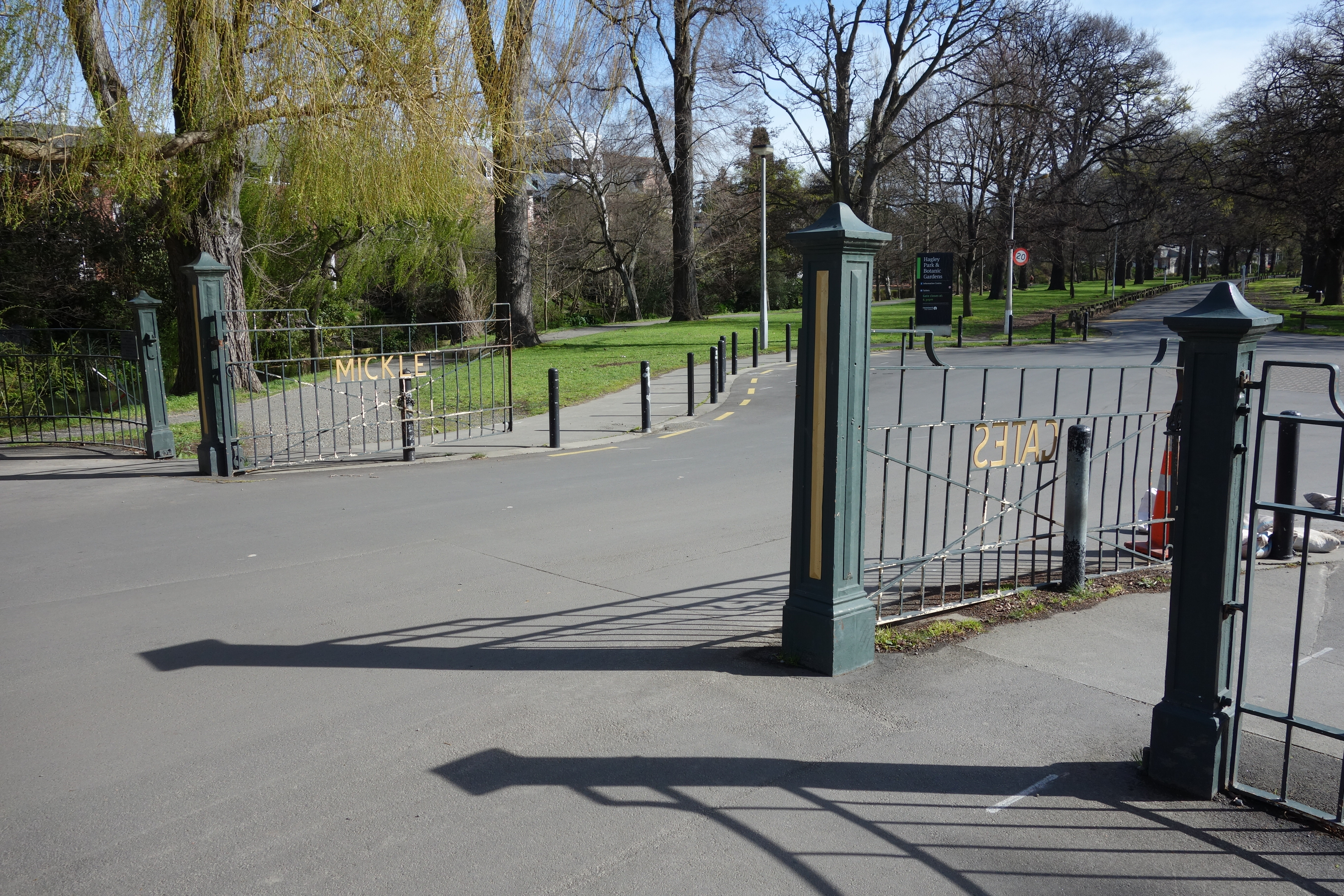
Elms at Armagh St Bridge, Christchurch, with putative 'Hoersholm' on left (2013)

== Cultivar ==
'Holmstruph', a seedling from a batch of 'Hoersholmiensis', was selected at Asger M. Jensen's nursery in Holmstrup, Denmark, circa 1930, and propagated and marketed into the 1950s. No specimens are known to survive.

== Hybrid cultivars ==
The tree was hybridized with 'Commelin' and U. pumila as part of the Dutch elm breeding programme at the De Dorschkamp Institute, Wageningen. Seeds arising from the crossing were donated by Hans Heybroek to the University of Wisconsin-Madison programme in 1960. The clone 'Regal' was a frost-hardy selection from the resultant seedlings, whilst the later 1984 USDA release 'Homestead' arose from the crossing of another with U. pumila.

== Synonymy ==
- Ulmus carpinifolia 'Hoersholm': Krüssmann, Handbuch der Laubgehölze 2: 534, 1962
- Ulmus carpinifolia 'Hoersholmensis': Mededeeling, Comite inzake Bestudeering en Bestrijding van de Iepenziekte, 13: 10, 1933
- Ulmus carpinifolia 'Hoersholmii': Plant Buyer's Guide, ed. 6, 285, 1958
- Ulmus carpinifolia var. horsholmii: Melville, Journal of the Linnean Society of London, Botany, 53: 88, 90. 1946

== Accessions ==
=== Europe ===
- Grange Farm Arboretum, Sutton St James, Spalding, Lincolnshire, UK. Acc. no. 1078.

== Nurseries ==
=== Europe ===
- Centrum voor Botanische Verrijking vzw, Kampenhout, Belgium, (as Ulmus minor 'Hoersholm').
- Noordplant , Glimmen, The Netherlands
- De Reebock , Zwalm, Belgium
