= Ulmus minor 'Holmstruph' =

Elm cultivar

- Species: Ulmus minor
- Cultivar: 'Holmstruph'
- Origin: Holmstrup, Denmark

The Field Elm cultivar Ulmus minor 'Holmstruph' was selected from seedlings of 'Hoersholmiensis' at Asger M. Jensen's nursery, Holmstrup, Denmark, and featured in the Plant Buyer's Guide ed. 6. 286 1958. Green (1964) confirmed the field elm identification.

== Description ==
The tree was chosen on account of its strong, quick-growing upright stem and branches bearing small leaves, making it suitable for street planting.

== Cultivation ==
No specimens are known to survive. In 2025 Brighton and Hove City Council listed one of the old fastigiate elms in Surrenden Road, Brighton, by this name, without provenance information, though 'Holmstruph' is not known to have been introduced to the UK and though no herbarium specimens are known.

== Synonymy ==
- Ulmus campestris Holmstrupii
