= Kortenhoef =

- Village
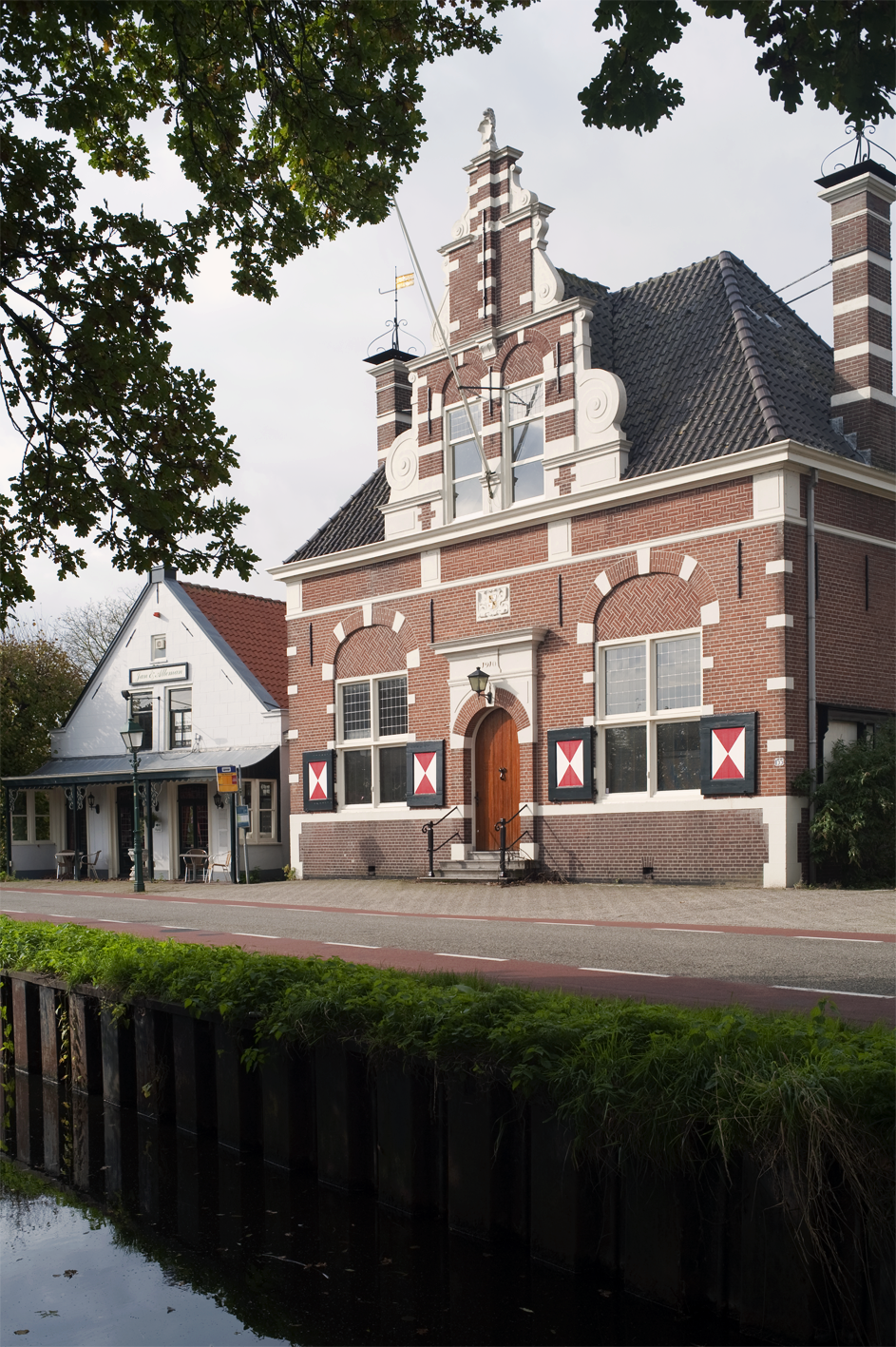
- Rijksmonument, former Kortenhoef Town Hall

- Coat of arms

- Location in the Netherlands Location in the province of North Holland in the Netherlands
- Coordinates: 52°14′23″N 5°6′53″E
- Country: Netherlands
- Province: North Holland
- Municipality: Wijdemeren

Area
  - Total: 14.81 km^{2} (5.72 sq mi)
- Elevation: 0.2 m (0.66 ft)

Population (2021)
  - Total: 6,710
  - Density: 453/km^{2} (1,170/sq mi)
- Time zone: UTC+1 (CET)
  - Summer (DST): UTC+2 (CEST)
- Postal code: 1241
- Dialing code: 035

Kortenhoef (Dutch pronunciation: [ˈkɔrtə(n)ɦuf] or [kɔrtə(n)ˈɦuf]) is a village in North Holland, Netherlands with a population of about 6,780. It is an important part of the municipality of Wijdemeren, and lies about 5 km northwest of Hilversum. Kortenhoef was a separate municipality until 1966, when it was merged with 's-Graveland retaining the latter name; it merged with Loosdrecht and Nederhorst den Berg to form the new municipality of Wijdemeren in 2002.

The village was first mentioned in 1235 as Curtenhoven, and means "short piece of land". It refers to the narrow plots of the peat excavation area. Kortenhoef developed in the 12th century as a linear settlement.

The Dutch Reformed church is a single aisled church with needle spire. The tower and choir were built during the second half of the 14th century. The former town hall was built in Renaissance Revival style in 1910. It was extended in 1930.

Kortenhoef was home to 534 people in 1840. Around 1900, it became a painter's village due to the landscape surrounding the village.

== Gallery ==
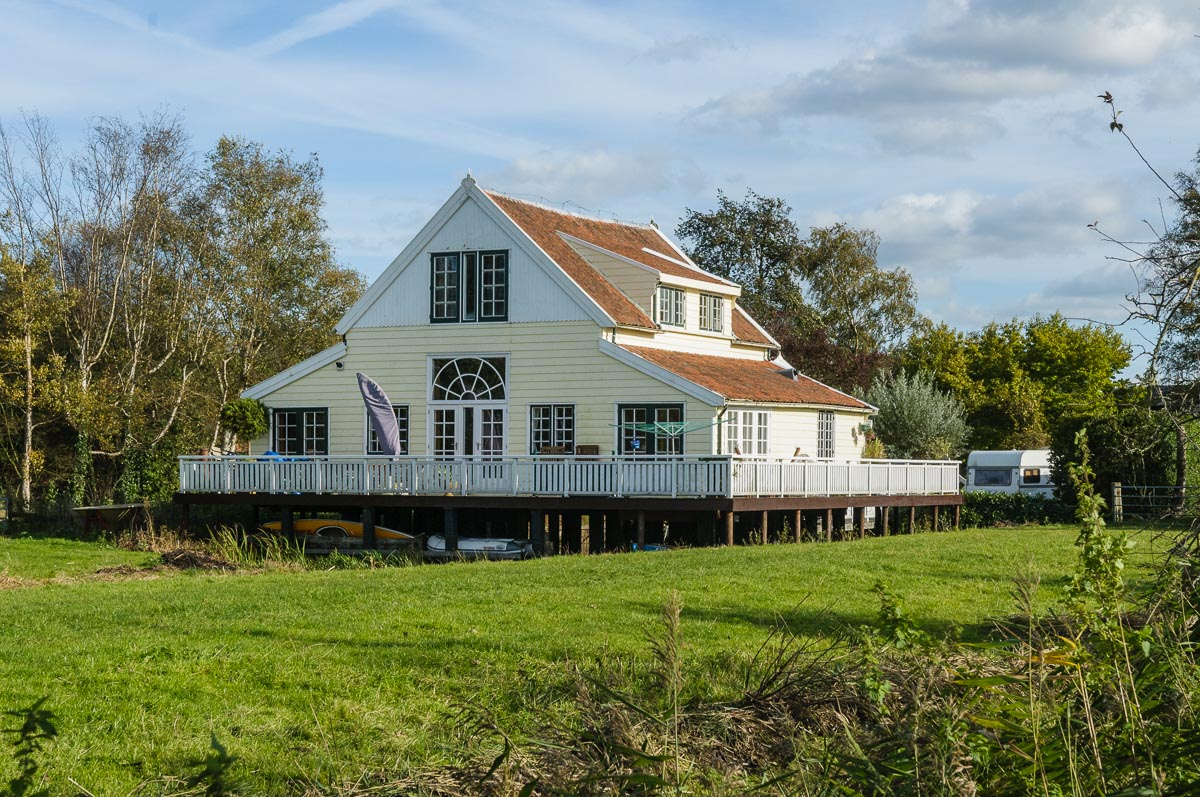
De Karekiet

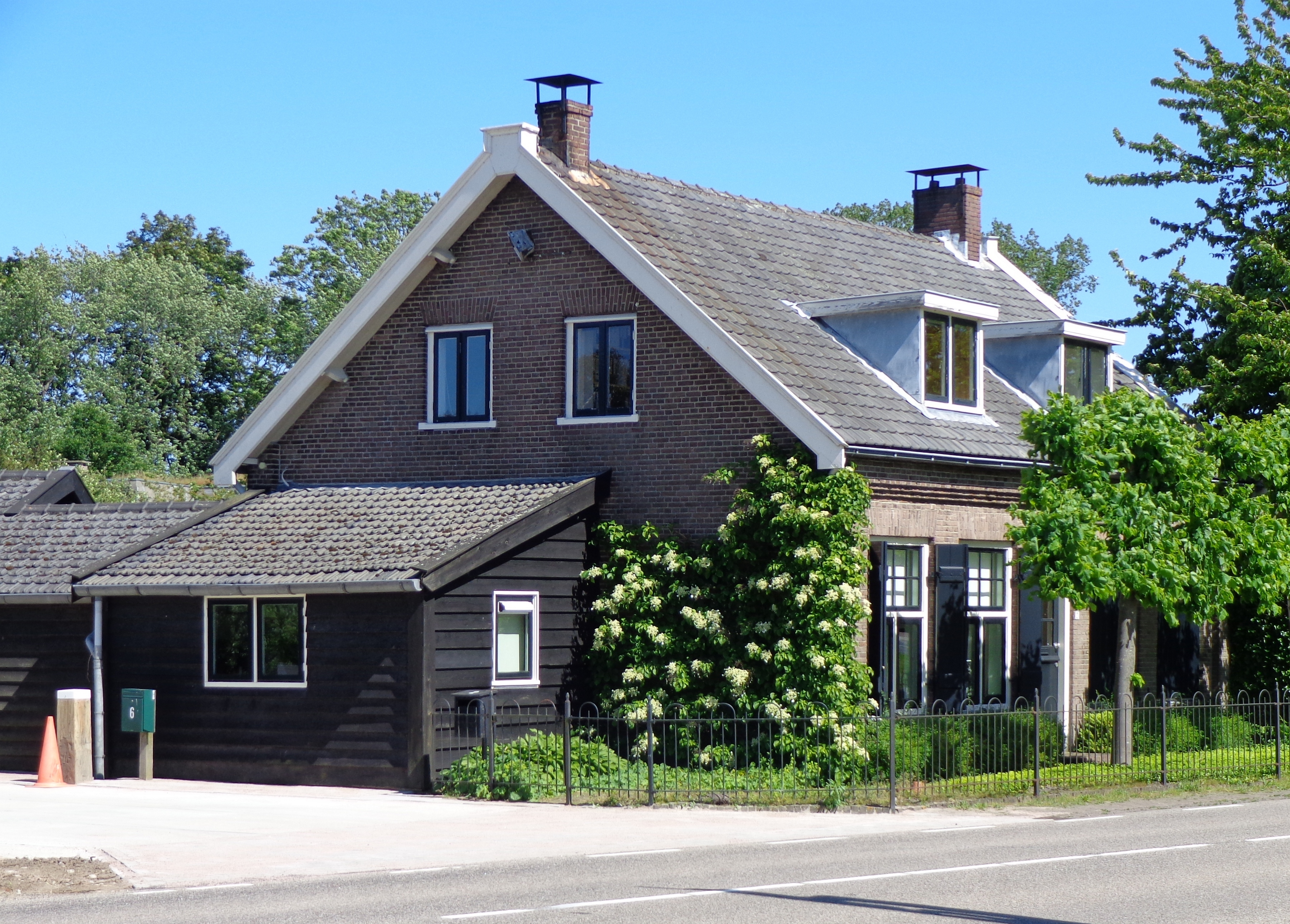
Fortwachterswoning

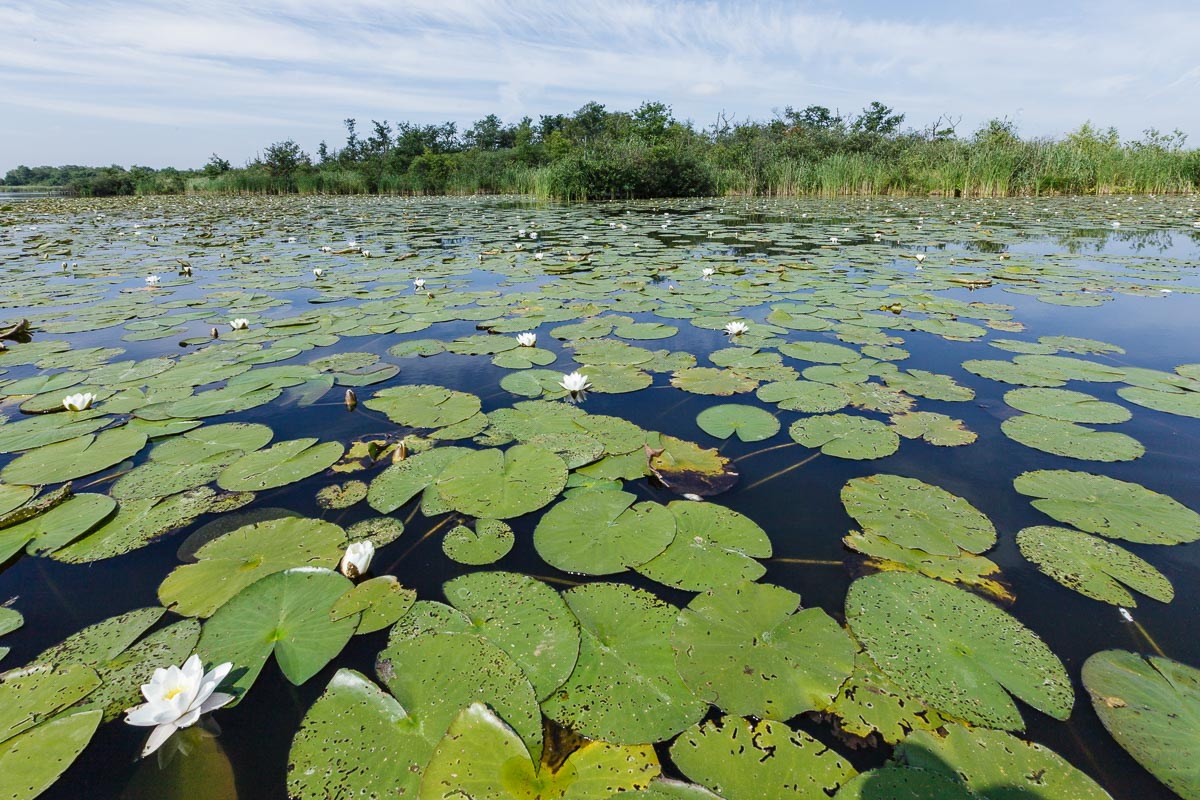
Kortenhoefse Plassen

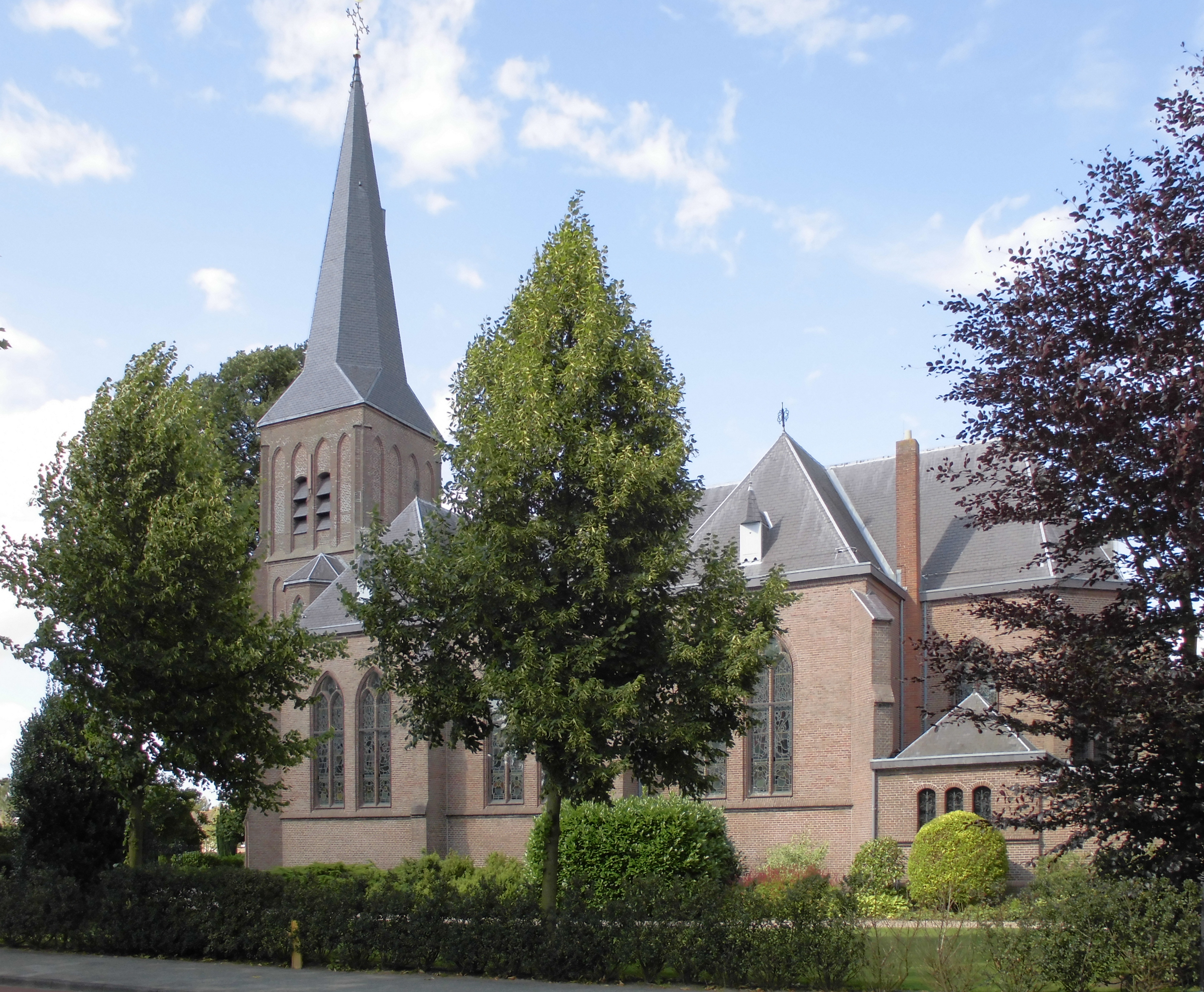
St. Anthony Church
