= Ulmus 'Stavast' =

Elm cultivar

- Genus: Ulmus
- Hybrid parentage: 'Commelin' × '202' (U. 'Exoniensis' × U. wallichiana)
- Cultivar: 'Stavast'
- Origin: Netherlands

Ulmus 'Stavast' is a Dutch hybrid elm cultivar raised at the Dorschkamp Research Institute for Forestry & Landscape Planning, Wageningen, as clone '622' from the crossing of 'Commelin' with clone '202', itself a hybrid of the Exeter Elm Ulmus 'Exoniensis' and Himalayan Elm Ulmus wallichiana.

== Description ==
The tree is distinguished by its dense root system.

== Pests and diseases ==
'Stavast' has only a moderate resistance to Dutch elm disease, rated 3 out of 5.

== Cultivation ==
'Stavast' has not been in commerce in its own right much. It was retained as a rootstock for the grafting of related elms like 'Dodoens', 'Plantyn', and 'Clusius' (cultivars now propagated by rooted cuttings), as its dense root-system quickly stabilized young trees. Specimens of the cultivar have been planted in the Netherlands, in the elm trial plantation at Lepelaarweg, Zeewolde, in the Het Egeltjesbos public park in the village of De Kwakel, Uithoorn (one tree), and among the lines of elms on the ‘s-Gravelandsevaartweg, Loosdrecht (10 trees, planted 2018), part of Wijdemeren City Council's elm collection, assembled since 2003 by tree manager Martin Tijdgat and his colleagues.

A number of 'Stavast' were exported to New Zealand for use in trials at the Hortresearch station at Palmerston North in the 1990s.

== Etymology ==
The name 'Stavast' is Dutch for "stand firmly", but is also used to describe someone of resolute character.
