= Ulmus 'Repura' =

Elm cultivar

- Genus: Ulmus
- Hybrid parentage: 'Regal' × (U. rubra × (U. pumila × U. davidiana var. japonica))
- Cultivar: 'Repura'
- Origin: US

Ulmus 'Repura' is an American cultivar raised by the Wisconsin Alumni Research Foundation (WARF) as selection '1193-4', derived from a crossing of 'Regal' (female parent) and a crossing of Ulmus rubra with the hybrid Ulmus pumila × Ulmus davidiana var. japonica.

== Description ==
Not available.

== Pests and diseases ==
'Repura' has not been thoroughly tested for resistance to Dutch elm disease.

== Cultivation ==
Registered in 1993 as 'Repura' by Conrad Appel KG, of Darmstadt, Germany, (ceased trading 2005), the tree is unlikely to be commercially released in either the United States or Europe.

== Accessions ==
Not known.
