= Ulmus 'Regal' =

Elm cultivar

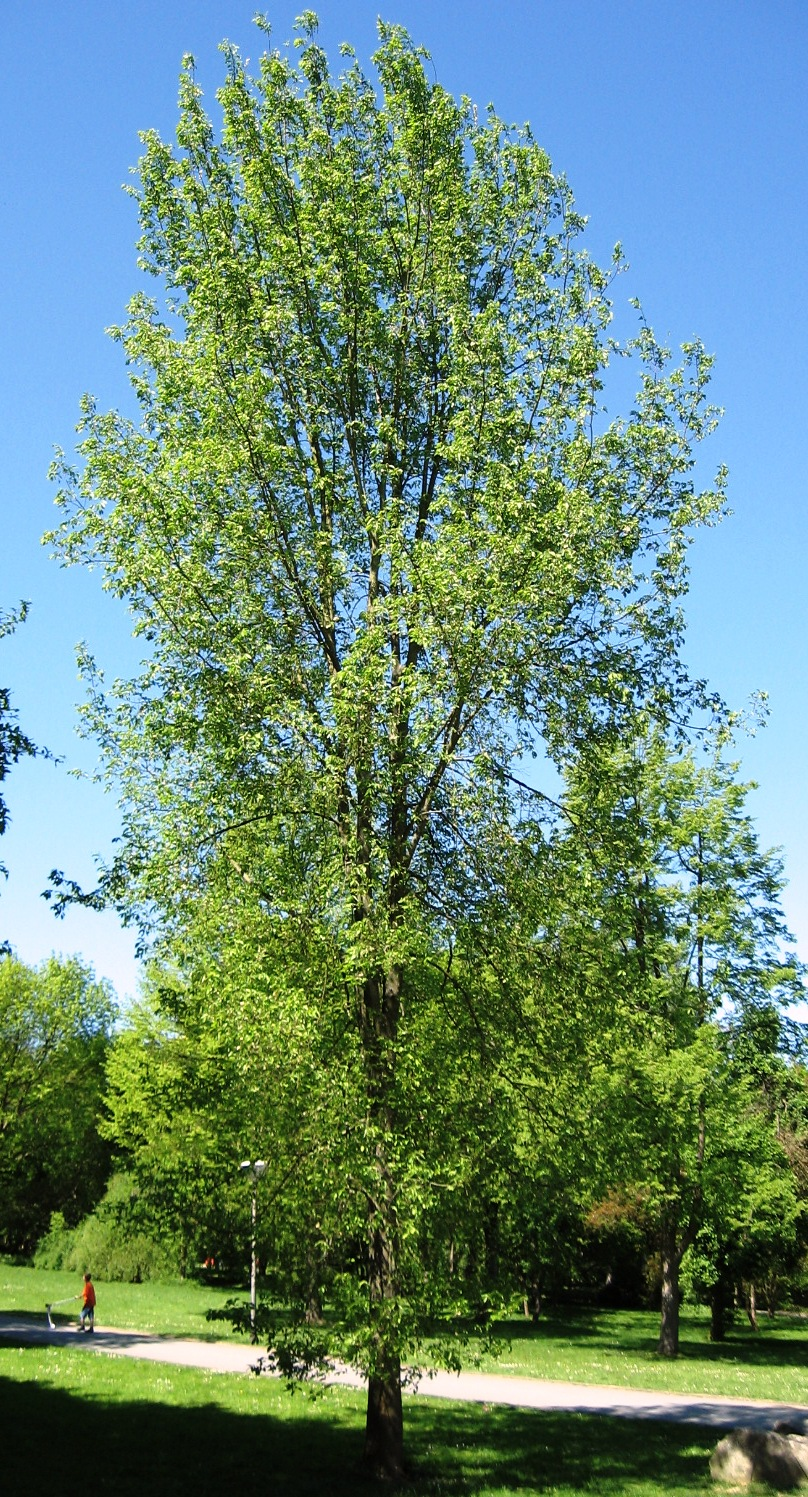
- 'Regal', Dortmund.
- Genus: Ulmus
- Hybrid parentage: 'Commelin' × '215' (U. pumila 'Pinnato-ramosa' × U. minor 'Hoersholmiensis')
- Cultivar: 'Regal'
- Origin: US

Ulmus 'Regal' is an American hybrid elm cultivar developed by the University of Wisconsin–Madison and released in 1983. 'Regal' was derived from seeds arising from the crossing of the Dutch hybrid clones 'Commelin' and '215' (U. pumila 'Pinnato-ramosa' × U. minor 'Hoersholmiensis') sent in 1960 by Hans M. Heybroek of the Dorschkamp Research Institute for Forestry & Landscape Planning, Wageningen, Netherlands.

== Description ==
'Regal' has a strong central leader bestowing an upright columnar form similar to 'Commelin', making it particularly suitable for street planting. The foliage is distinctively sparse, allowing dappled sunlight beneath the canopy . The leaves are narrowly elliptical, 5 cm to 10 cm in length, fern green when young, changing to a glossy, trichome-free, dusky spinach green. The perfect, wind-pollinated apetalous flowers emerge in early March.

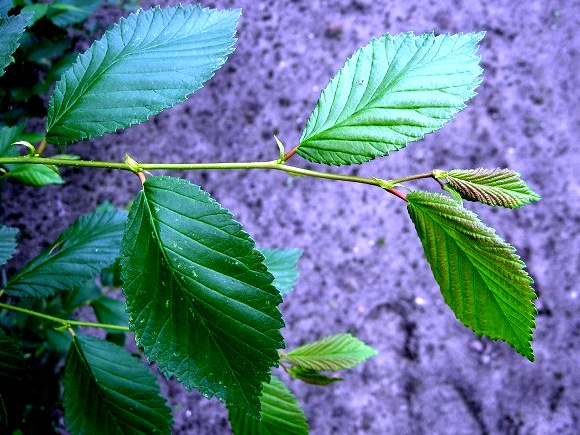
'Regal' leaves

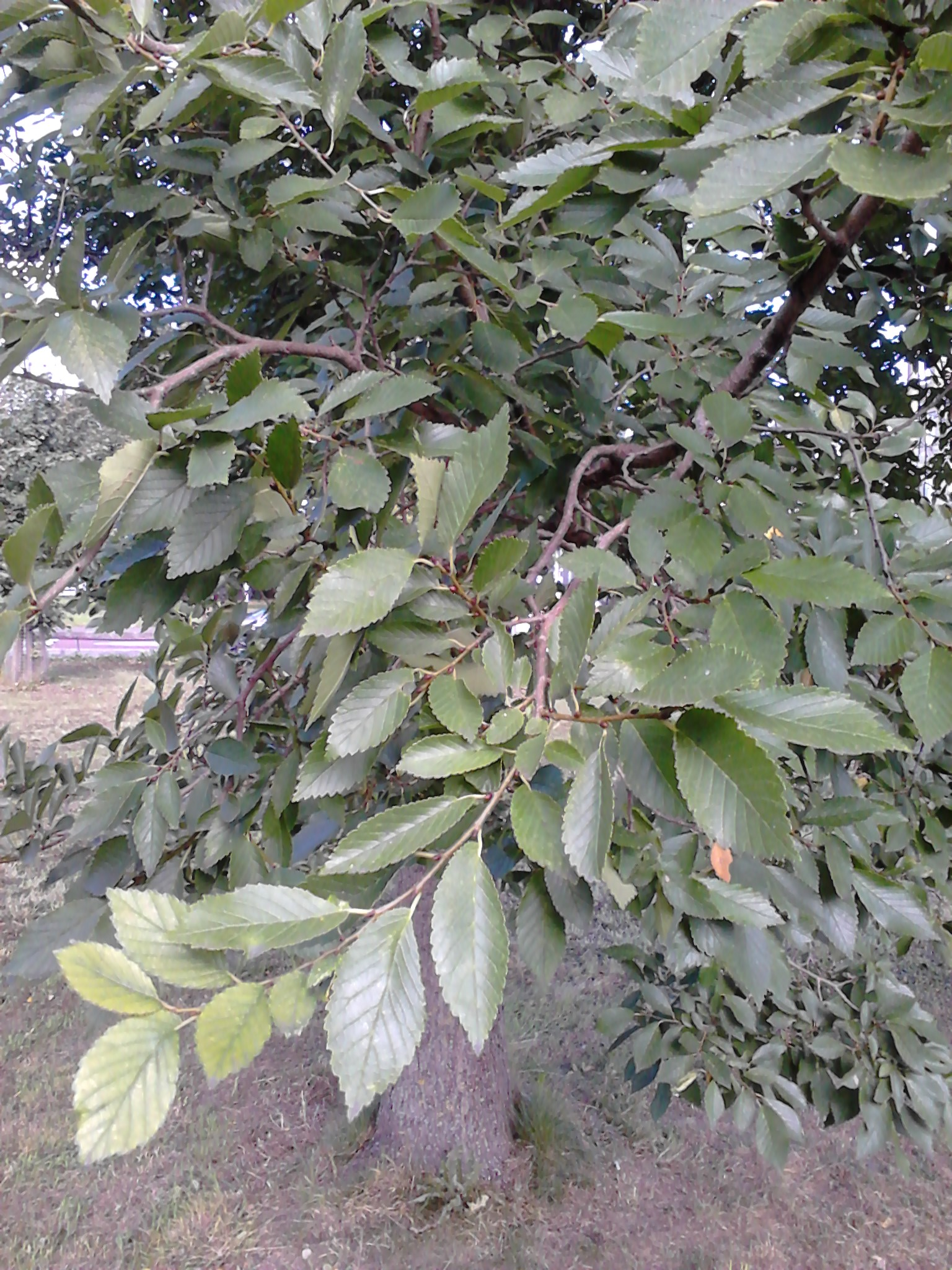
'Regal' foliage

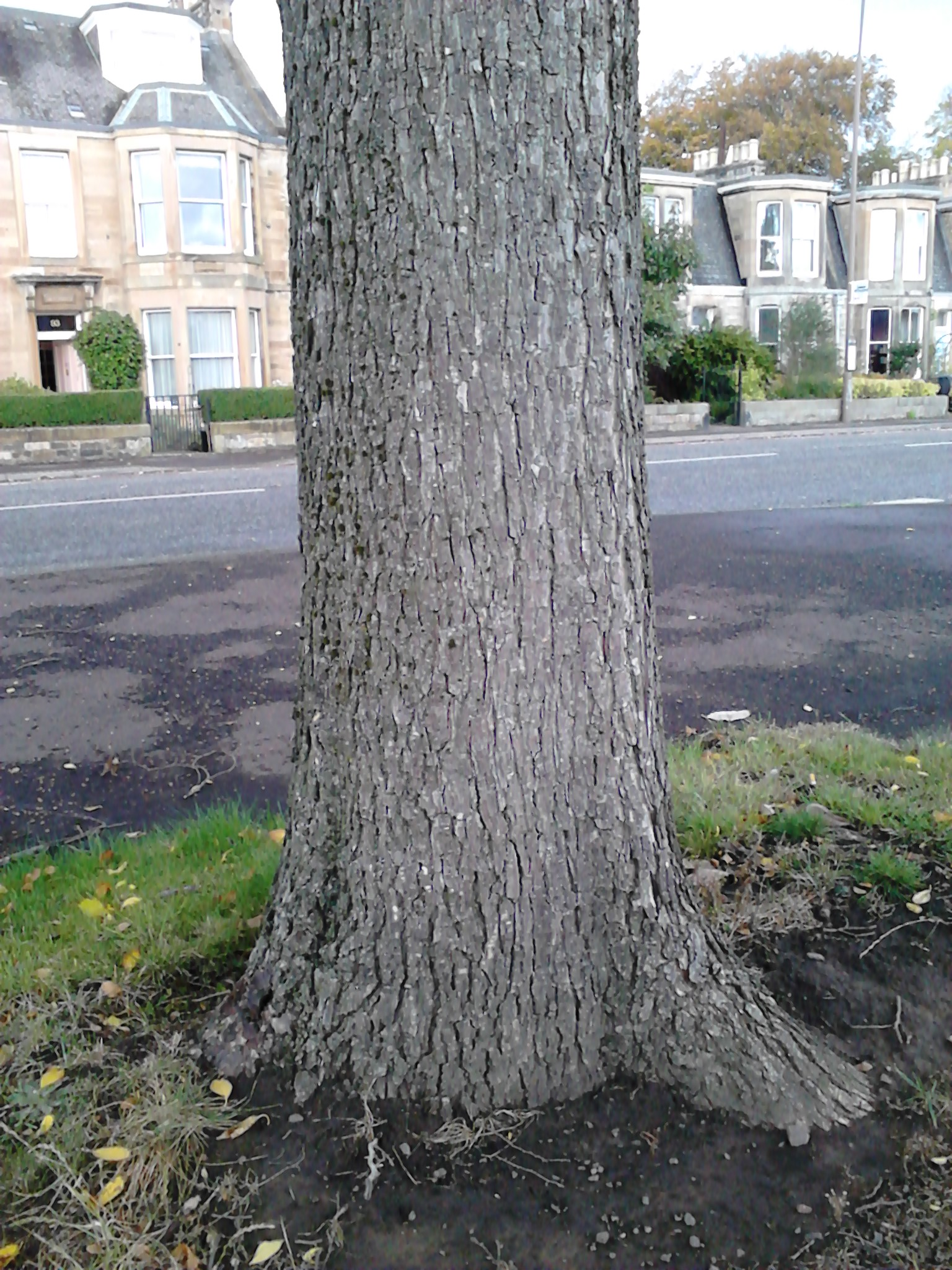
'Regal' bole

== Pests and diseases ==
'Regal' has a good resistance, rated 4 out of 5, to Dutch elm disease and verticillium wilt, but is very susceptible to the elm leaf beetle Xanthogaleruca luteola in the United States. The tree's foliage was adjudged 'resistant' to black spot by the Plant Diagnostic Clinic of the University of Missouri.

== Cultivation ==
The tree performed particularly well in the Northern Arizona University trials where, along with 'Frontier', it proved very tolerant of the hot and arid conditions in the eastern part of Arizona, exhibiting minimal leaf scorch. In Europe, 'Regal' was introduced by the now-defunct Conrad-Appel nursery in Darmstadt and grown under licence by several Dutch and German nurseries as one of the Resista series. It has enjoyed modest success in Germany as a street tree , but remains uncommon in the UK, where it was introduced by the Conservation Foundation and marketed for a few years by Crowder's Nursery, near Lincoln. 'Regal' was planted in the Royal Horticultural Society's garden at Harlow Carr, North Yorkshire. It was trialled by Edinburgh Council, and many healthy specimens survive in the city. 'Regal' also featured in trials in New Zealand during the 1990s at the Hortresearch station, Palmerston North.

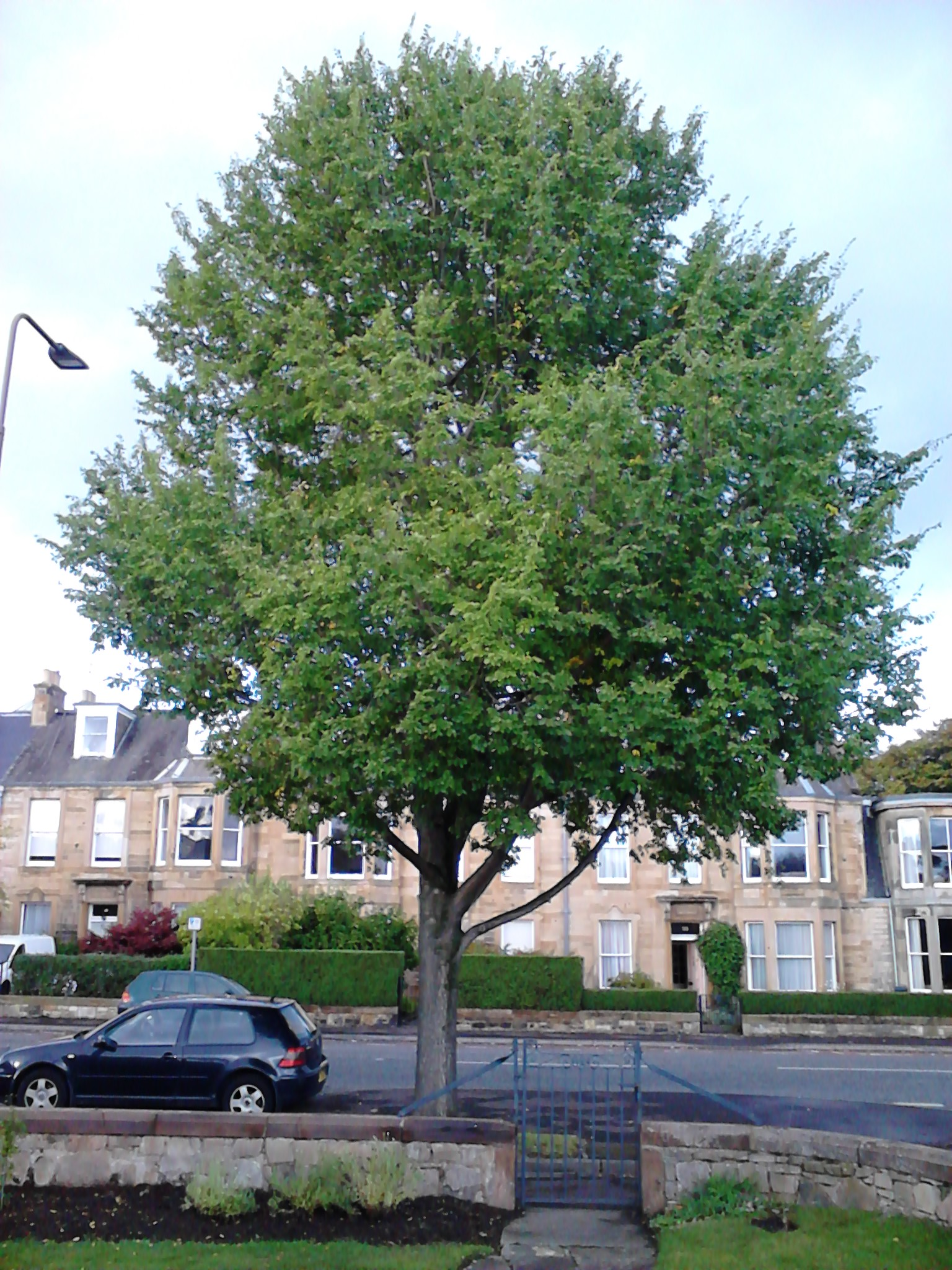
'Regal', Craigleith Rd, Edinburgh

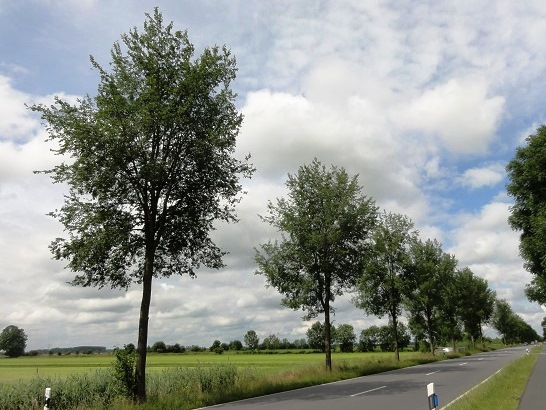
'Regal' along a German highway

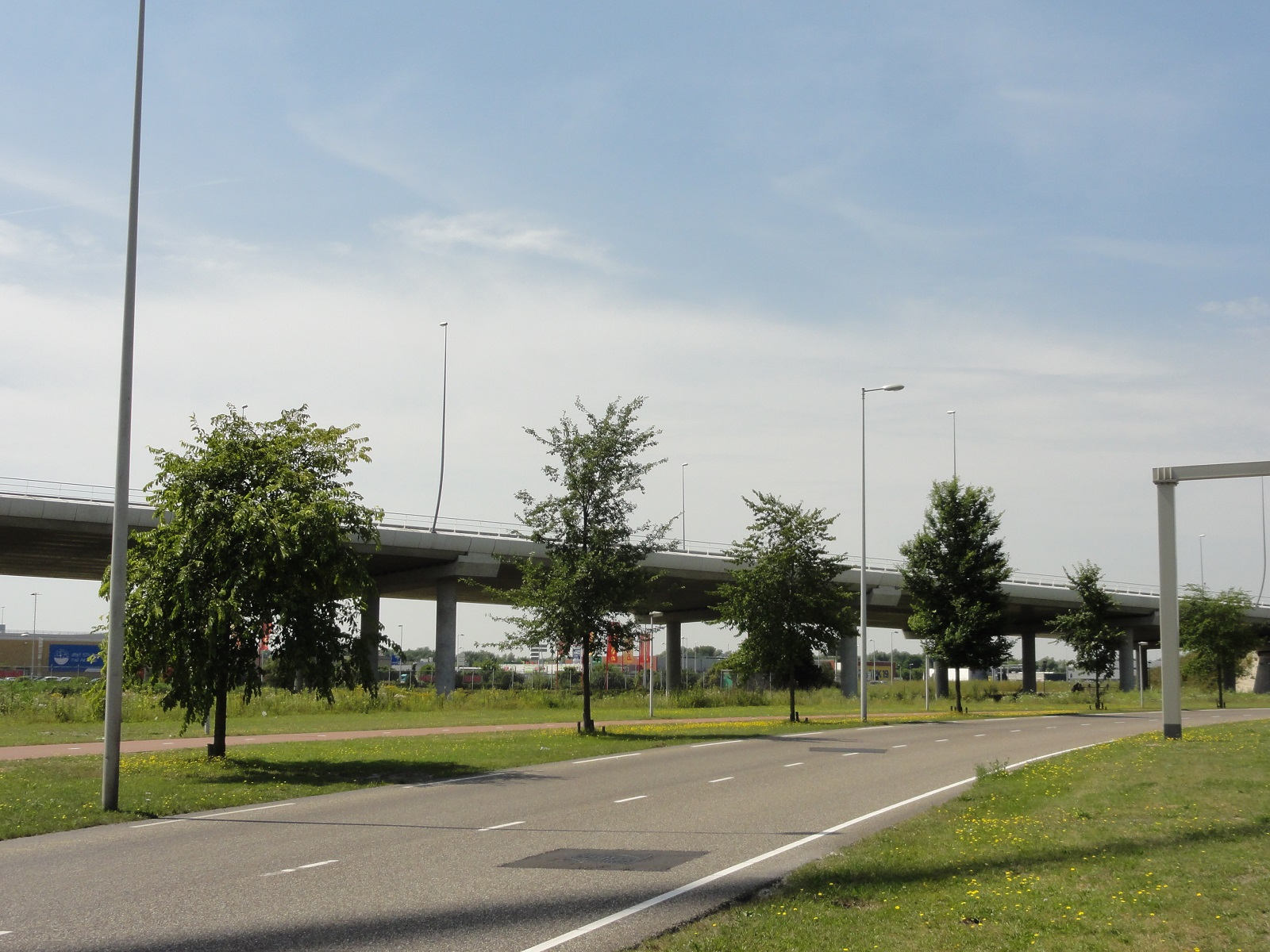
Elm cultivars, Netherlands; 'Regal' 2nd from left

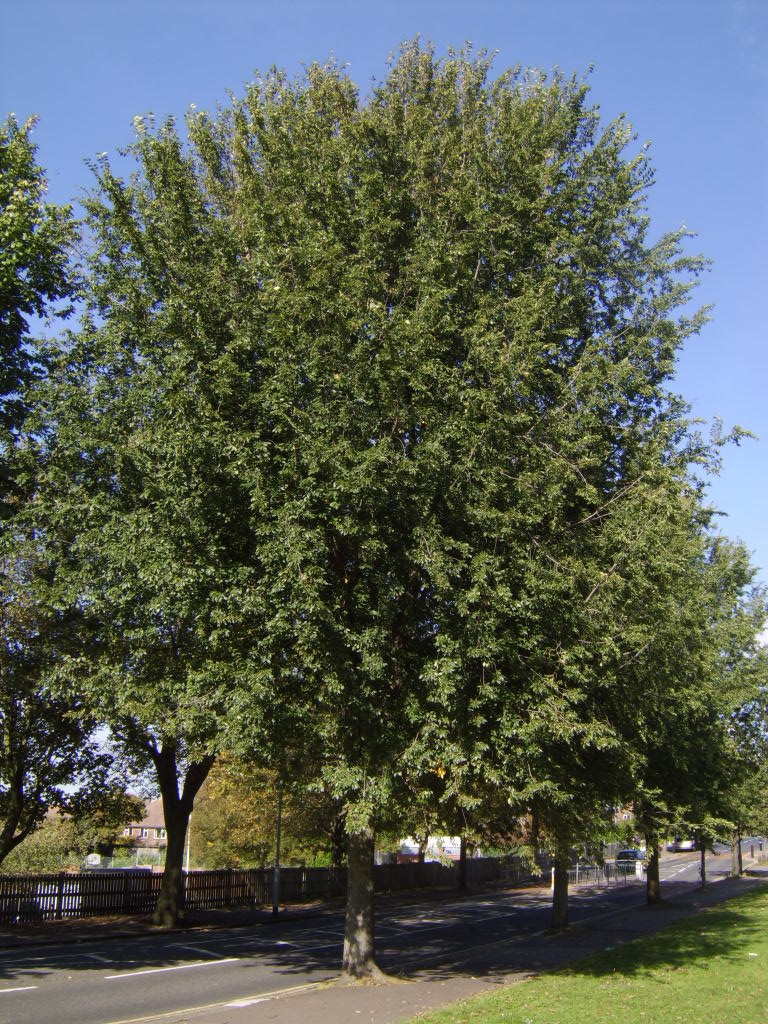
'Regal' in Daleview Gardens, Hove (2008)

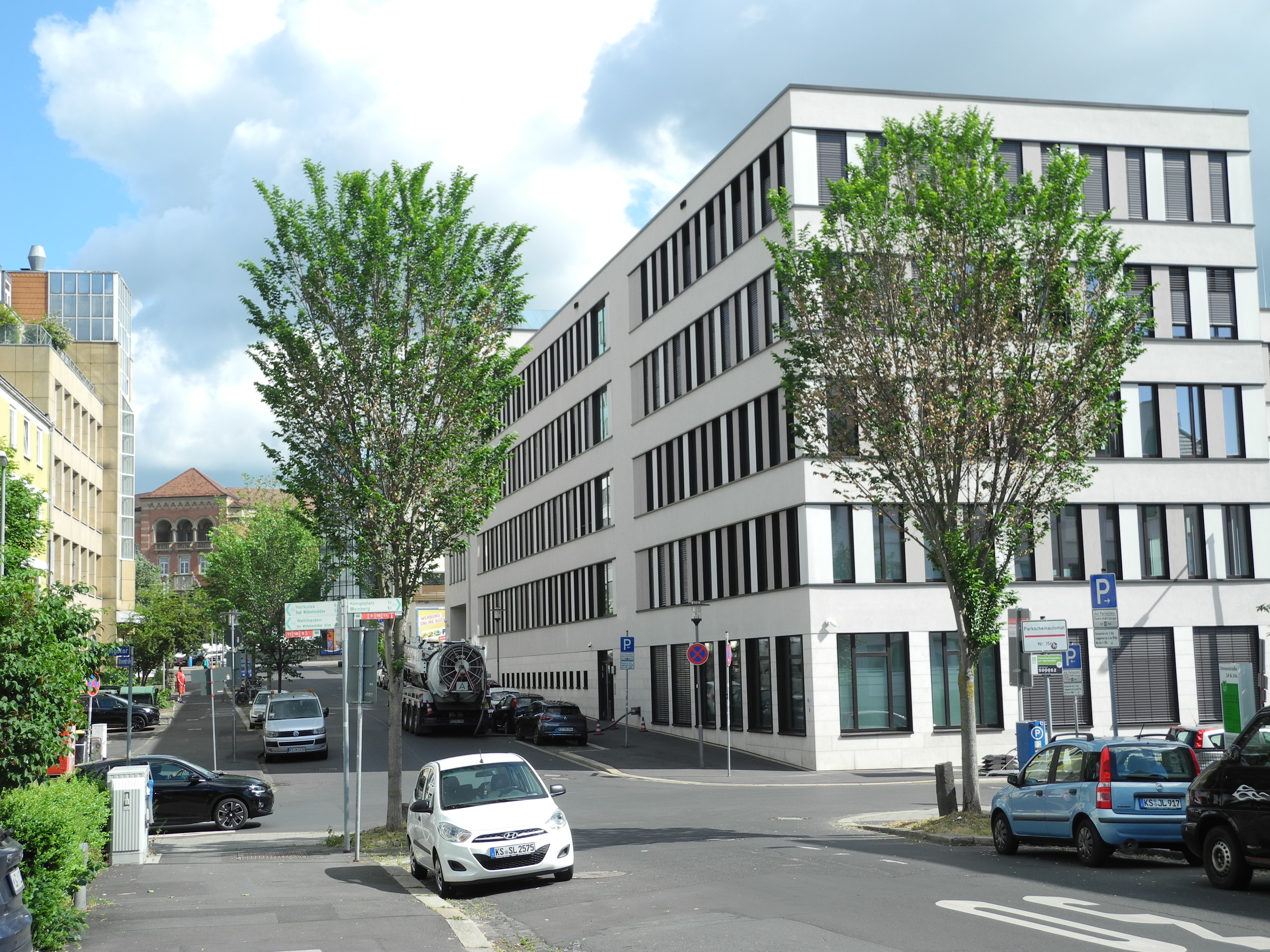
'Regal' by Königstor, Kassel, Hessen (2022)

== Notable trees ==
The UK TROBI champion is at Abbey Park, Leicester, measuring 14 m high, 26 cm d.b.h. in 2004.

== Hybrid cultivars ==
- 'Repura', 'Revera'

== Accessions ==
=== North America ===
- Chicago Botanic Garden, US. 3 trees, no other details available.
- Holden Arboretum, US. Acc. no. 85–189

=== Europe ===
- Brighton & Hove City Council, UK. NCCPG Elm Collection. Some very big trees in Hangleton, Hove.
- Cambridge Botanic Garden , UK. No accession details available.
- Grange Farm Arboretum, Lincolnshire, UK.
- Rombergpark, Dortmund, Germany. Details not known.
- Royal Horticultural Society Harlow Carr Arboretum , Harrogate, UK. Planted 1988.
- Wijdemeren City Council, Netherlands. Elm collection. Planted in 2015 in Nederhorst den Berg (Randweg, Vincent van Goghstraat, Pieter de Hooghweg).

== Nurseries ==
North America

- Johnson's Nursery , Menomonee Falls, Wisconsin, US.
- Klyn Nurseries, Perry, Ohio, US.
- Lake County Nursery , Perry, Ohio, US.
- Sun Valley Garden Centre, Eden Prairie, Minnesota, US.

Europe

- Eisele GmbH & Co KG, Darmstadt, Germany.
- Noordplant , Glimmen, Netherlands.
- Pan-Global Plants , Frampton-on-Severn, Gloucestershire, UK.
