= Kortenhoefse Plassen =

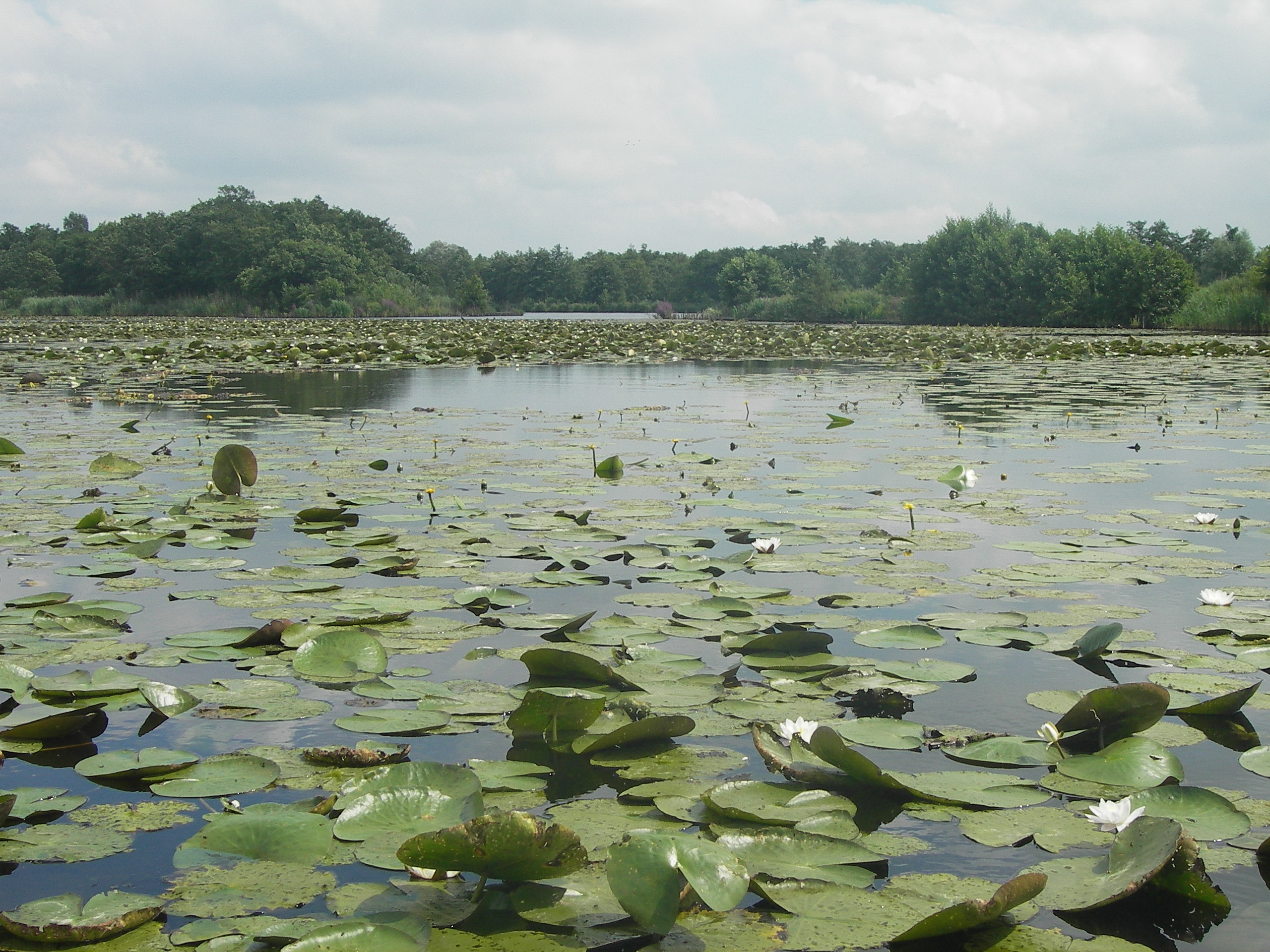
Water lilies in the Kortenhoefse Plassen

The Kortenhoefse Plassen is a nature reserve in Wijdemeren that is managed by Natuurmonumenten. A mix of lakes, wetlands and strips of historical farmlands form a special nature area. Because these bodies of water are located near the higher ground of the Gooi, the seepage of clean, nutrient-poor groundwater results in the growth of unusual plants such as marsh marigold. The water is filled with water lily in the summertime, and in the wintertime the shallow waters are one of the first to freeze over, making it a popular venue for ice skating.

The area is protected from motorboats for the sake of the birds and other wildlife, but there is walking path and a 10-kilometer canoe route with signage.
