= Ulmus × hollandica 'Commelin' =

Elm cultivar

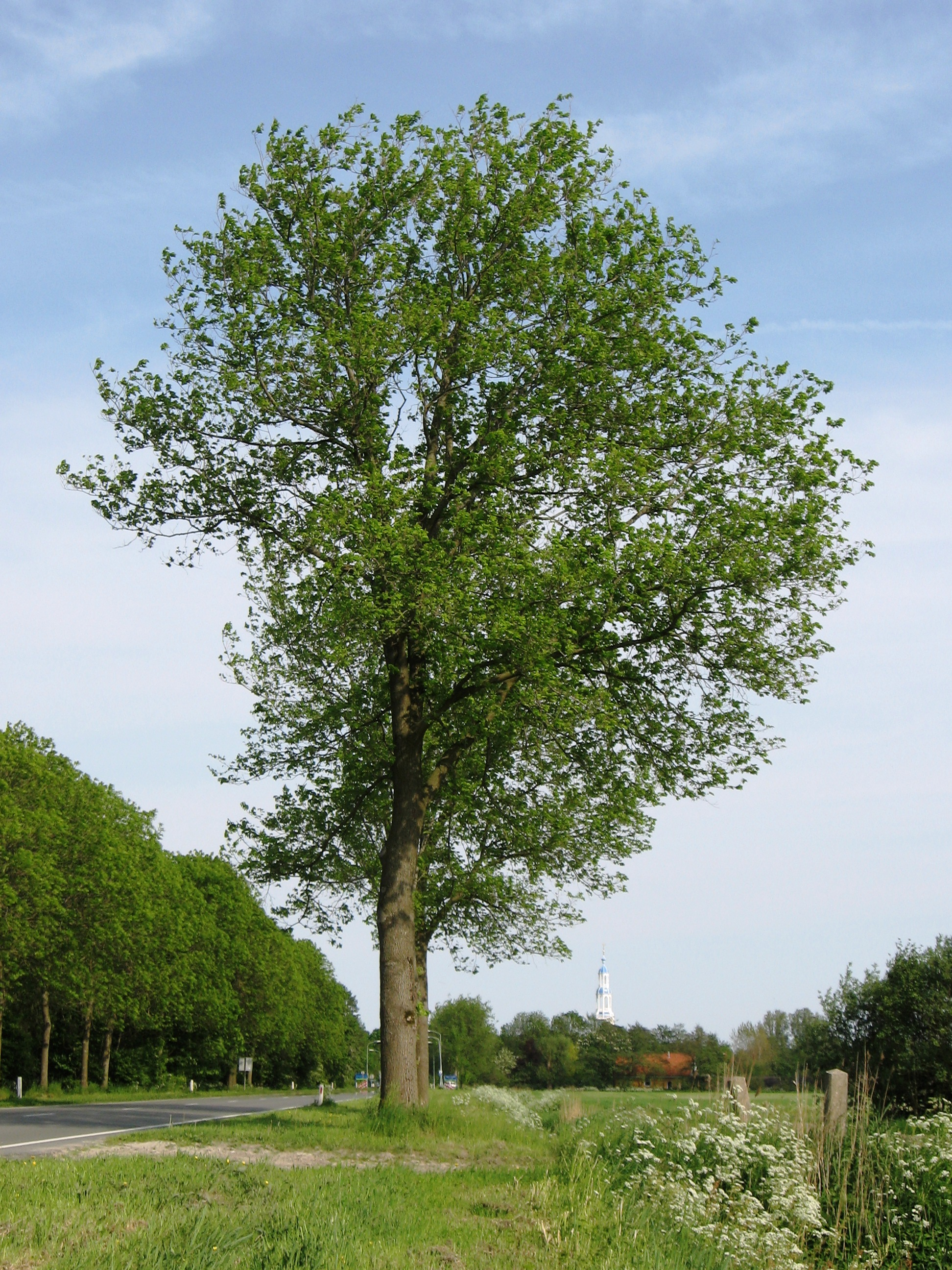
- 'Commelin'; Uithuizermeeden, Netherlands.
- Hybrid parentage: U. × hollandica 'Vegeta' × U. minor
- Cultivar: 'Commelin'
- Origin: Baarn, The Netherlands

Ulmus × hollandica 'Commelin' is a Dutch hybrid cultivar released for sale in 1960. The tree was raised at Baarn as clone 274 by the Foundation Willie Commelin Scholten Phytopathological Laboratory in 1940, from a crossing of Ulmus × hollandica 'Vegeta' and clone 1, an Ulmus minor selected from a 1929 elm seedlings lot obtained from the Barbier nursery, Orléans.

== Description ==
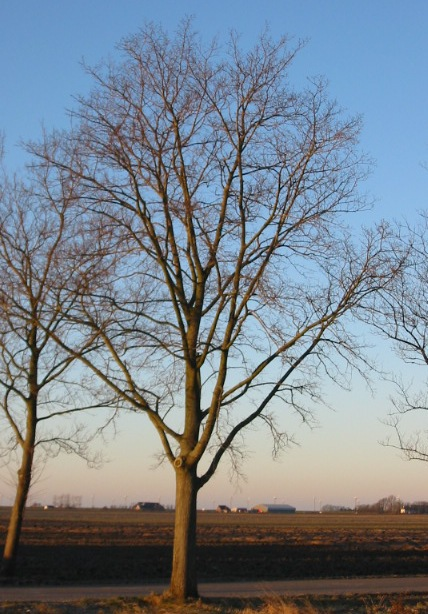
'Commelin' in winter, Klaas Wiersumweg, Roodeschool, Groningen, the Netherlands

A fast-growing, attractively shaped tree distinguished by its small pale-green leaves with bright venation and a slight blue-grey color distinction from ‘Vegeta’. The leaf shape is typically elliptic, with a short acuminate apex. The leaves are sparsely arranged and fall significantly later than those of 'Vegeta'.

== Pests and diseases ==
Although resistant to the original strain of Dutch elm disease, Ophiostoma ulmi and a range of other ailments, 'Commelin' proved very susceptible to the later, aggressive strain Ophiostoma novo-ulmi subsp. americana.

== Cultivation ==
'Commelin' initially enjoyed considerable commercial success and over 500,000 had been sold by 1974. However, the tree had only been screened for non-aggressive or semi-aggressive isolates of the causal fungus of Dutch elm disease. When its low resistance to the new strain of the disease became apparent, sales plummeted, and only 500 were sold in 1990. However, neither 'Commelin' nor its slightly less vulnerable contemporary 'Groeneveld' had sold in great numbers beyond the Netherlands, although it was later used in hybridization experiments in the United States as female parent of several cultivars. Among older specimens in the Netherlands are eleven in Parklaan and one in Zuidsingel, Kortenhoef (2024), two at 1 Spiegelweg, Nederhorst den Berg, and one on Zijdelweg, Uithoorn, planted among a group of 'Vegeta' and distinguished by its blueish leaves. Two specimens were planted in 2019 on Strand Wijde Blik, Kortenhoef, as part of Wijdemeren City Council's elm collection.

== Notable trees ==
The UK TROBI Champion is at Ashton Rise in Brighton, measuring 22 m high by 55 cm d.b.h. in 2009.

== Hybrid cultivars ==
- 'Homestead', 'Regal', 'Stavast', 'Urban'.

== Etymology ==
The cultivar is named for Jan Commelin, a Dutch botanist of the 17th century.

== Accessions ==
=== North America ===
- Bartlett Tree Experts, US. No details available
- Holden Arboretum, US. No details available
- Morton Arboretum, US. Acc. no. 69–70

=== Europe ===
- Brighton & Hove City Council, UK. NCCPG Elm Collection holders.
- Grange Farm Arboretum , Sutton St. James, Spalding, Lincs., UK. Acc. no. 840.

== Nurseries ==
=== Europe ===
- Boomwekerijen 'De Batterijen', Ochten, Netherlands.
- Lorenz von Ehren , Hamburg, Germany
- Noordplant , Glimmen, Netherlands.
- PlantenTuin Esveld , Boskoop, Netherlands.
- Standard Trees , Golden Cross, East Sussex, UK.
- Westerveld Boomkwekerij B.V., Opheusden, Netherlands. (as U. hollandica 'Commelin')
