= Ulmus 'Homestead' =

Elm cultivar

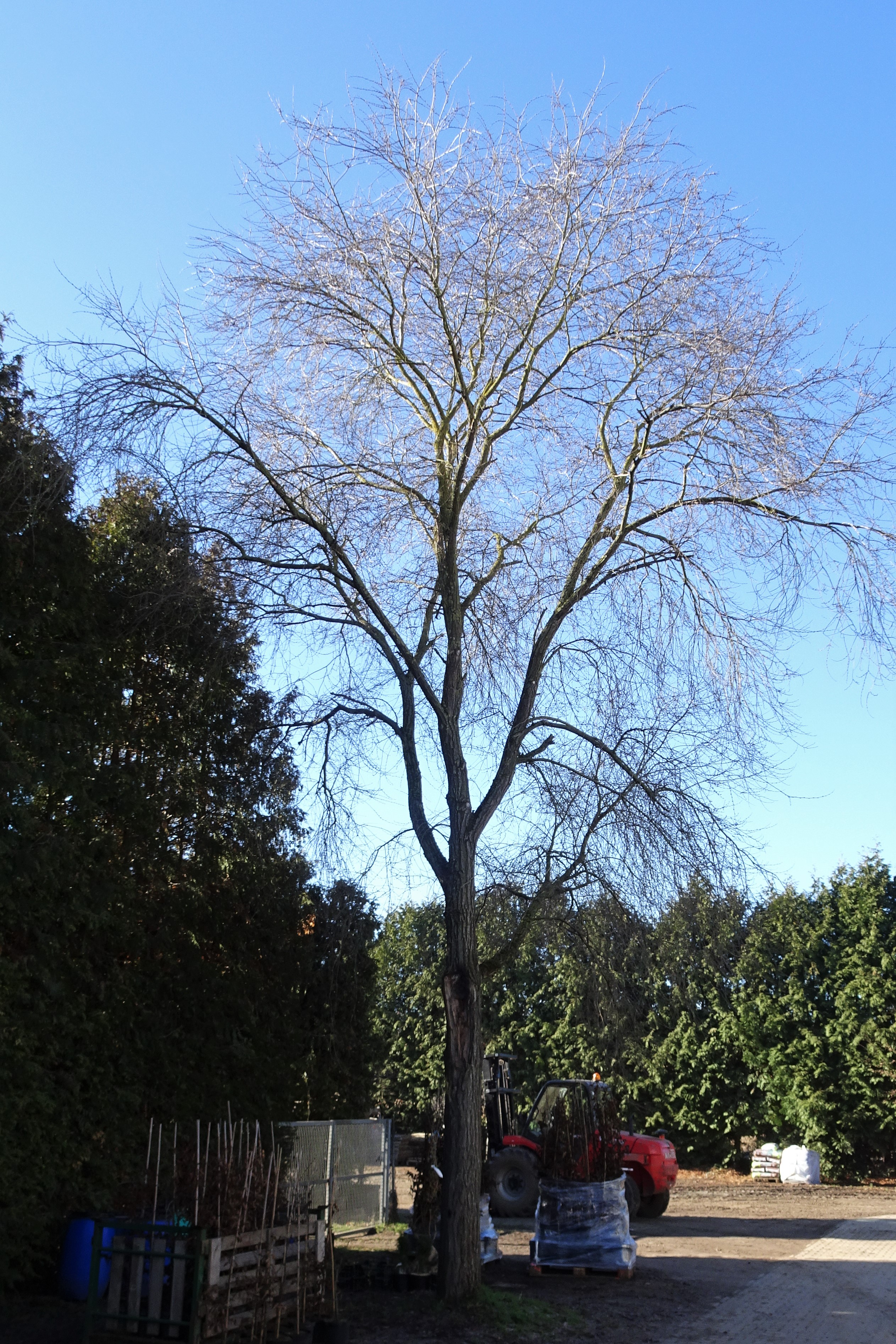
- 'Homestead', Darmstadt, Germany
- Genus: Ulmus
- Hybrid parentage: U. pumila × ('Commelin' × (U. pumila 'Pinnato-ramosa' × U. minor 'Hoersholmiensis'))
- Cultivar: 'Homestead'
- Origin: US

Ulmus 'Homestead' is an American hybrid elm cultivar raised by Alden Townsend of the United States National Arboretum at the Nursery Crops Laboratory in Delaware, Ohio. The cultivar arose from a 1970 crossing of the Siberian Elm Ulmus pumila (female parent) with the hybrid N 215 ('Commelin' × (U. pumila 'Pinnato-ramosa' × U. minor 'Hoersholmiensis')), the latter grown from seed sent in 1960 to the University of Wisconsin-Madison elm breeding team by Hans Heybroek of the De Dorschkamp Research Institute in the Netherlands. Tested in the US National Elm Trial coordinated by Colorado State University, 'Homestead' averaged a survival rate of 85% after 10 years in the US National Elm Trial. However, planting of the tree was discouraged, owing principally to its 'ugly' shape and susceptibility to Southwest injury. 'Homestead' was released to commerce without patent restrictions in 1984.

== Description ==
The tree rapidly produces very upright growth, increasing in height by as much as 2 m per annum, forming a pyramidal crown bearing dark green leaves < 7 cm long by 3.5 cm broad which turn straw yellow in autumn; the bark is dark grey. The perfect, apetalous wind-pollinated flowers appear in early March. The tree's ultimate height should be around 20 m, with a spread of 12 m.

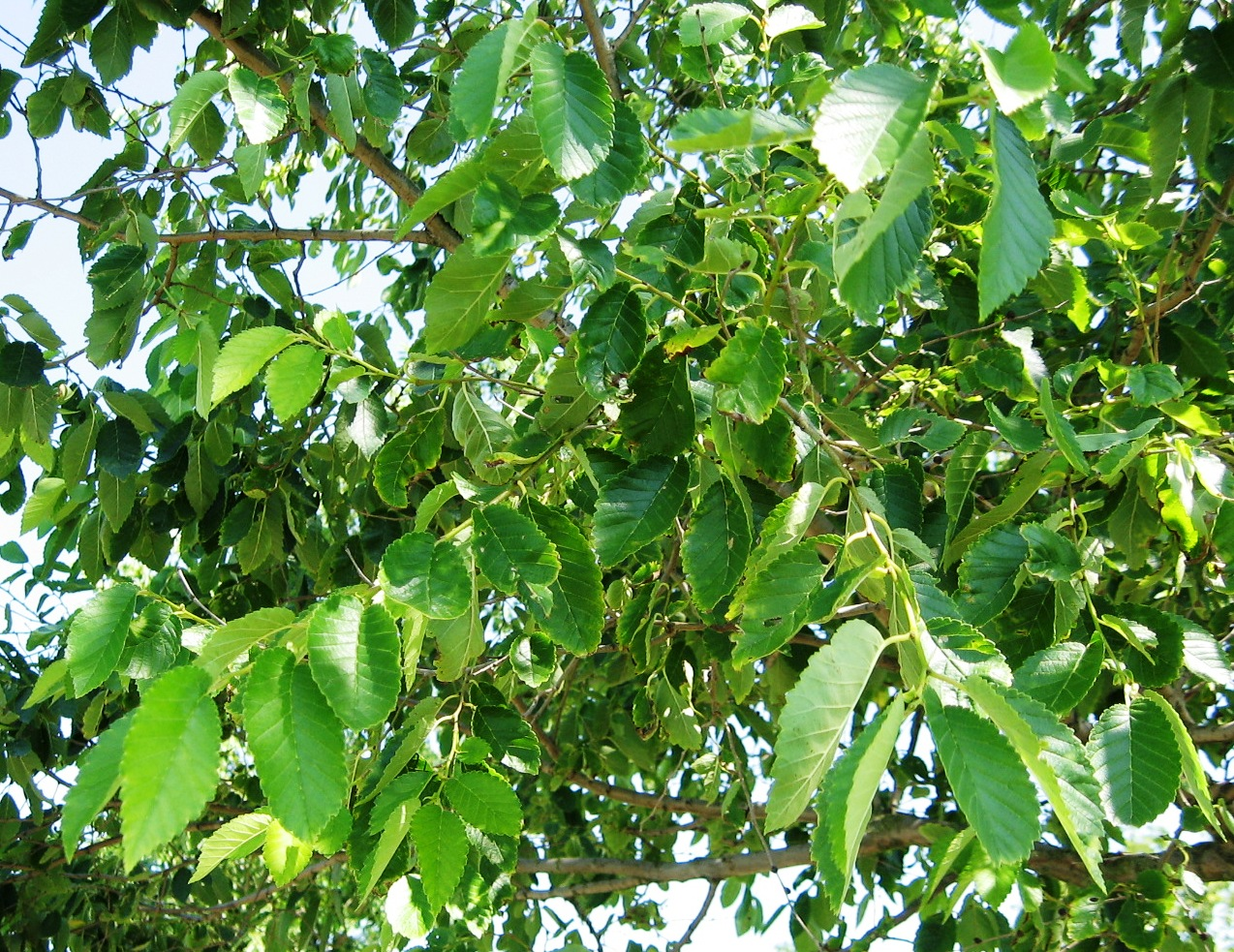
'Homestead' foliage

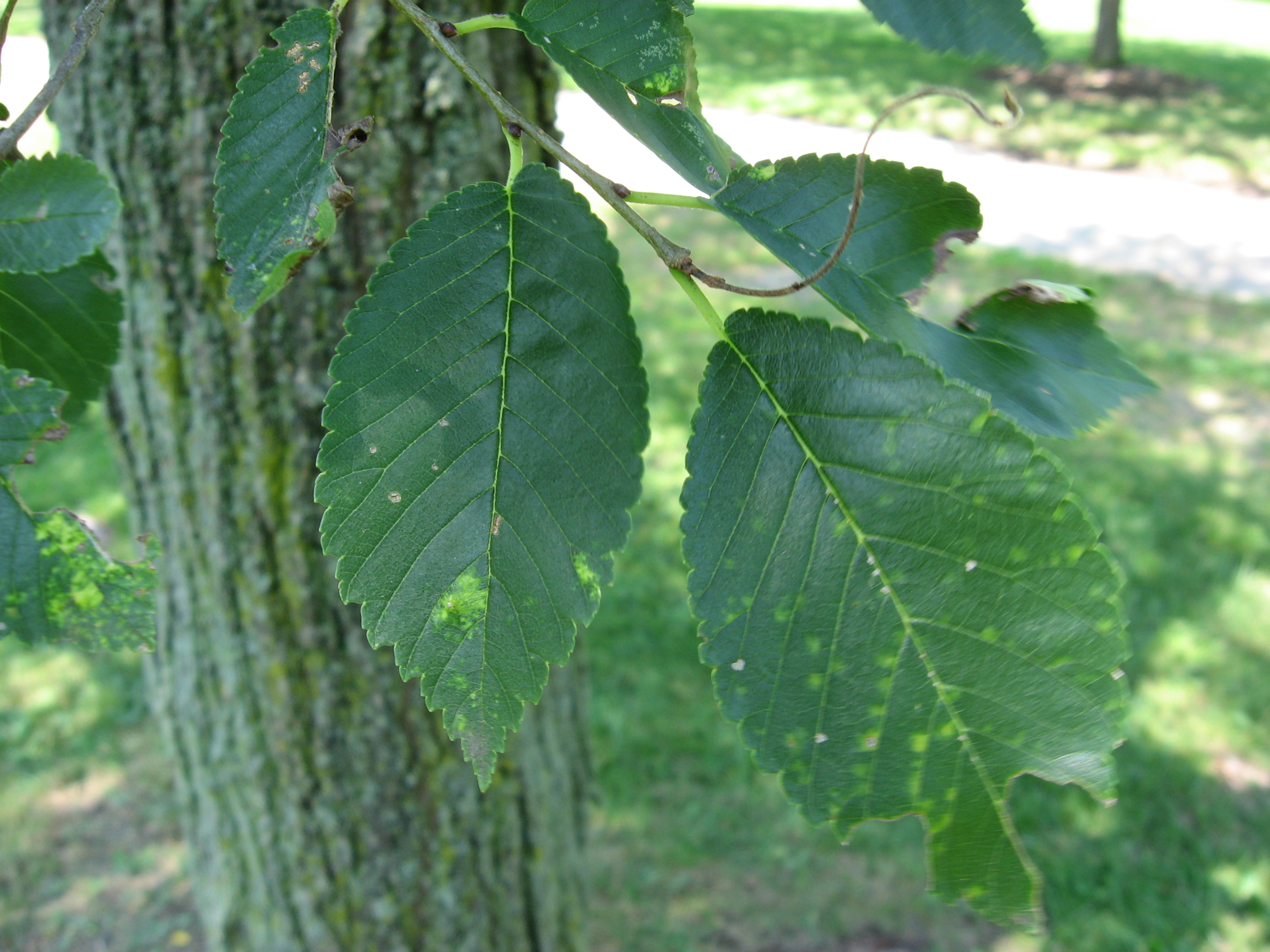
'Homestead' long shoot

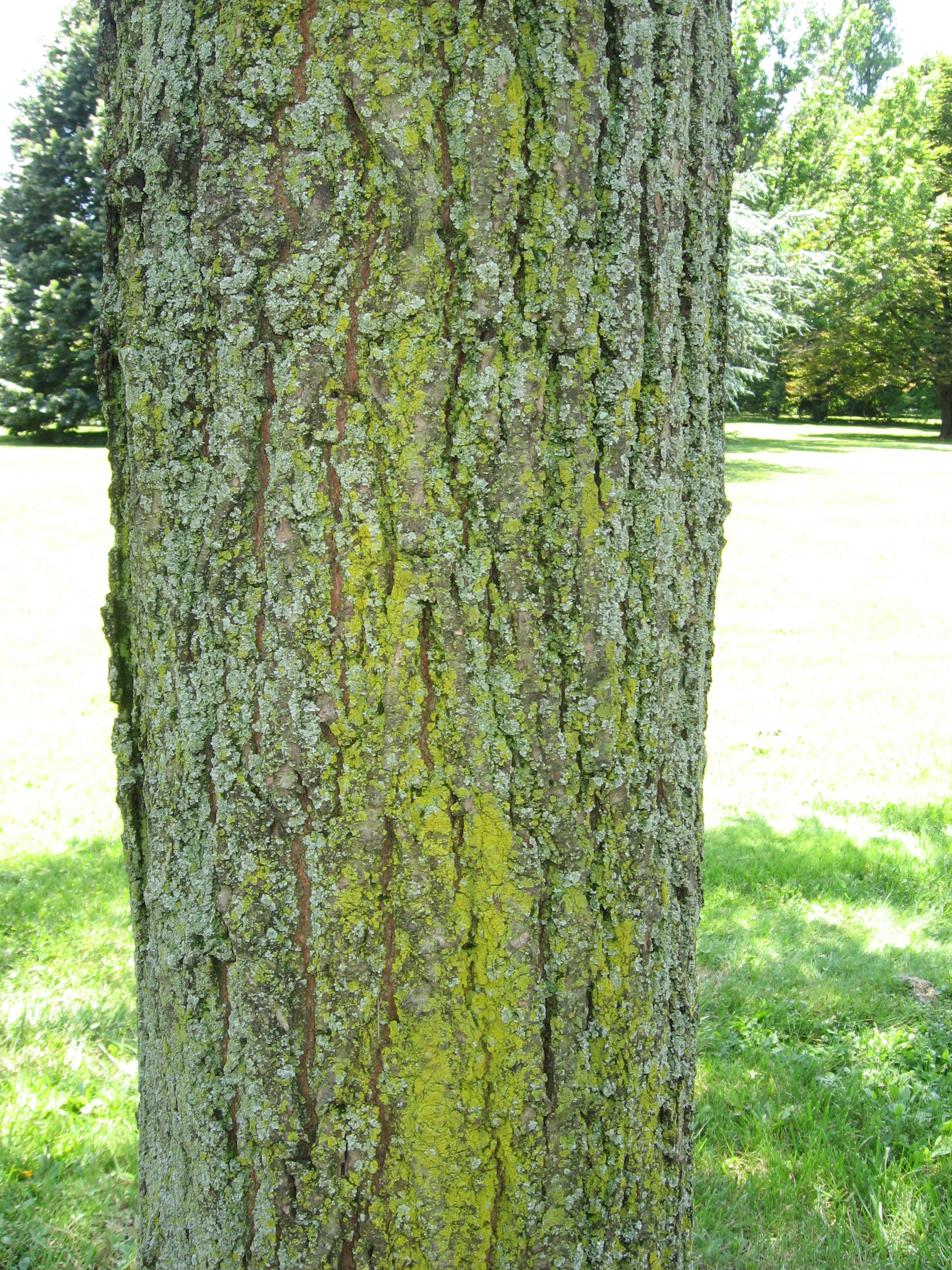
'Homestead' young bark

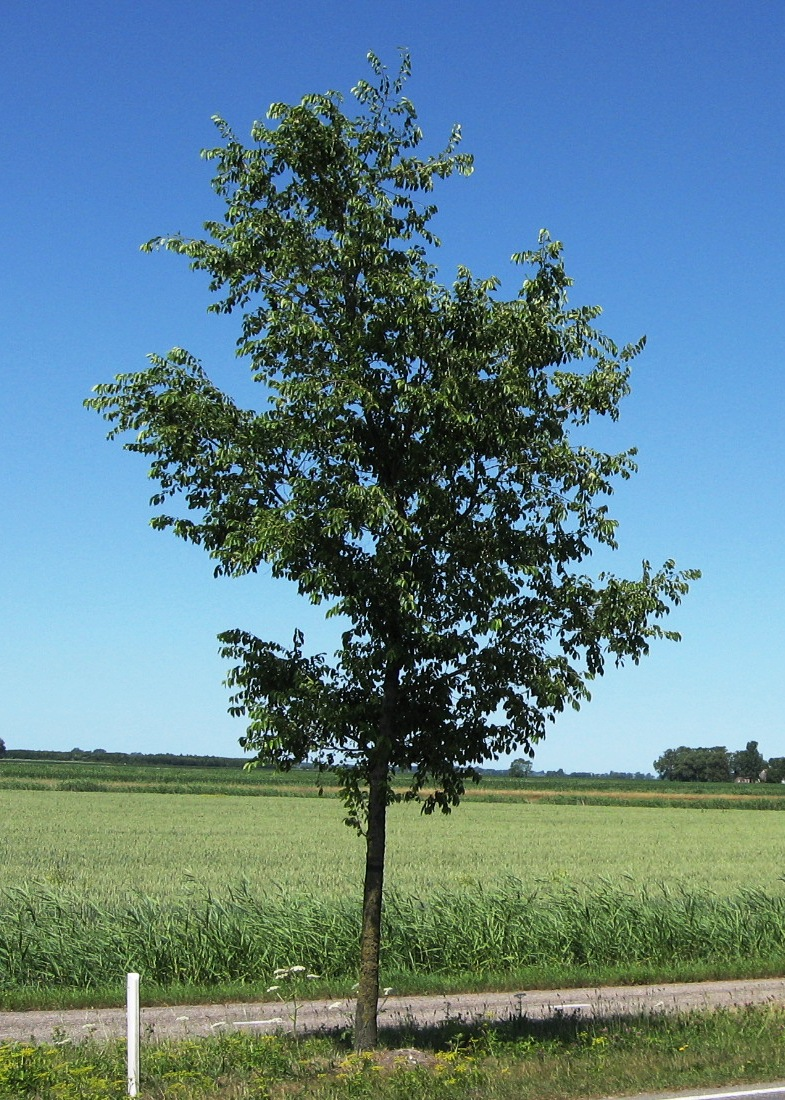
Juvenile 'Homestead' as roadside tree in Netherlands

== Pests and diseases ==
'Homestead' has a high resistance, rated 4–5 out of 5, to Dutch elm disease, but can be heavily to severely damaged by the elm leaf beetle Xanthogaleruca luteola and Japanese beetle in the US. 'Homestead' appears highly resistant to elm yellows, and was adjudged "resistant" to black spot by the Plant Diagnostic Clinic of the University of Missouri .

== Cultivation ==
The tree proved intolerant of hot and arid conditions in eastern Arizona, where it exhibited high (> 50%) of dieback in trials conducted by Northern Arizona University . Trials conducted by the University of Minnesota confirmed the tree's susceptibility to sun scorch, and its vulnerability to cambial damage over winter, although neither failing appeared to affect its long-term performance. The tree is currently being evaluated in the National Elm Trial coordinated by Colorado State University. Six 'Homestead', planted 2004, line the walkway to the arch of Weatherford Hall, Oregon State University, Corvallis.

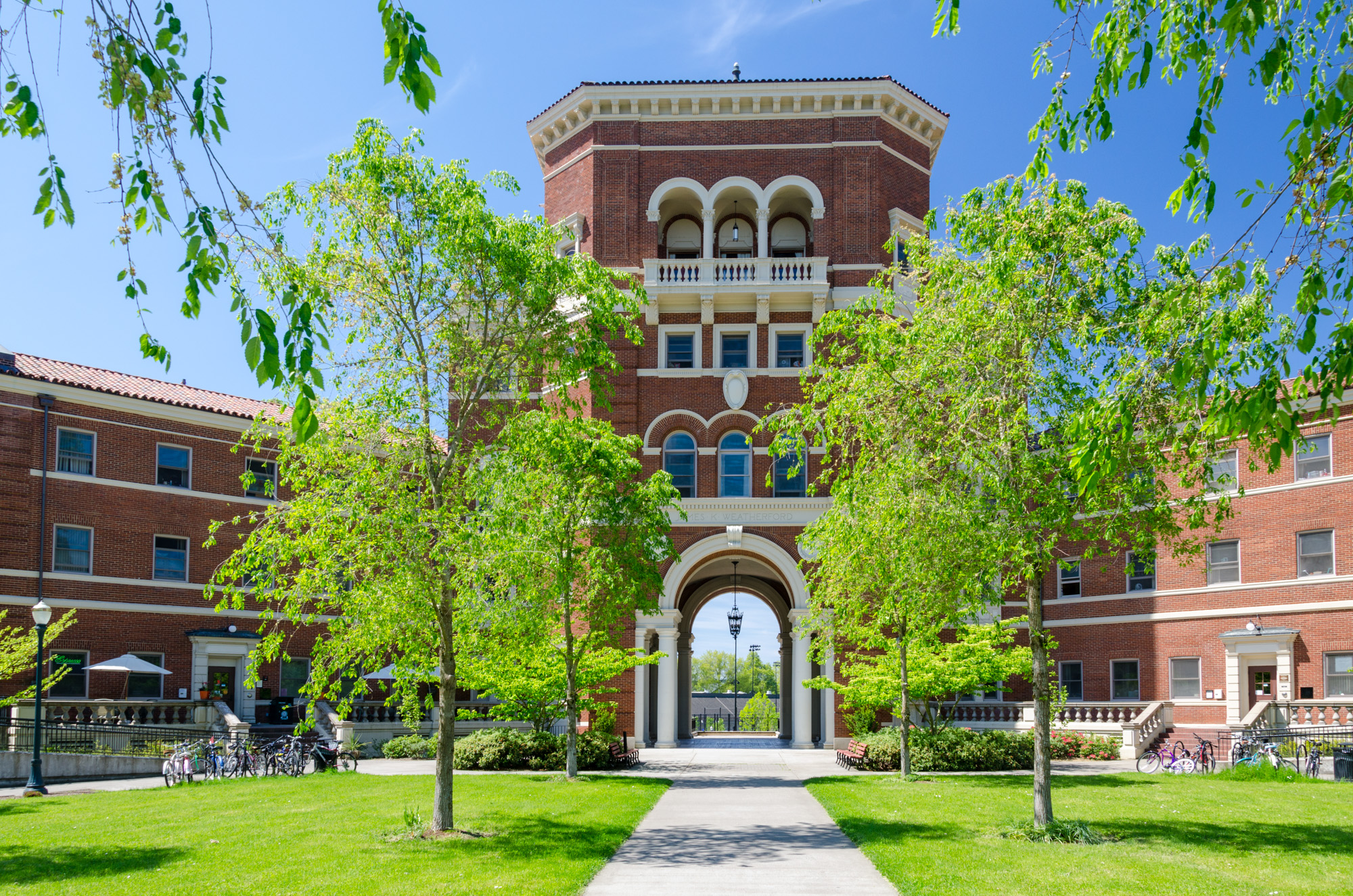
'Homestead' before Weatherford Hall, Oregon State University, Corvallis (May 2012)

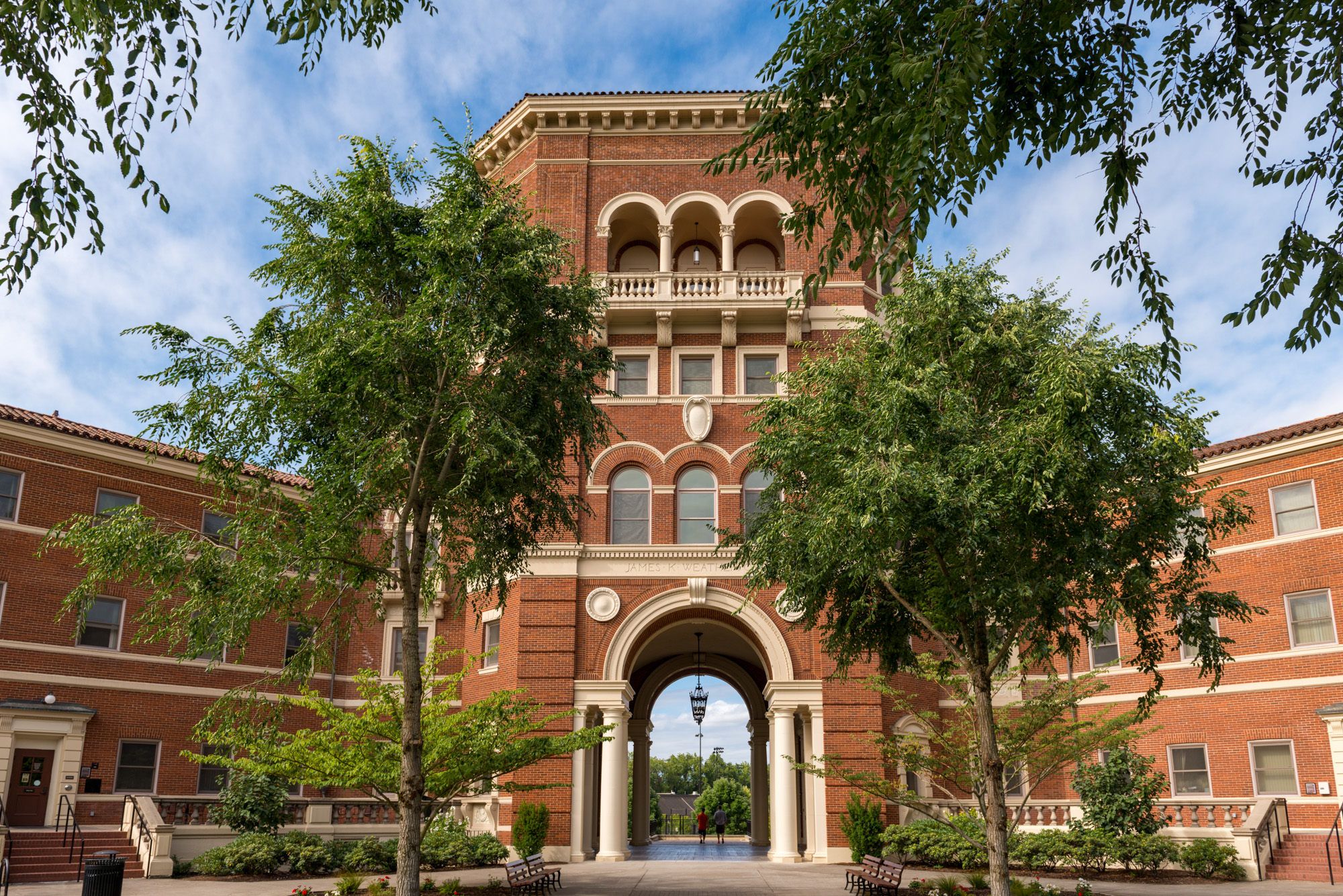
Same (August 2015)

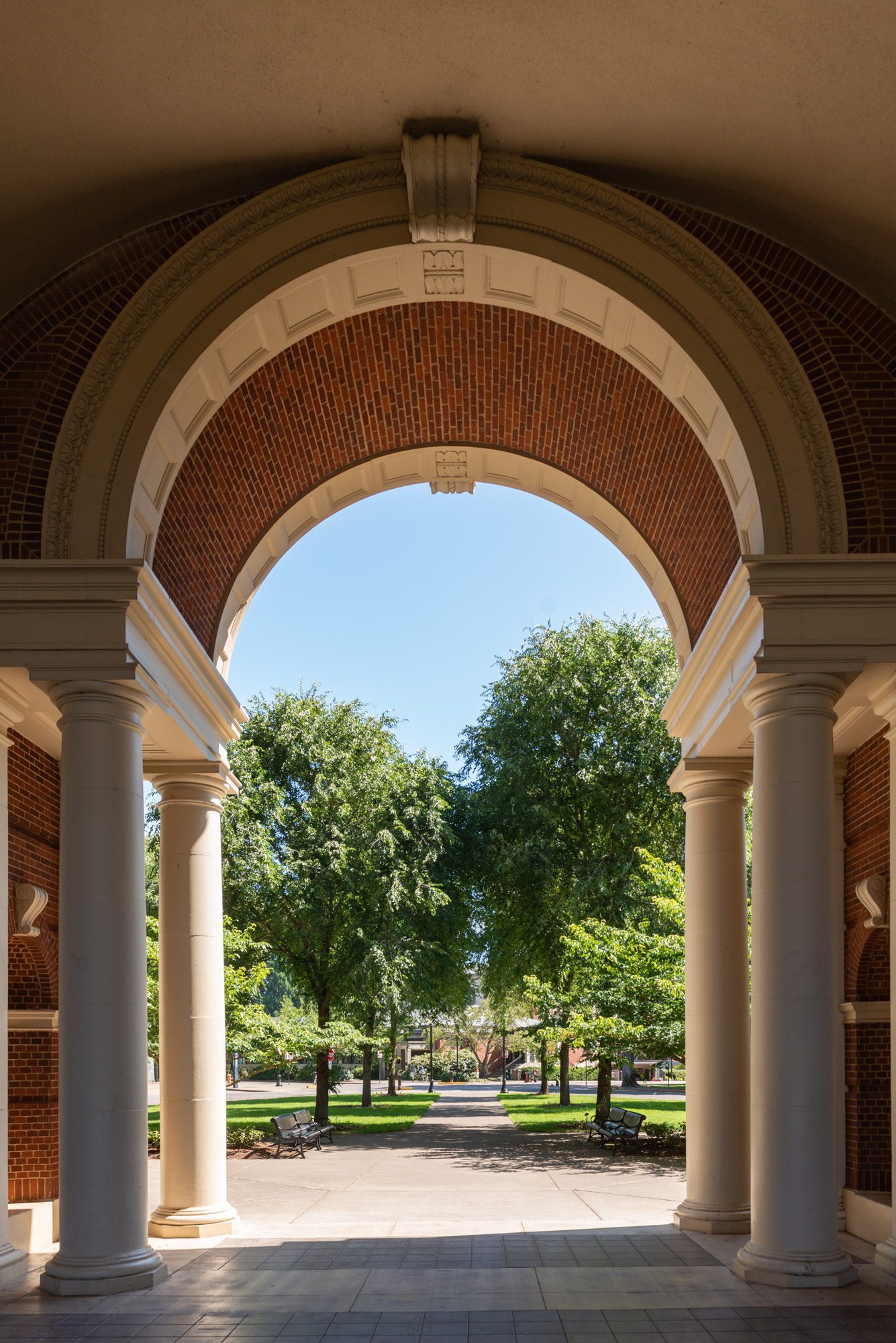
Six 'Homestead' before Weatherford Hall (2021)

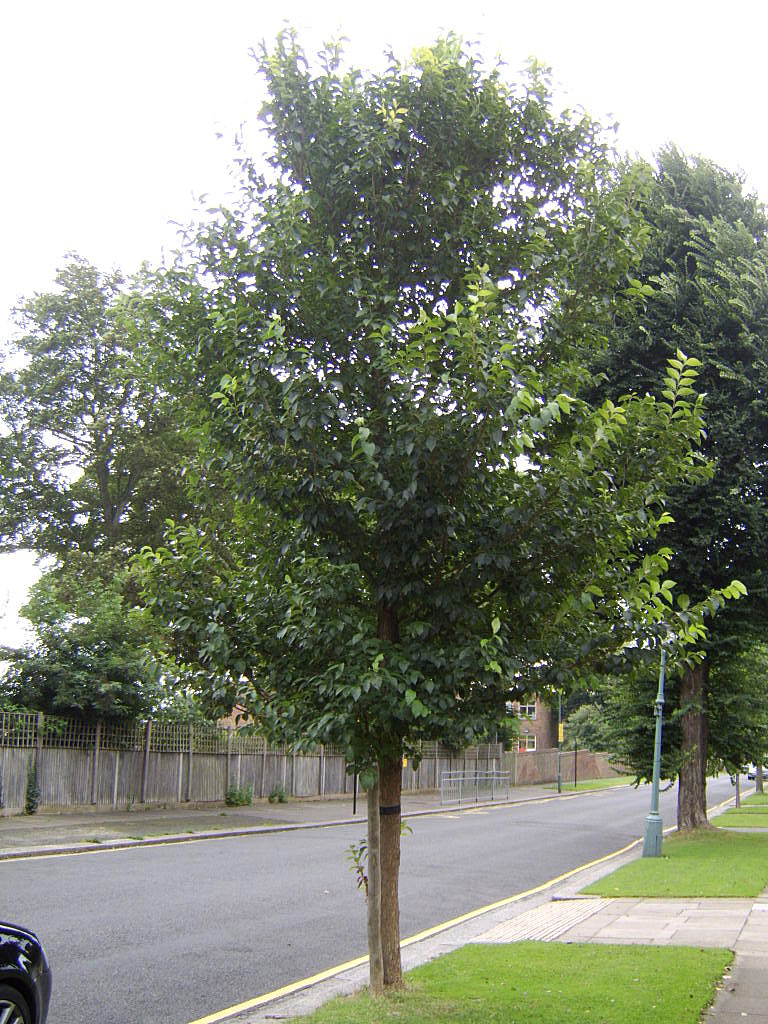
Young 'Homestead' in Radinden Manor Road, Hove (2008)

'Homestead' has had a limited introduction to Europe; experimental plantings were made along streets in Brighton, England, and in several Dutch cities, notably Beethovenstraat in Amsterdam, along the N360 at Ten Boer, and the Ijsselstraat at Hengelo. However, many of the Netherlands trees have since been replaced by the more DED-resistant 'Columella'. In 2016 'Homestead' was planted among the line of 140 elms on the ‘s-Gravelandsevaartweg, Loosdrecht, part of Wijdemeren City Council's elm collection, assembled since 2003 by tree manager Martin Tijdgat and his colleagues. Tijdgat noted that in older trees "the young, slender twigs hang gracefully", making 'Homestead' suitable for planting along ponds and water. The tree also featured in trials in New Zealand during the 1990s at the Hortresearch station, Palmerston North.

'Homestead' is very easily propagated from hardwood cuttings taken in February, placed in a 50:50 vermiculite / perlite medium and subjected to a bottom heat of @ 18°C.

== Notable trees ==
The largest specimens in the UK are to be found at Preston Park, Brighton, measuring 9 m high by 25 cm d.b.h. in 2009.

== Accessions ==
North America

- Bartlett Tree Experts, US. Acc. nos. 2001-100/1/2
- Brooklyn Botanic Garden, US. Acc. no. 20040605.
- Brenton Arboretum, US. 5 trees, acquired 2009. Acc. no. not known.
- Denver Botanic Gardens, US. no details available
- Dominion Arboretum, Canada. No acc. details.
- Holden Arboretum, US. Acc no. 90-57
- Louisville Arboretum, US. no details available
- Morton Arboretum, US. Acc. no. 964-2004
- New York Botanical Garden, US. Acc. nos. 1934/94, 954/97
- Smith College, US. Acc. no. 4403.
- University of Idaho Arboretum, US. Acc. no. 1990012
- U S National Arboretum , Washington, D.C., US. Acc. nos. 76487, 76251.

Europe

- Brighton & Hove City Council, UK. NCCPG Elm Collection.
- Grange Farm Arboretum, Sutton St James, UK.
- Great Fontley Elm Plantation, Funtley, Fareham, UK. One small sapling acquired winter 2022.

== Nurseries ==
North America

- Acorn Farms , Galena, Ohio, US.
- Bailey Nurseries , St. Paul, Minnesota, US.
- Carlton Plants, LLC, Dayton, Oregon, US.
- Charles J. Fiore , US.
- J. Frank Schmidt & Son Co., Boring, Oregon, US.
- Johnson's Nursery , Menomonee Falls, Wisconsin, US.
- Sun Valley Garden Centre, Eden Prairie, Minnesota, US.

Europe

- Batouwe Boomkwekerij B.V., , Dodewaard, Netherlands.
- Noordplant , Glimmen, Netherlands.
- Westerveld Boomkwekerij B.V., Opheusden, Netherlands.
