= Holmstrup, Denmark =

Holmstrup
- Town
- Location in the Region of Southern Denmark
- Coordinates: 55°21′41″N 10°16′19″E
- Country: Denmark
- Region: Southern Denmark
- Municipality: Odense Municipality

Population (2026)
  - Total: 229
- Time zone: UTC+1 (CET)
  - Summer (DST): UTC+2 (CEST)

Holmstrup is a village, with a population of 229 (1 January 2026), to the southwest of Odense, in Funen, Denmark.
