= Ulmus 'Patriot' =

Elm cultivar

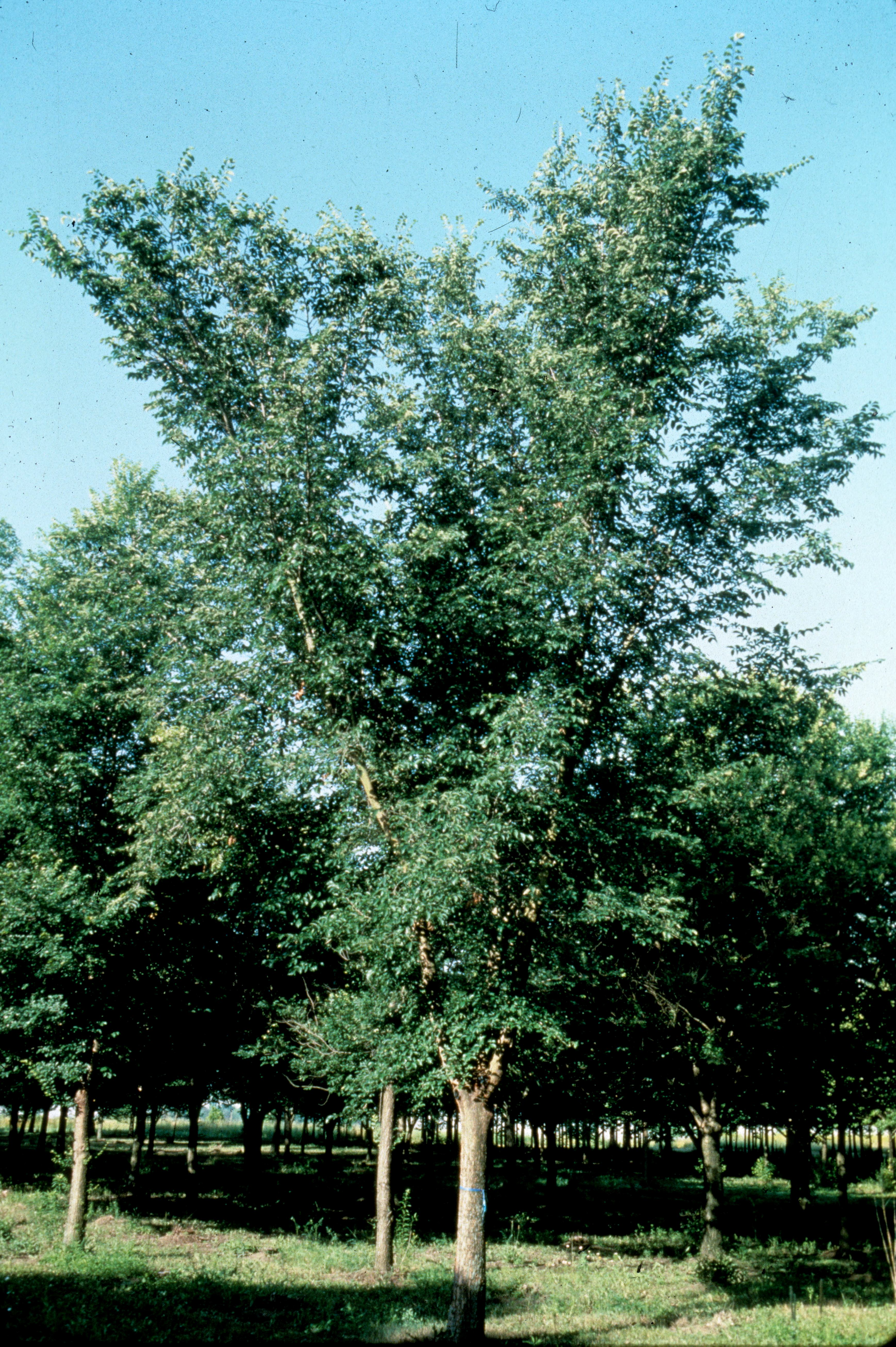
- Ulmus 'Patriot' at the USDA Plant Introduction Station, Glenn Dale, MD.
- Genus: Ulmus
- Hybrid parentage: 'Urban' × 'Prospector'
- Cultivar: 'Patriot'
- Origin: US

Ulmus 'Patriot' is a hybrid cultivar raised by the United States National Arboretum in 1980. Derived from a crossing of the American hybrid 'Urban' (female parent) with the Wilson's Elm (now treated as Japanese Elm U. davidiana var. japonica) cultivar 'Prospector', 'Patriot' was released to commerce, free of patent restrictions, in 1993. Tested in the US National Elm Trial coordinated by Colorado State University, 'Patriot' averaged a survival rate of 85% after 10 years.

== Description ==
The tree develops an upsweeping crown, ultimately adopting a narrow vase-shape. The leaves are slightly obovate, with doubly serrate margins and typically acuminate apices; they are of an average size for the genus, < 10 cm long by 7.5 cm broad, glossy dark green turning yellow in autumn. The perfect, apetalous wind-pollinated flowers appear in March. Flowering usually begins when the tree is aged six years.

Growth is vigorous; specimens in the USDA trials reaching a height of over 13 m (43 ft) and a spread of nearly 8 m (25 ft) after only 13 years. In an assessment at U C Davis as part of the National Elm Trial, 'Patriot' increased in height by almost 1.5 m and d.b.h. by 2.5 cm per annum.

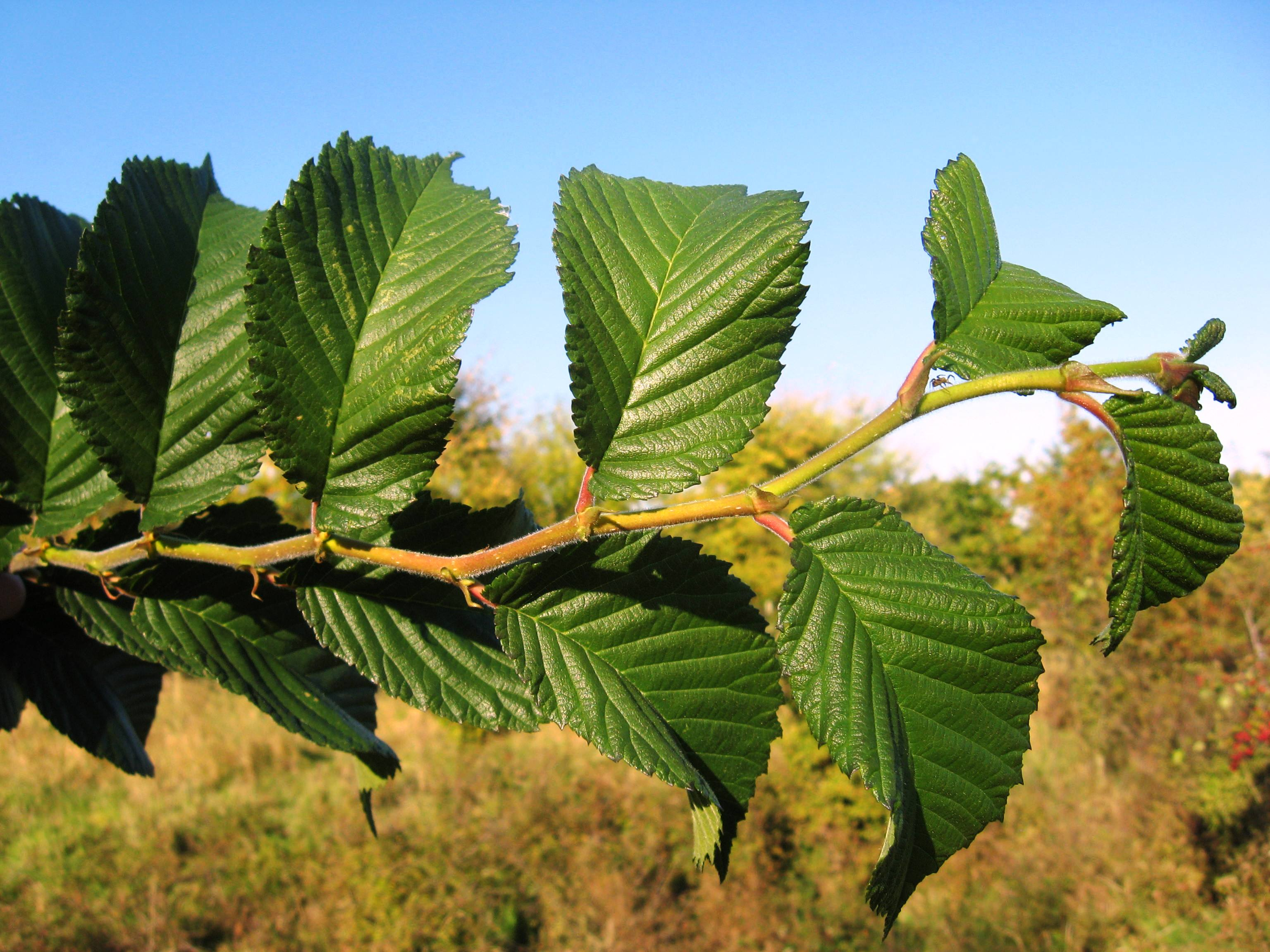
'Patriot' leaves

== Pests and diseases ==
'Patriot' was found to have a very high resistance to Dutch elm disease (DED) in the United States, exhibiting 100% survival seven years after inoculation with the causal pathogen. Tolerance of the elm leaf beetle Xanthogaleruca luteola is generally regarded as only moderate, although specimens grown at the aforementioned trials at U C Davis were among those cultivars least affected; resistance to Japanese beetle is poor. When grown for 11 years among hundreds of infected American elms in Delaware, Ohio, the clone showed no signs of susceptibility to elm yellows; however when tested by deliberate infection, tolerance was found to be poor.

== Cultivation ==
The tree performs best in moist but well-drained soils, but will tolerate alkaline ground and salts . In trials by Northern Arizona University in the hot and arid climate of Holbrook, eastern Arizona , it did not perform as well as 'Frontier' and 'Regal', but not as badly as others such as 'New Horizon' and 'Sapporo Autumn Gold'. In the cooler climes of Minnesota, it was recommended for every forester's 'Top Ten' list of urban trees. 'Patriot' is extremely cold hardy; in artificial freezing tests at the Morton Arboretum the LT50 (temp. at which 50% of tissues die) was found to be - 38 °C.

Propagation from softwood cuttings is reputedly easy; taken in mid-May, treated with a 3000 ppm IBA rooting hormone and placed under mist, < 95% should root in less than four weeks. However, commercial propagation is commonly by grafting onto a Siberian Elm Ulmus pumila rootstock. As height increase can rapidly outstrip stem width, lopping the stem above a leaf node at breast height and vertically training the new leader is recommended to create a more stable structure.

The tree is currently being evaluated in the National Elm Trial coordinated by Colorado State University. 'Patriot' was introduced to the Netherlands and the UK in 2008, and to Italy in 2011 by the Istituto per la Protezione delle Piante, Florence.

== Accessions ==
=== North America ===
- Arnold Arboretum, US. Acc. no. 136–98.
- Bartlett Tree Experts, US. Acc. nos. 2001–252/3/4, 2001–492/3, 2003–965, 2003–1007/8.
- Brenton Arboretum, US. 5 trees, acquired 2009. Acc. no. not known.
- Chicago Botanic Garden, US. 1 tree, in the Parking Lots.
- Dawes Arboretum, Newark, Ohio, US. 2 trees, accession numbers 2001-0874.001, 2001-0874.002.
- Holden Arboretum, US. Acc. nos. 00–125, 2001–154.
- Morton Arboretum, US. Acc. no. 122–2001.
- North Central Region Plant Introduction Station, ARS, Ames, Iowa, US. Acc. no. PI566597
- U S National Arboretum, Washington, D.C., US. Acc. nos. 72141, 66830.
- University of Idaho Arboretum, US. Two trees. Acc. no. 2000090.

=== Europe ===
- Grange Farm Arboretum, Lincolnshire, UK. Acc. no. 505.
- Istituto per la Protezione delle Piante, Florence, Italy. 2 small (<0.4 m) plants (2011).
- Royal Botanic Garden Edinburgh, UK. Acc. no. 20110001.

== Nurseries ==
=== North America ===
- J. Frank Schmidt & Son , Boring, Oregon, US.
- Johnson's Nursery , Menomonee Falls, Wisconsin, US.
- Pea Ridge Forest , Hermann, Missouri, US.
- Sun Valley Garden Centre, Eden Prairie, Minnesota, US.
