= Ulmus 'Urban' =

Elm cultivar

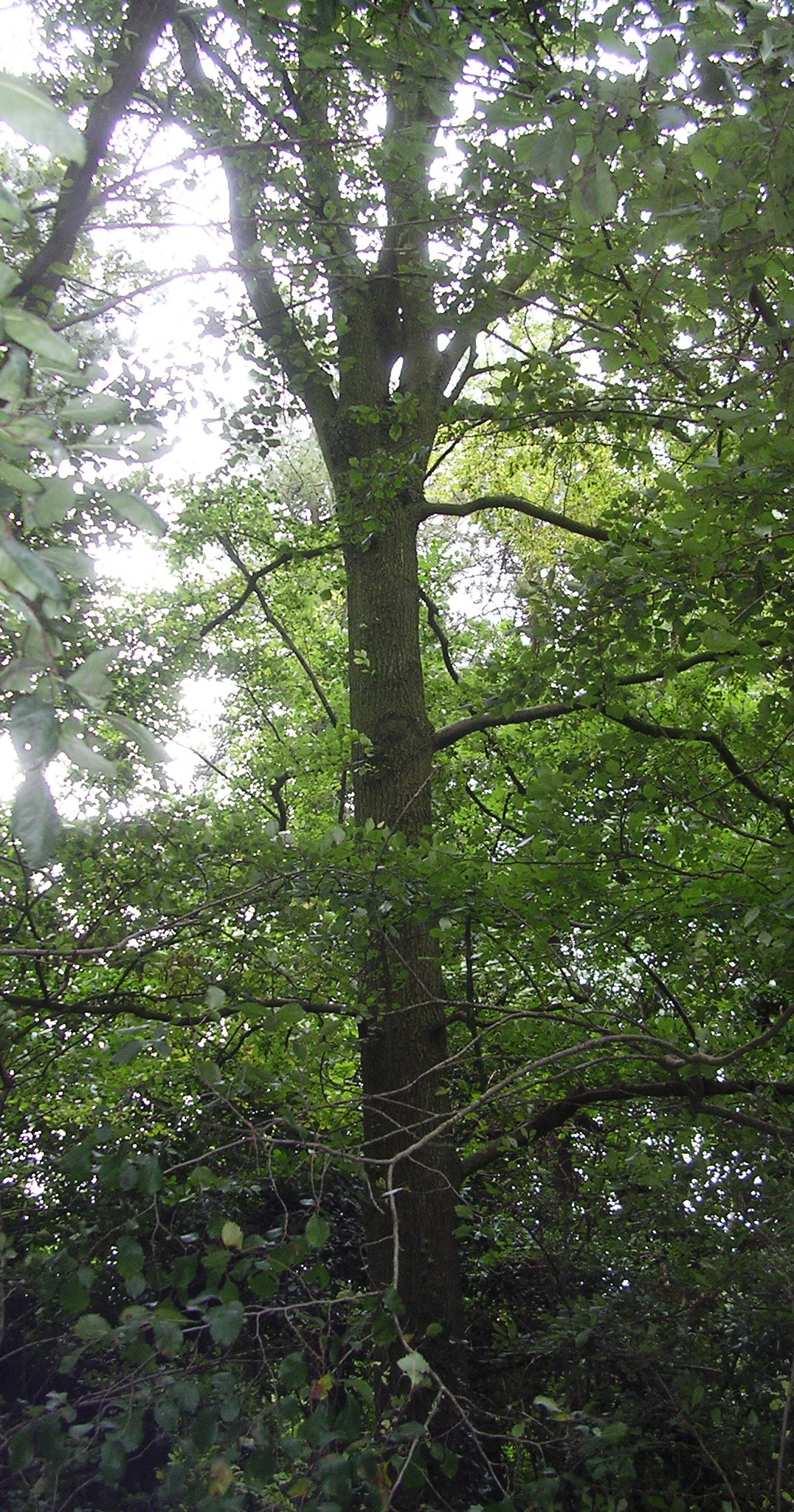
- 'Urban', Royal Bath & West showground, Shepton Mallet, UK
- Genus: Ulmus
- Hybrid parentage: U. pumila × '148' (U. pumila × U. minor '28')
- Cultivar: 'Urban'
- Origin: US

Ulmus 'Urban' is an American hybrid elm cultivar selected from the progeny of a controlled crossing of the Siberian elm, Ulmus pumila, (female parent) with the Dutch clone '148' (U. × hollandica 'Vegeta' × U. minor '28') in 1958 by Toru Arisumi of the USDA at Columbus, Ohio. Clone '148' had been sent to the US from the Netherlands in 1952 by Johanna Went, leader of the elm research team at the Willie Commelin Scholten Phytopathology Laboratory in Baarn.

== Description ==
'Urban' is considered a poor ornamental, the tree possessed of stiff branching and amorphous form. The lanceolate to obovate leaves are < 9 cm long × < 4 cm broad, smooth with light venation on the upper surface, on 6 mm petioles and clustered on short, very thin, wingless branchlets.

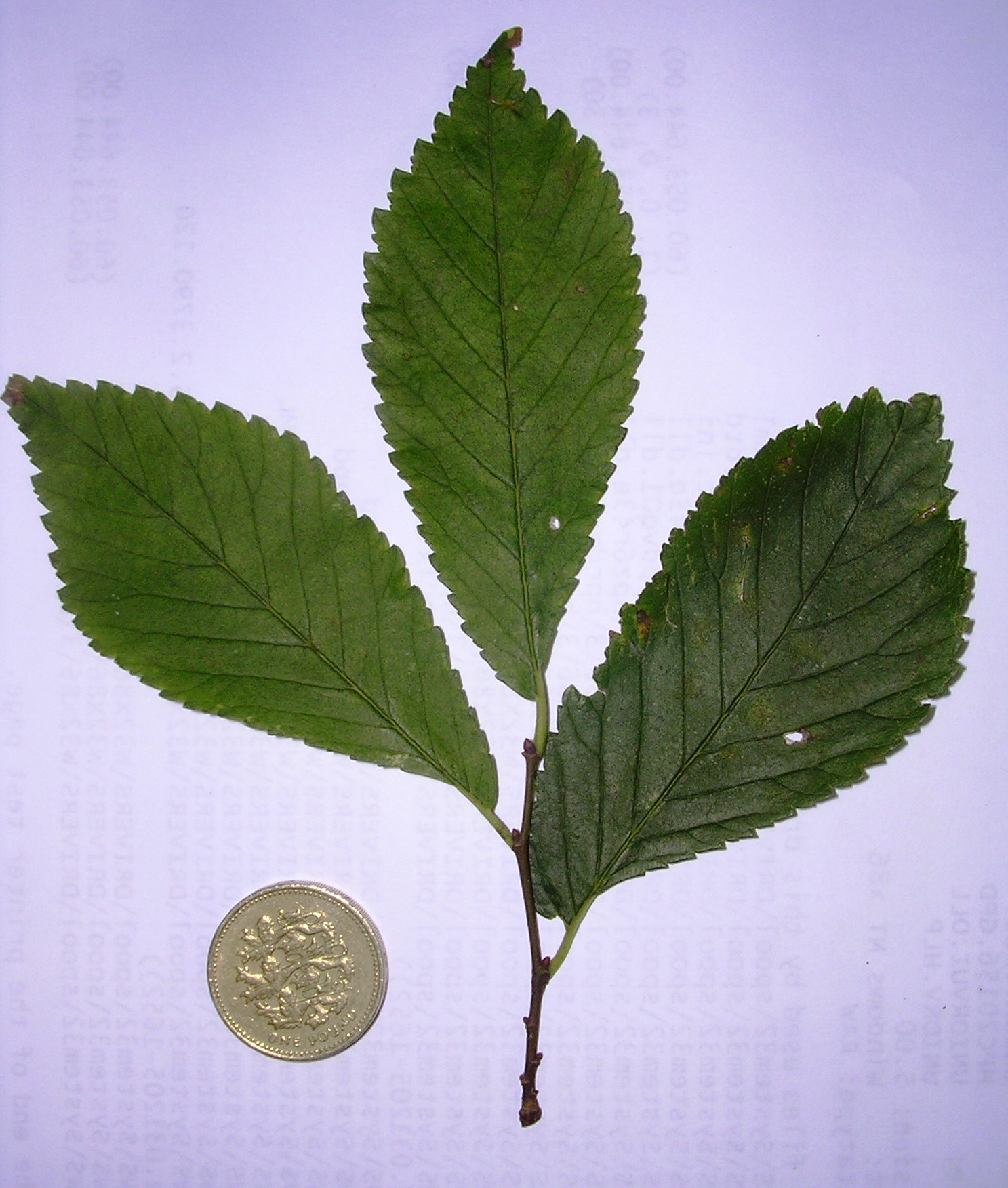
Leaves and £1 coin

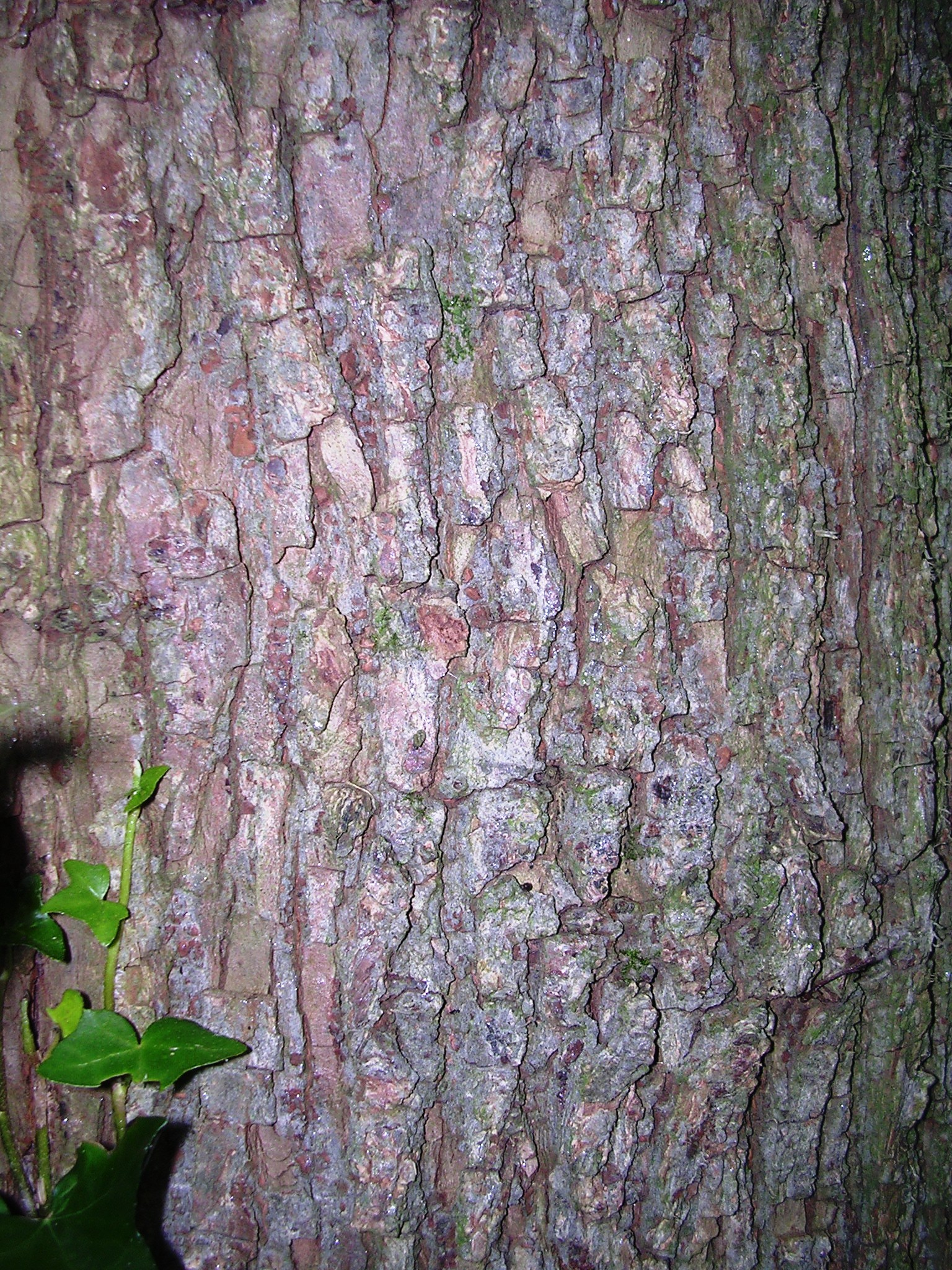
Bark of mature tree

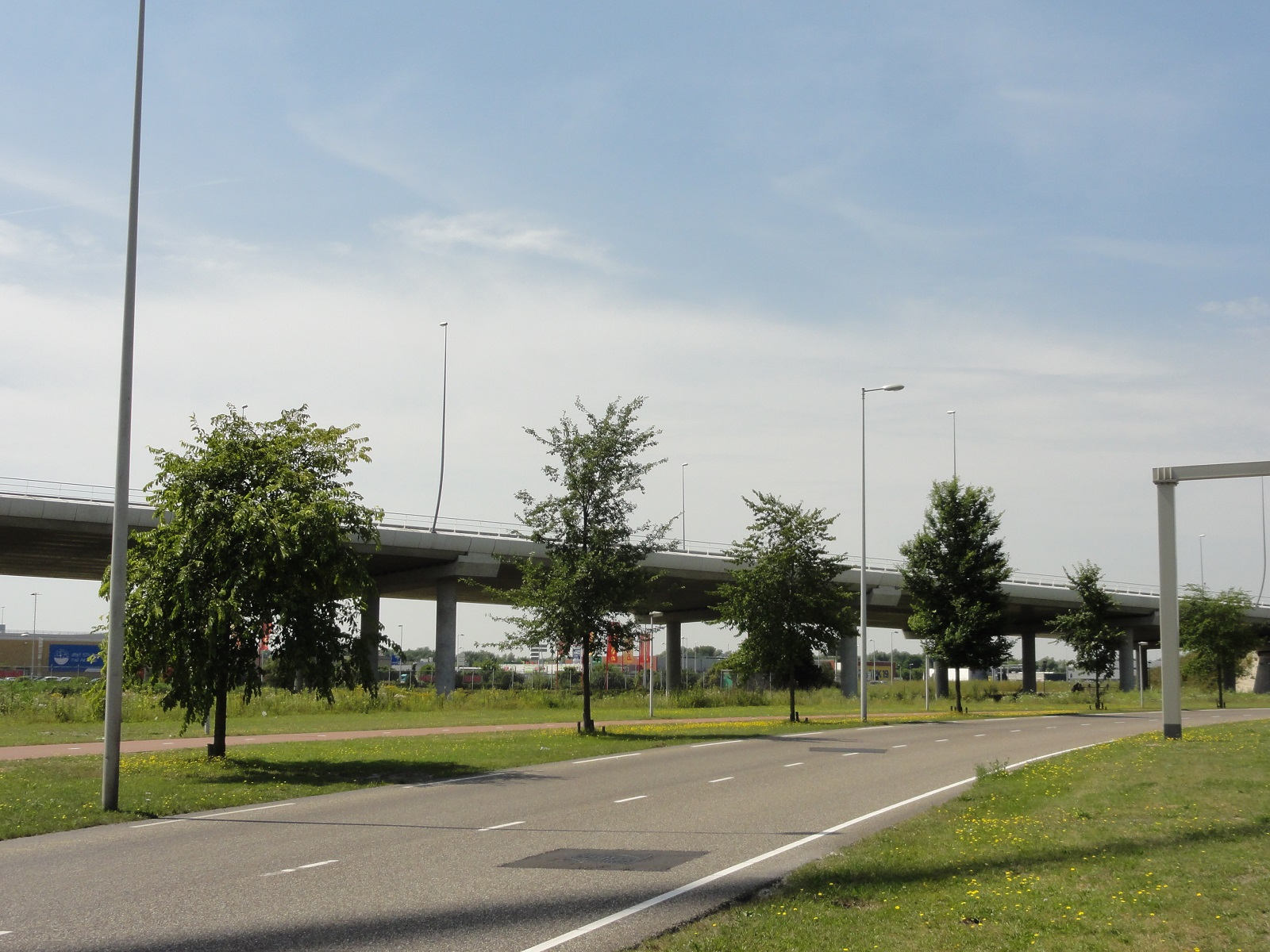
Elm cultivars, Nether-lands; 'Urban' 3rd from right

== Pests and diseases ==
'Urban' has a moderate resistance to Dutch elm disease; in trials conducted by the Istituto per la Protezione delle Piante, Florence, it suffered 49.5% defoliation and 36.5% dieback when inoculated with spores of the causal fungus, compared with 2.8% and 1.2% resp. for 'Sapporo Autumn Gold'. Foliage was adjudged "resistant" to black spot by the Plant Diagnostic Clinic of the University of Missouri. However, foliage can be heavily to severely damaged by the elm leaf beetle, Xanthogaleruca luteola.

== Cultivation ==
Noted for its tolerance of poor soils, pollution, and drought, 'Urban' was one of a number of elm hybrids assessed by the Forestry Commission in the UK in the 1970s; half a dozen trees were among a batch of elms donated by the Commission in 1981 to reinforce a shelter belt at the Royal Bath & West showground south of Shepton Mallet. All these trees initially grew strongly on the heavy clay loam, attaining > 8 m in height in seven years. However, at this age, one died of Dutch elm disease whilst four others exhibited weakness at the root and fell in gales in later years. Only one tree remains (the TROBI champion); 12 m high, 26 cm d.b.h. in 1997, and that in poor health in 2008. However, the trees are survived by numerous root suckers.

Other plantings in Europe are few and far between; several were established in the port area of Amsterdam, including Jan Vrijmanstraat and, notably, the Westpoortweg. The tree also featured in trials, in Canberra, Australia, started in 1988 but "has not shown promise in that environment".

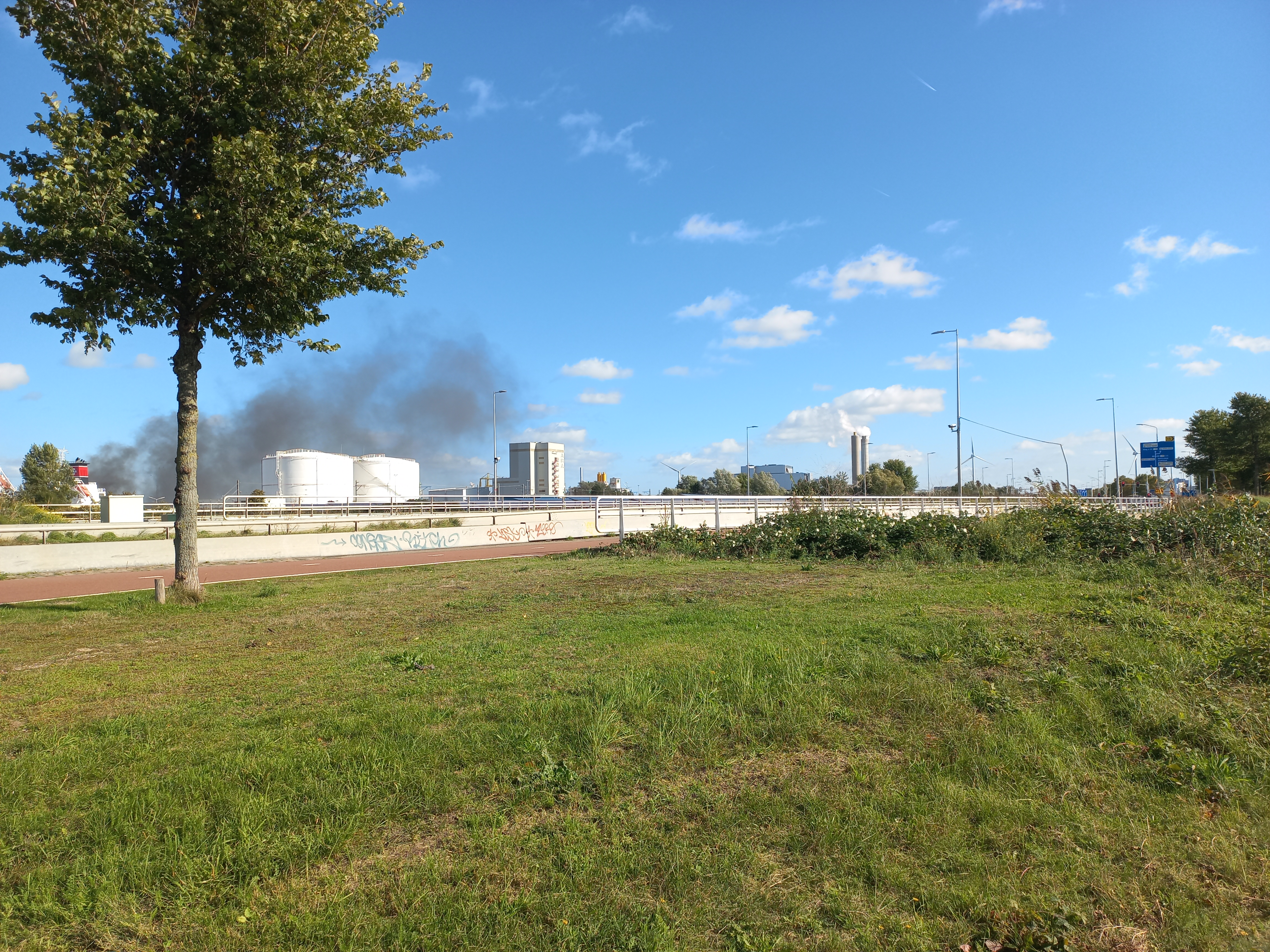
'Urban, Westpoortweg, Amsterdam (2022)

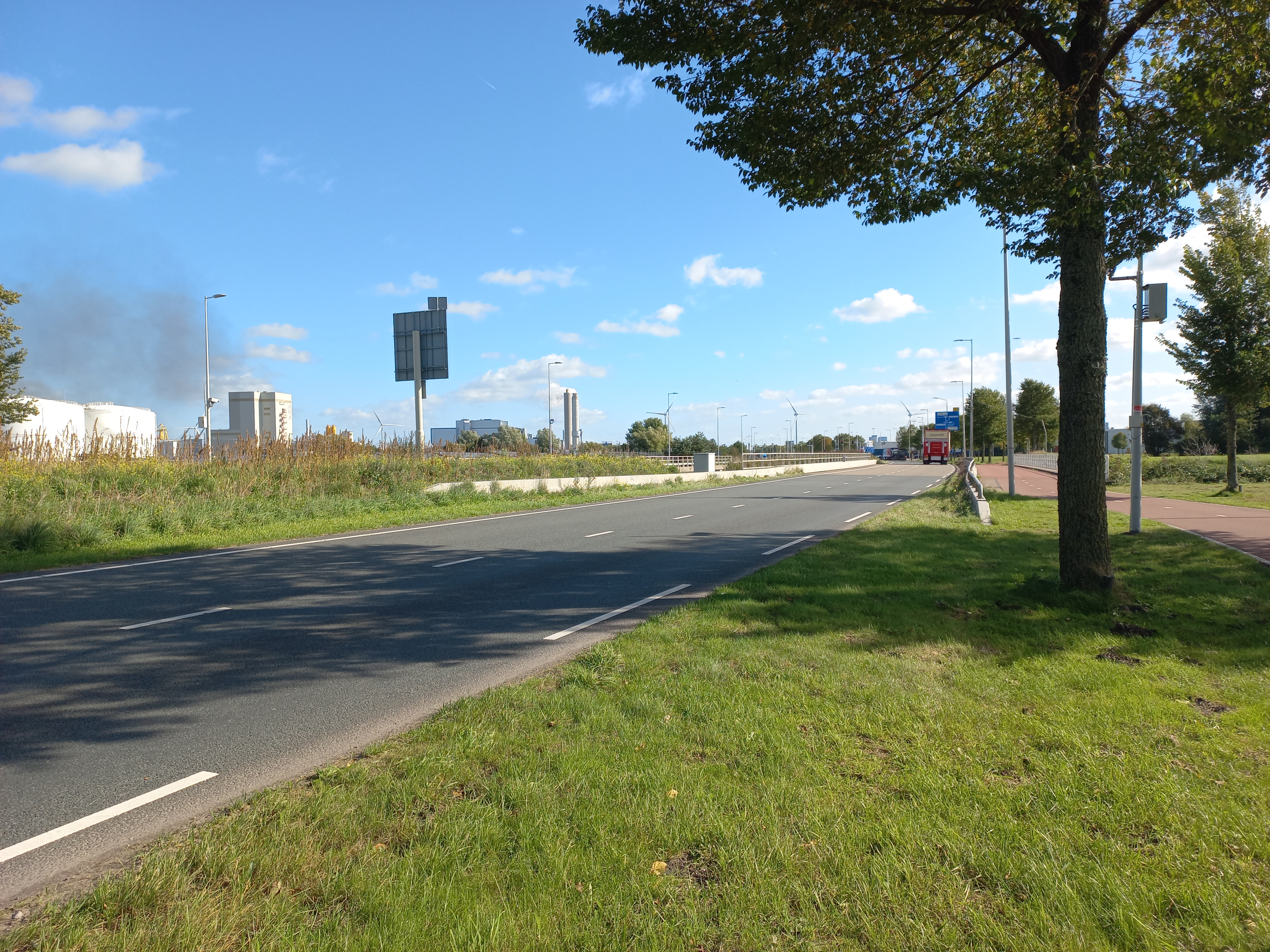
Same

== Hybrid cultivars ==
'Urban' was crossed with the Wilson's elm (now treated as Japanese elm, U. davidiana var. japonica) cultivar 'Prospector' to create the cultivar 'Patriot'.

== Synonymy ==
- 'Delaware No. 1': USDA, before commercial release as 'Urban'.
- 'Ohio Hybrid': Santamour, Frank S.; Bentz, Susan E. (May 1995). "Updated Checklist of Elm (Ulmus) Cultivars for use in North America". Journal of Arboriculture. 21 (3): 122–131.

== Accessions ==
North America

- Chicago Botanic Garden, US. 1 tree, in West Collections Area, listed as U. × hollandica 'Urban'.
- Dawes Arboretum, Newark, Ohio, US. 4 trees, accession numbers 1971-0191.001, 1982-0384.001, 1982-0384.003, 1983-0103.001.
- Morton Arboretum, US. Acc. no. 66–70

Europe

- Grange Farm Arboretum , Lincolnshire, UK. Acc. no. 824.
- Wijdemeren City Council, Netherlands. Elm collection, used in elm trials Ankeveen 2014.

== Nurseries ==
North America

- J. Frank Schmidt & Son Co., Boring, Oregon, US.
- Lake County Nursery , Perry, Ohio, US.
- Sun Valley Garden Centre, Eden Prairie, Minnesota, US.
