= Ulmus 'Rebona' =

Elm cultivar

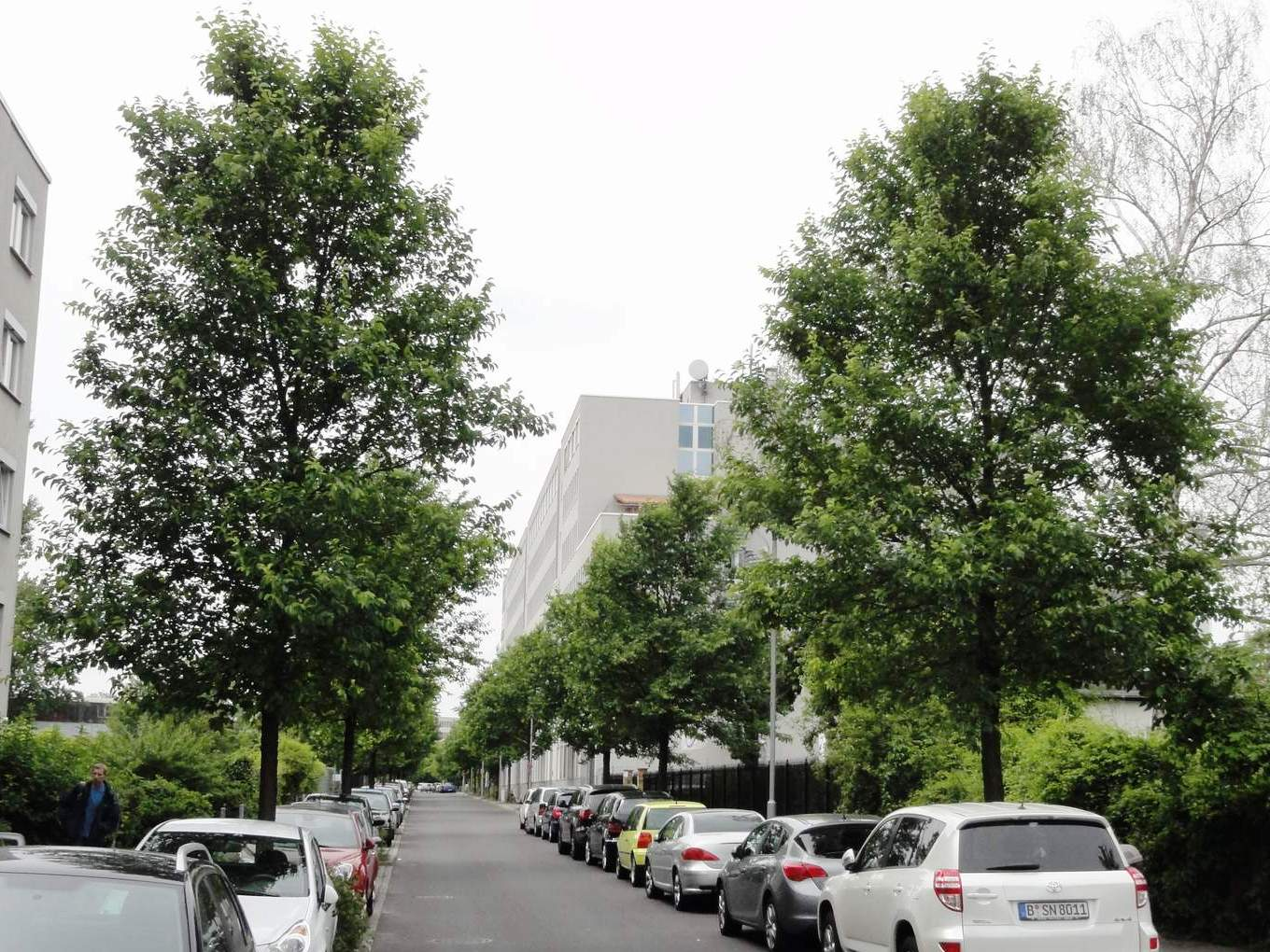
- 'Rebona', Treskowstrasse, Heinersdorf, Berlin (2014)
- Genus: Ulmus
- Hybrid parentage: U. davidiana var. japonica × U. pumila
- Cultivar: 'Rebona'
- Origin: US

Ulmus 'Rebona' is an American hybrid cultivar raised by the Wisconsin Alumni Research Foundation (WARF) as selection 'W916', derived from a crossing of Japanese Elm clone W43-8 = 'Reseda' with Siberian Elm clone W426 grown from seed collected from a street tree at Yankton, South Dakota. The tree was registered in 1993 by Conrad Appel KG, of Darmstadt (ceased trading 2006) and is a sibling of 'New Horizon' (selection 'W917'). In Europe, 'Rebona' is marketed as a Resista elm protected under E U breeders' rights (E U council decision 2100/94).

== Description ==
'Rebona' bears a close resemblance to its sibling 'New Horizon', but requires less maintenance owing to a better leader. The tree grows rapidly, developing a fastigiate pyramidal shape with ascending branches. The glossy leaves (6 to 9 cm long by 3 to 5 wide) are described by Resista Ulmen as "a little smaller and darker" than those of 'New Horizon'. The petiole is 10 to 15 mm long. The seed is central in the samara.

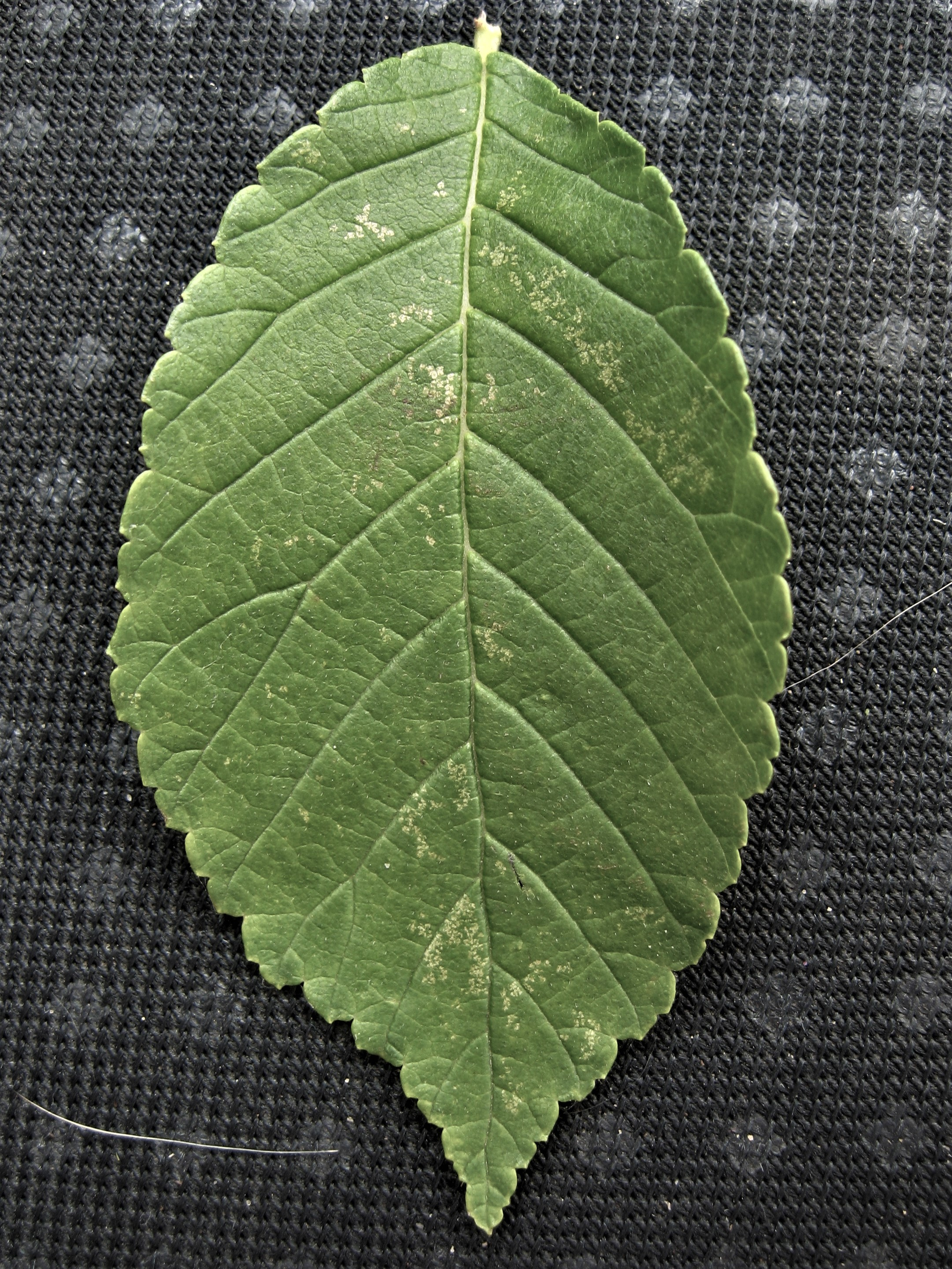
'Rebona' leaf

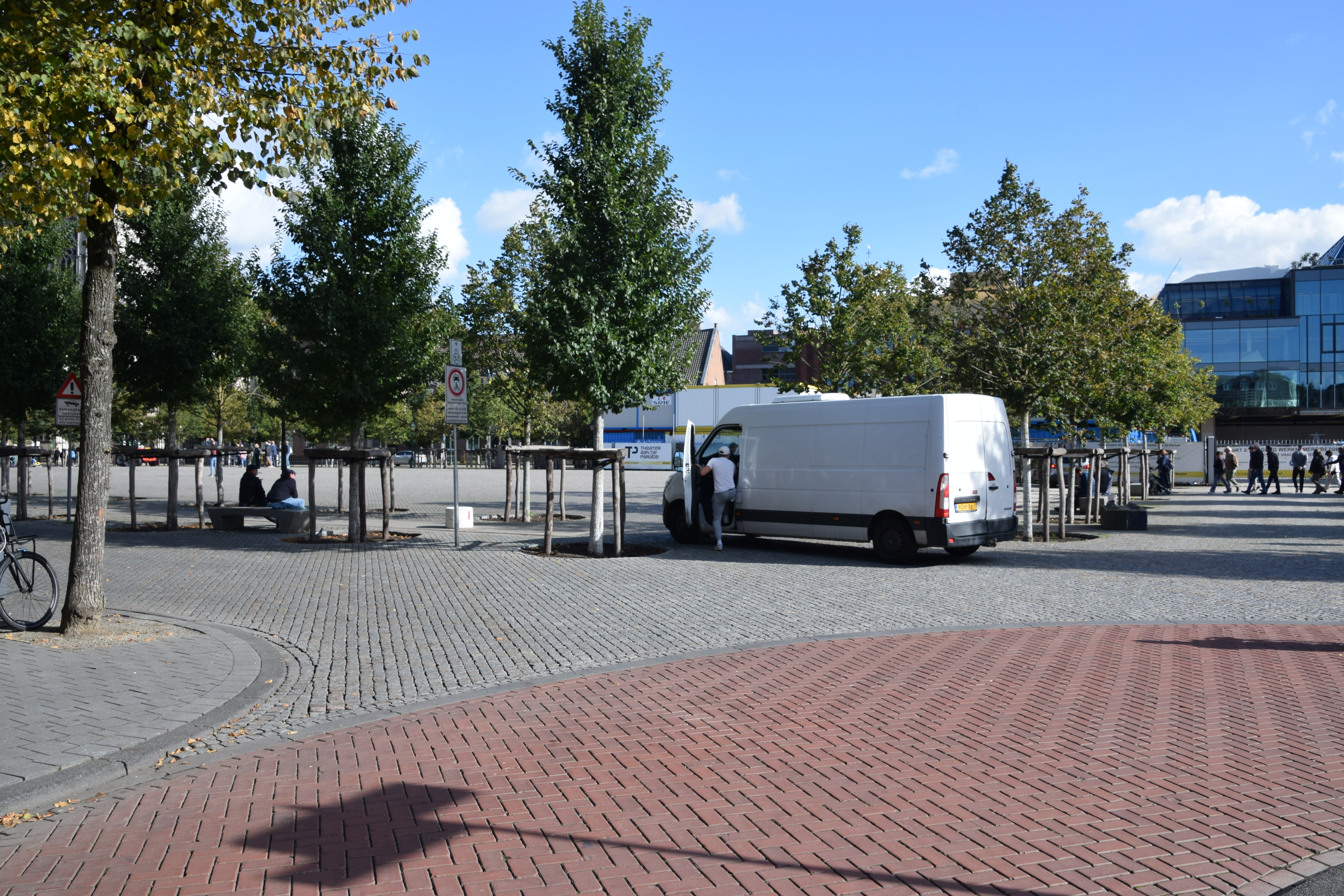
Young 'Rebona' (centre)

== Pests and diseases ==
'Rebona' is highly resistant to Dutch elm disease, rated 5 out of 5.

== Cultivation ==
'Rebona' has been widely planted as a street tree in Germany, the Netherlands, and to a lesser extent France and the UK. In the Netherlands lines of 'Rebona' were planted in the Parade in the centre of Den Bosch, North Brabant, in 2022. Three stand near the entrance to Fenchurch Street Station, London. The tree has never been offered for sale in the United States.

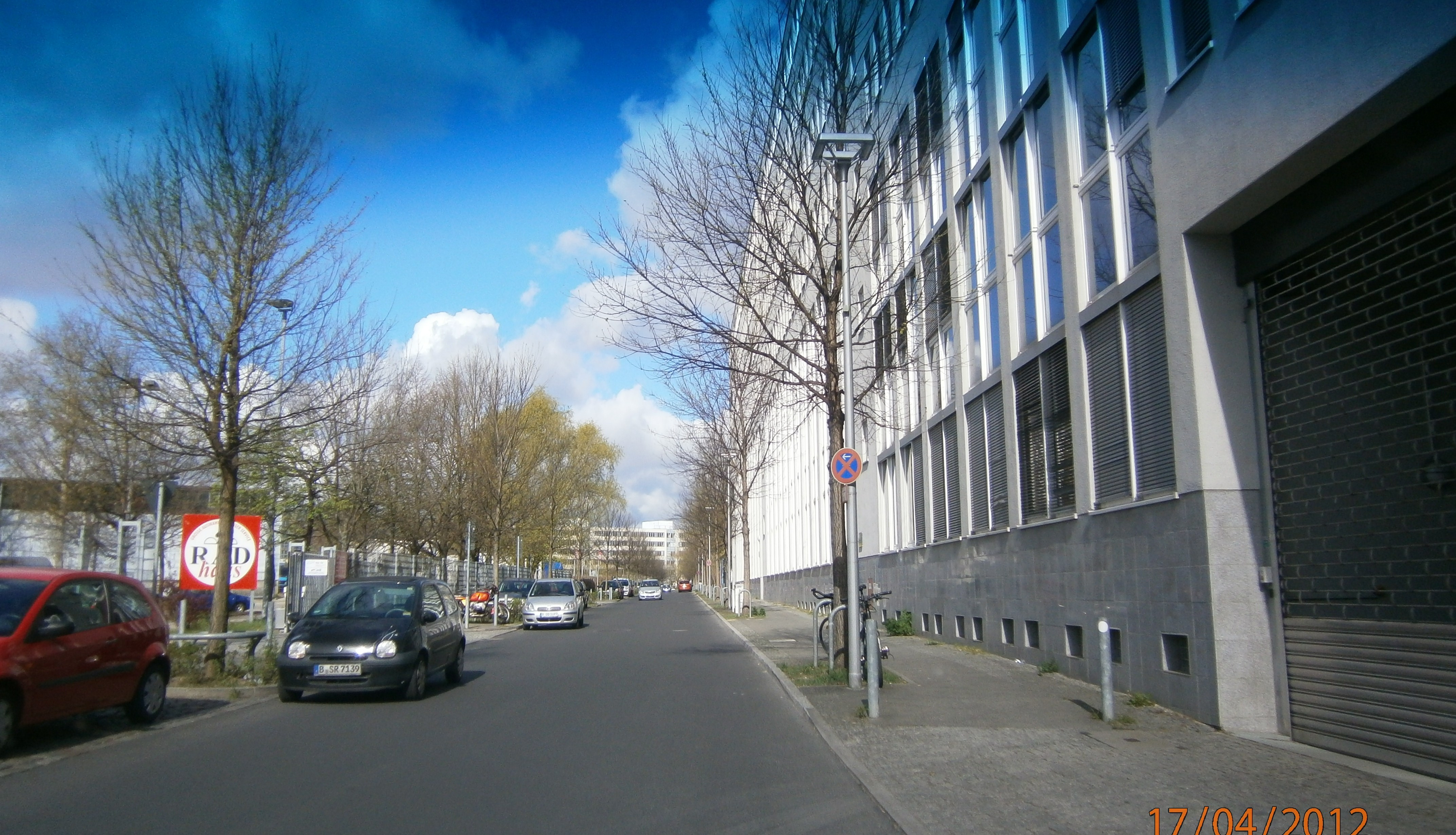
'Rebona' in spring, Treskowstrasse, Berlin-Heinersdorf (2012)

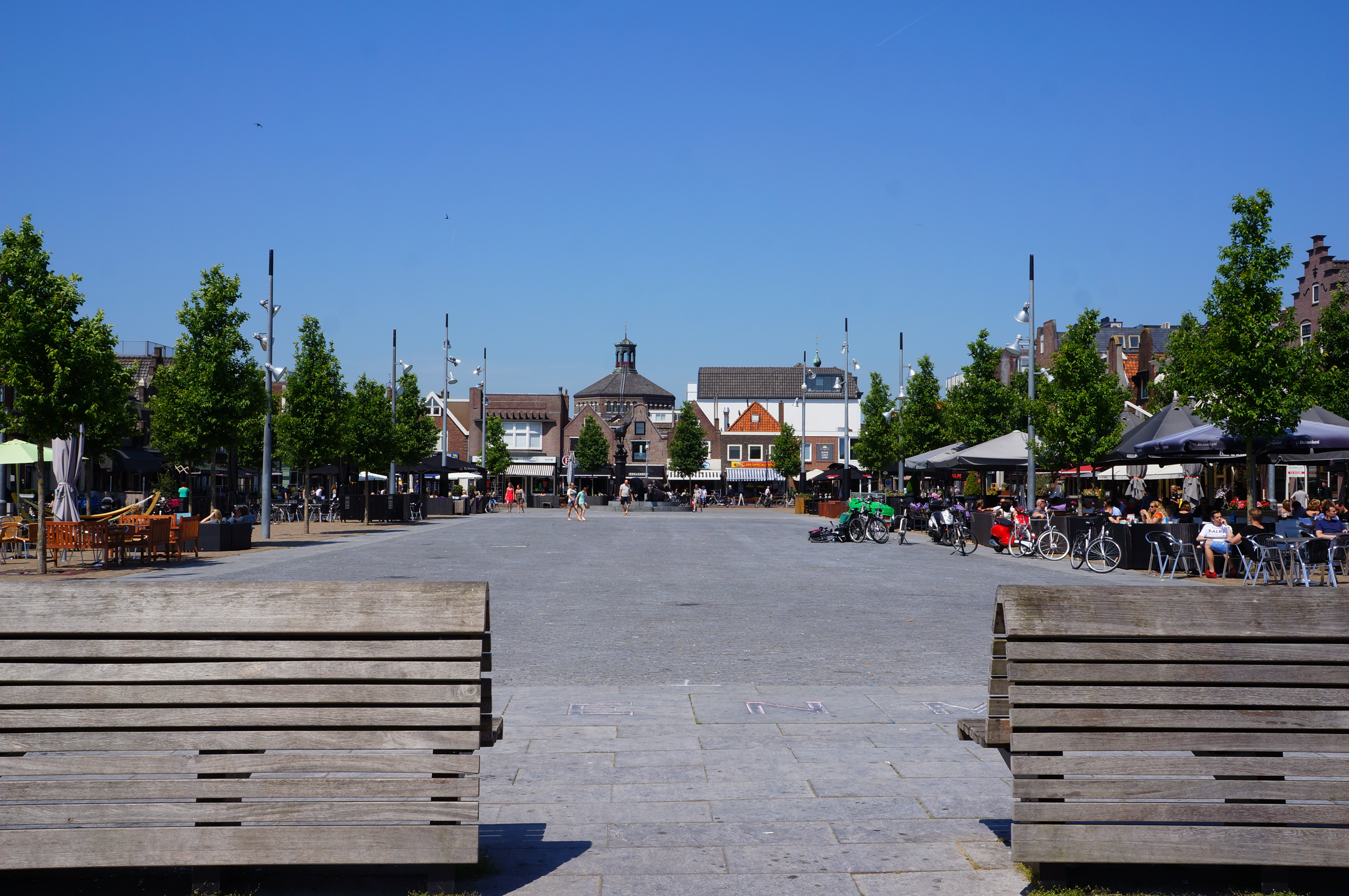
Lines of 'Rebona' in Purmerend city centre, the Netherlands (2015)

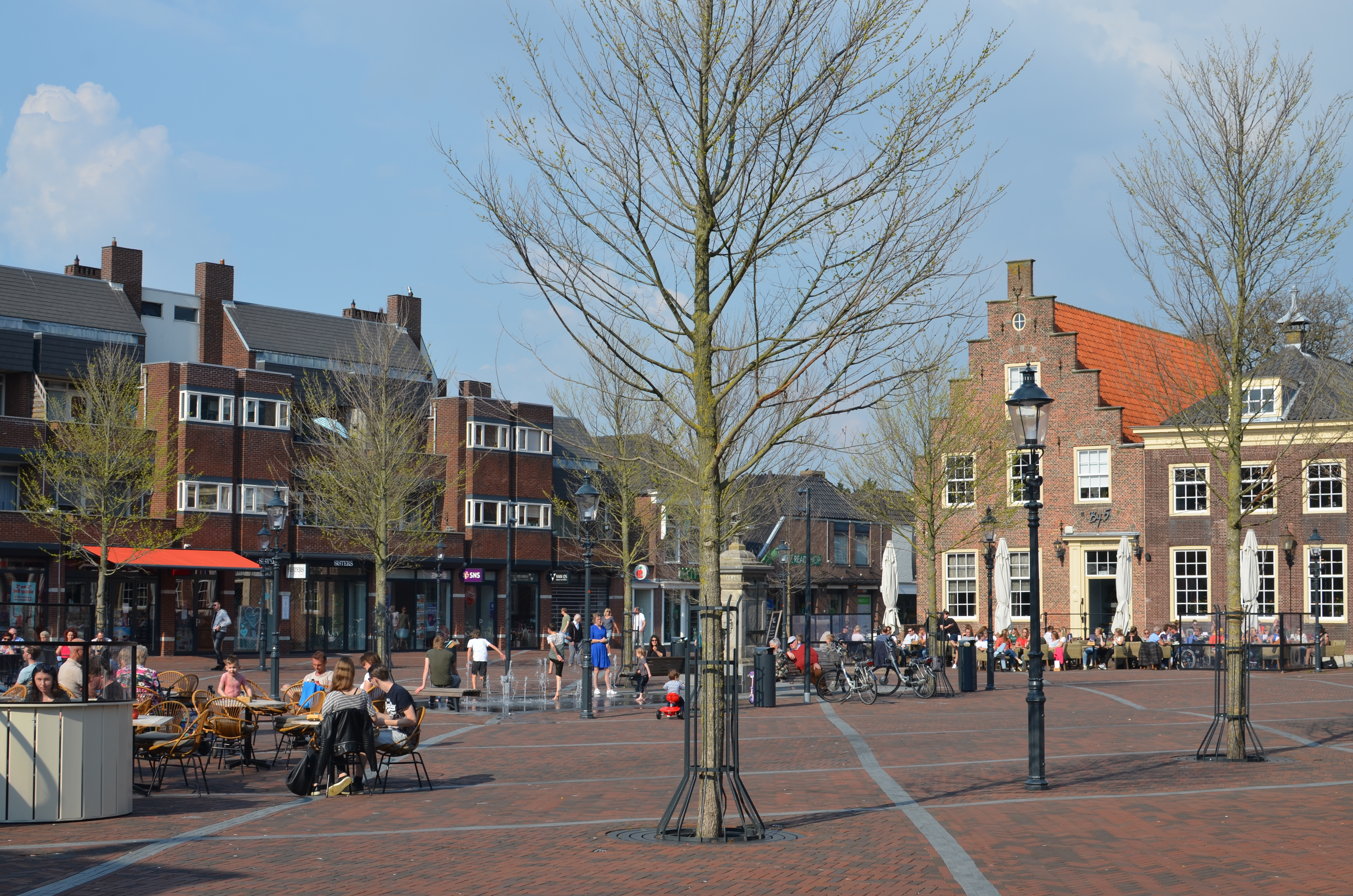
'New Horizon' and 'Rebona' alternating in the Wilhelminaplein, Naaldwijk (2019)

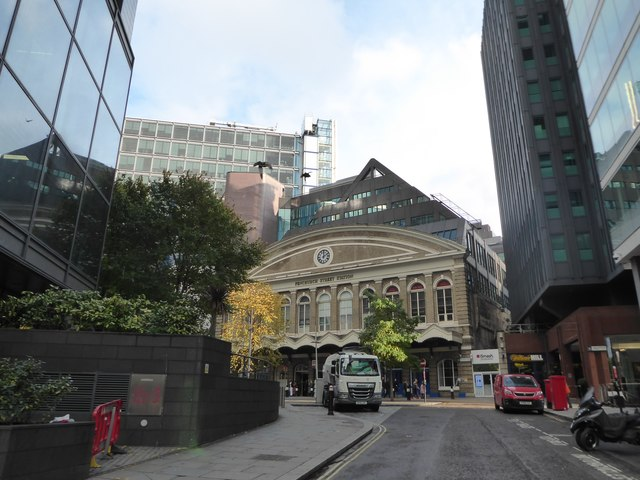
'Rebona' (left), Fenchurch Street Station, London (2019)

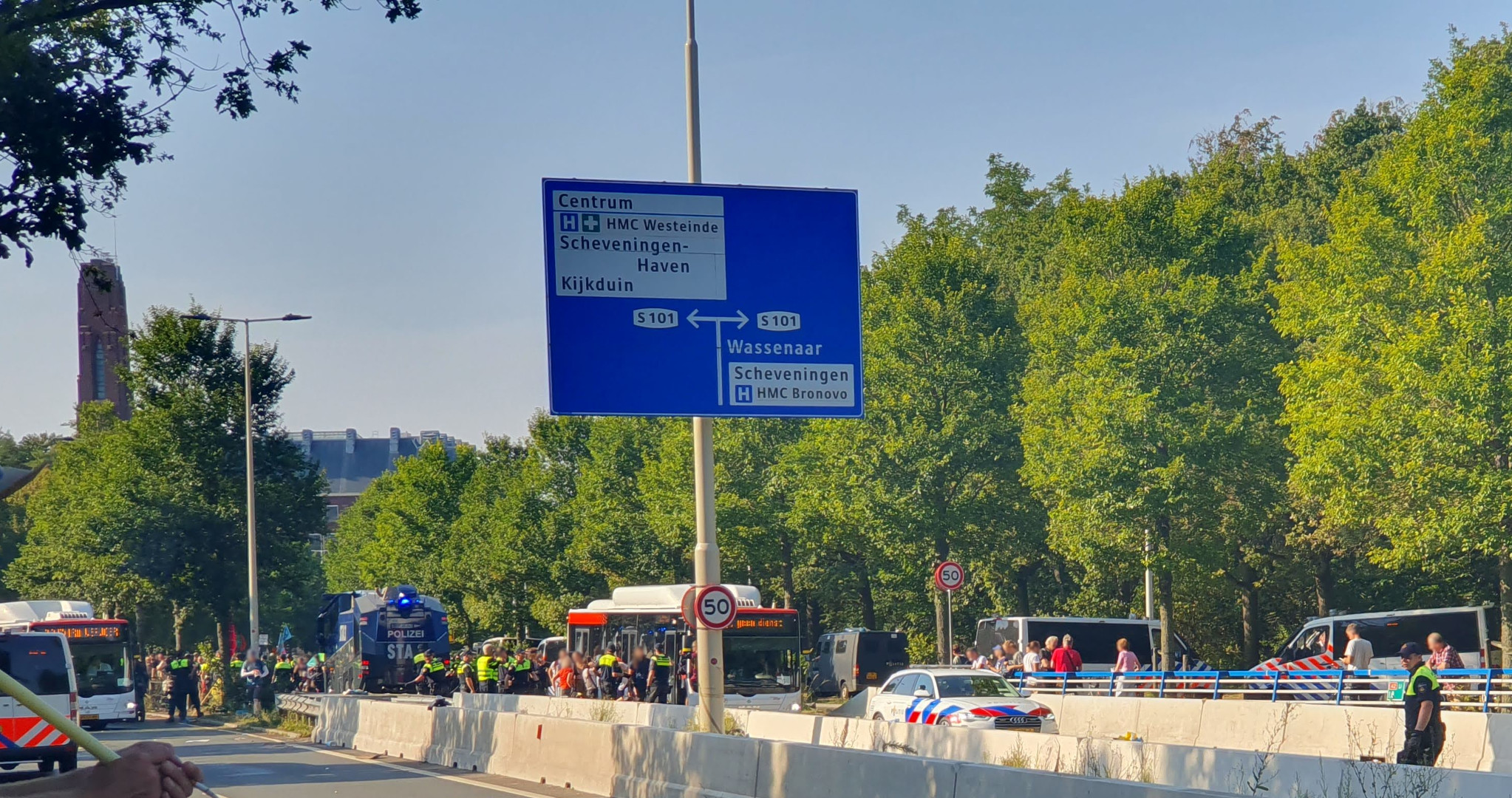
'Rebona' lining Utrechtsebaan, The Hague (September 2023)

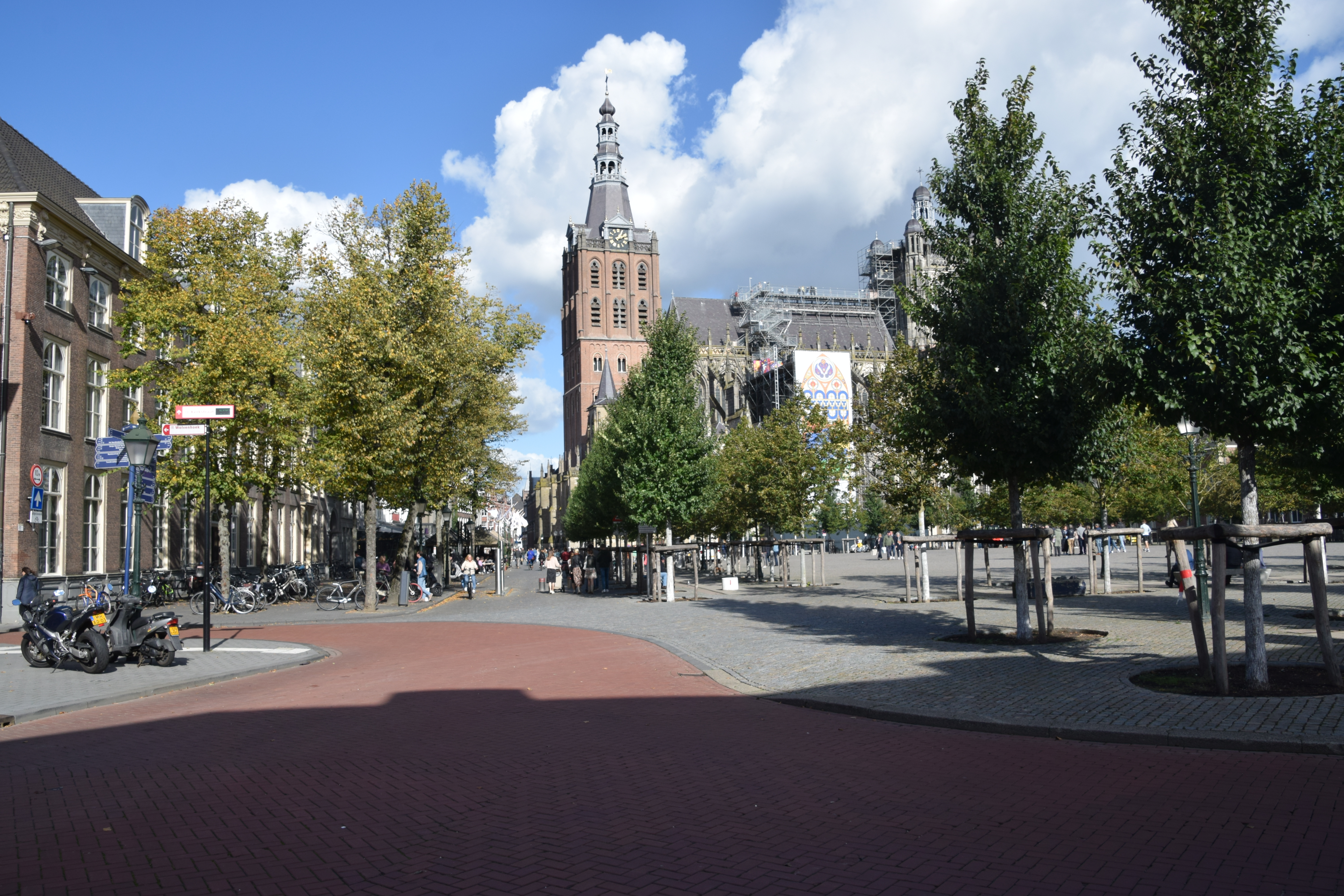
'Rebona' (centre and right), De Parade, Den Bosch, North Brabant, Netherlands (October 2023)

== Synonymy ==
- 'Rebone'

== Accessions ==
=== Europe ===
- Botanischer Garten Marburg, Marburg, Germany. No details available.
- Grange Farm Arboretum, Lincolnshire, UK. Acc. no. not known.
- Höxter Botanical Garden, Ostwestfalen-Lippe University of Applied Sciences, Höxter, Germany. Planted 2023
- Royal Botanic Gardens, Kew, UK. Acc. no. not known.
- Sir Harold Hillier Gardens, Romsey, UK. One tree planted Crookhill overflow parking area. Acc. no. 2018.0019

== Nurseries ==
=== Europe ===
- Baumschule Grossbötzl Ort, Austria.
- Björkhaga Plantskola Veberöd, Sweden.
- Clasen & Co Rellingen, Germany.
- Eisele GmbH, Darmstadt, Germany.
- Hillier Nurseries, Ampfield, UK.
- Boomkwekerij Ebben, Cuijk, Netherlands.
- Pépinières Rouy-Imbert Monfavet-Avignon, France.
