= Ulmus 'New Horizon' =

Elm cultivar

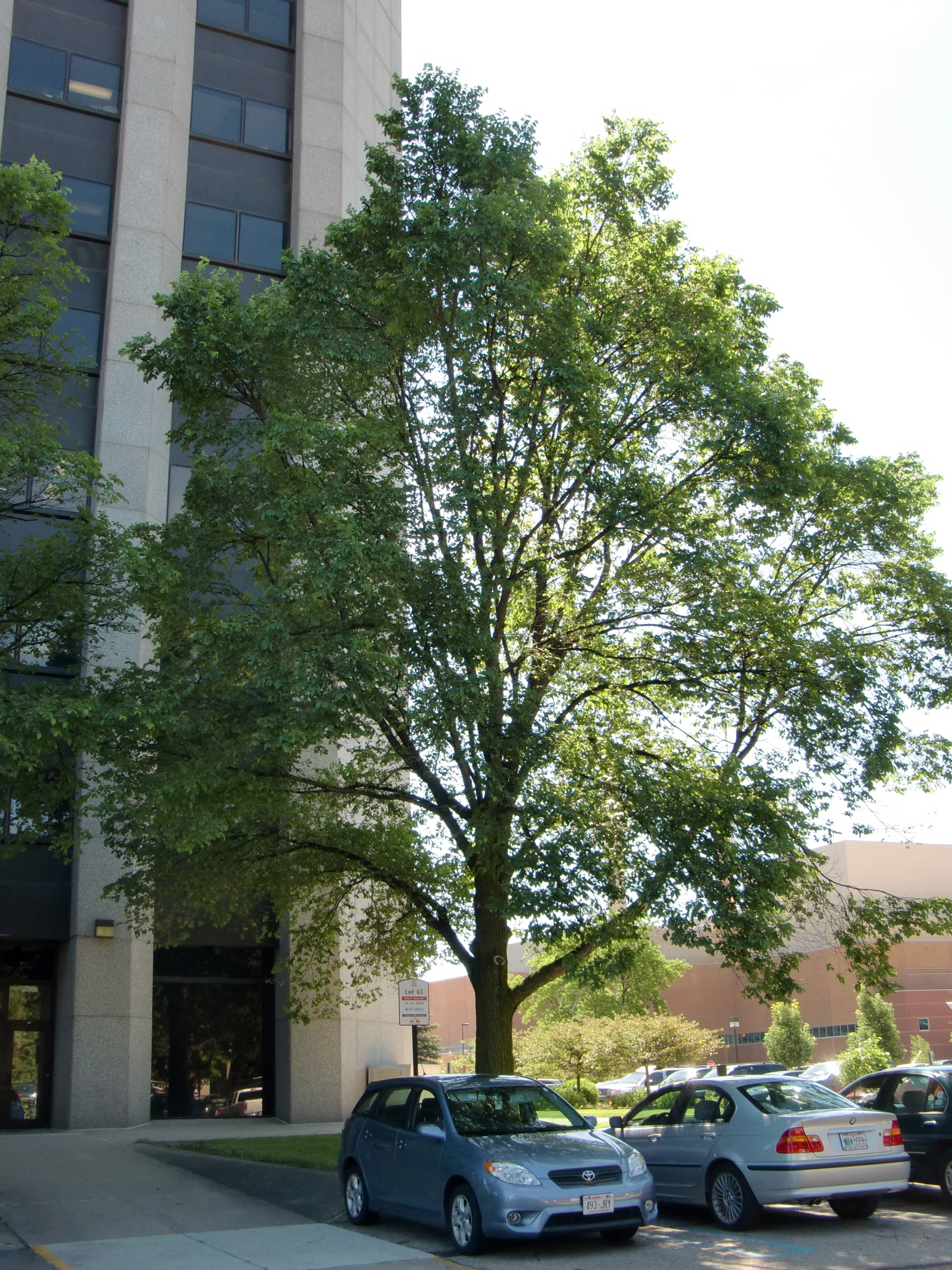
- 'New Horizon', Wisconsin-Madison University
- Genus: Ulmus
- Hybrid parentage: U. davidiana var. japonica × Ulmus pumila
- Cultivar: 'New Horizon'
- Origin: WARF, Wisconsin, USA

Ulmus 'New Horizon' is an American hybrid cultivar raised by the Wisconsin Alumni Research Foundation (WARF), from a crossing of the Japanese Elm clone W43-8 = 'Reseda' (female parent) with Siberian Elm clone W426 grown from seed collected from a street tree at Yankton, South Dakota. As selection 'W917' it is a sibling of 'Rebona' (selection 'W916'). Tested in the US National Elm Trial coordinated by Colorado State University, 'New Horizon' averaged a survival rate of 74% after 10 years. 'New Horizon' was patented in the US in 1994, while in Europe, it is marketed as one of the 'Resista' elms protected under EU breeders' rights (EU council decision 2100/94).

== Description ==
Unlike its elder stablemate 'Sapporo Autumn Gold', 'New Horizon' initially has a compact, pyramidal form, with comparatively dense foliage comprising glabrous, dark-green, elliptical leaves < 12 cm long by 7 cm broad, occasionally without the asymmetric bases typical of the genus. The perfect, apetalous wind-pollinated flowers appear in March, followed by the seeds in April; flowering, and consequent fruiting, is sparse, in common with its female parent Japanese Elm, and usually begins when the tree is aged 8 years.

The tree's growth habit is unusual; in an assessment at U C Davis as part of the National Elm Trial, its stem diameter increased faster than any other of the 15 cultivars, but increase in height, averaging 0.9 m per annum, made it one of the slowest growing, vertically.

In commerce in the US, the tree is occasionally propagated by grafting onto an Ulmus pumila rootstock, rather than simply rooting cuttings as normally practiced in North America and Europe.

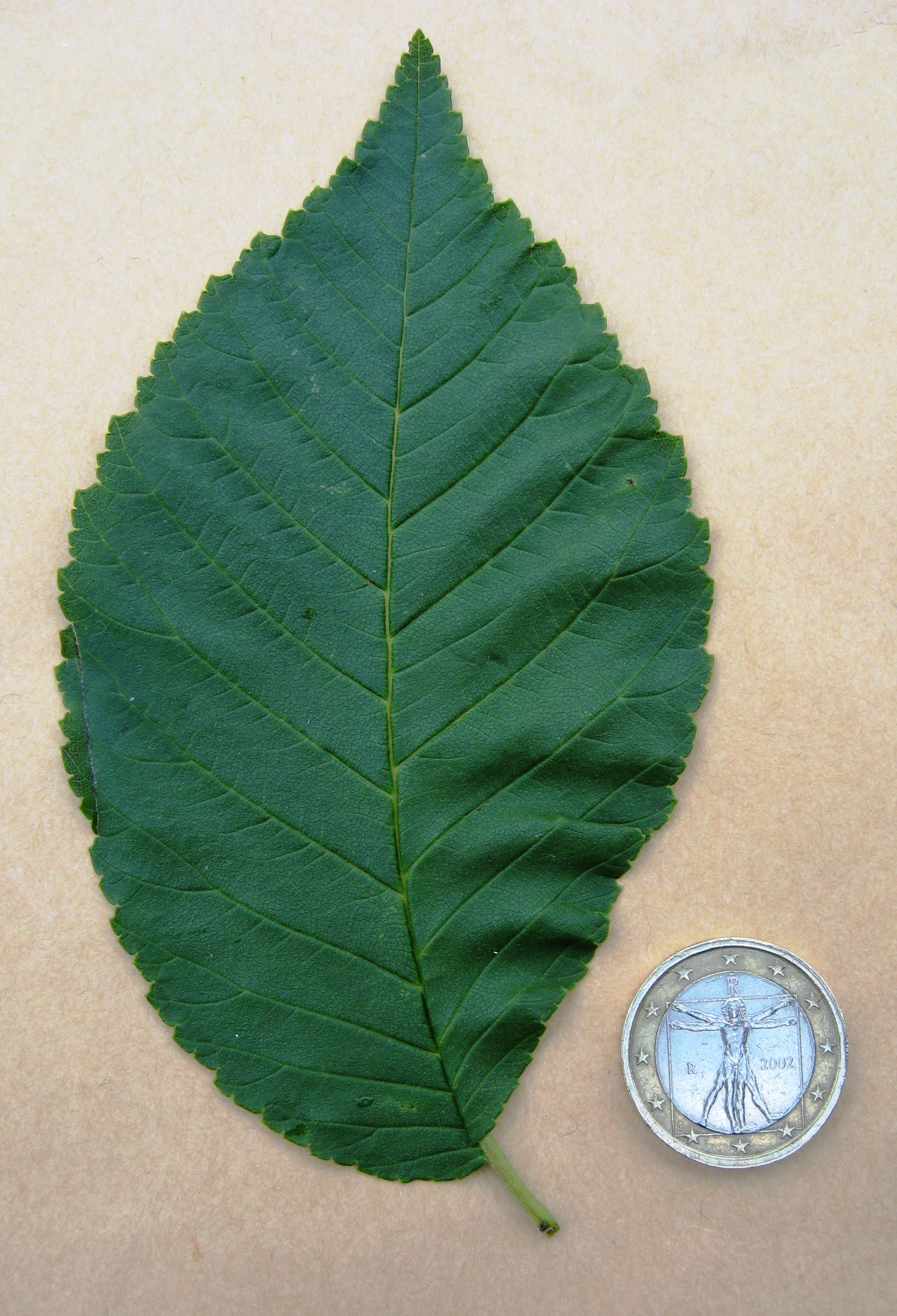
Leaf, with 1 Euro coin

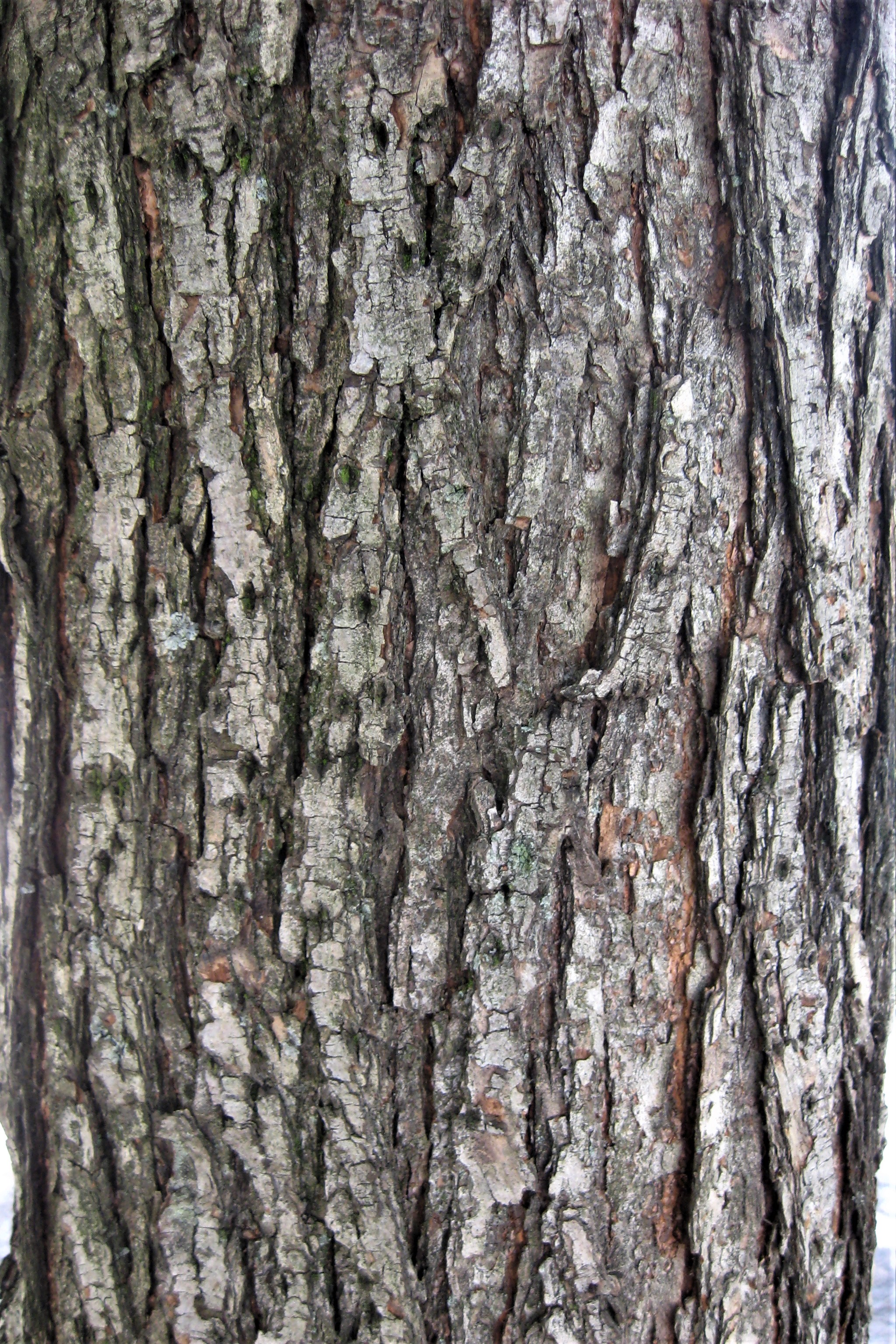
'New Horizon' bark

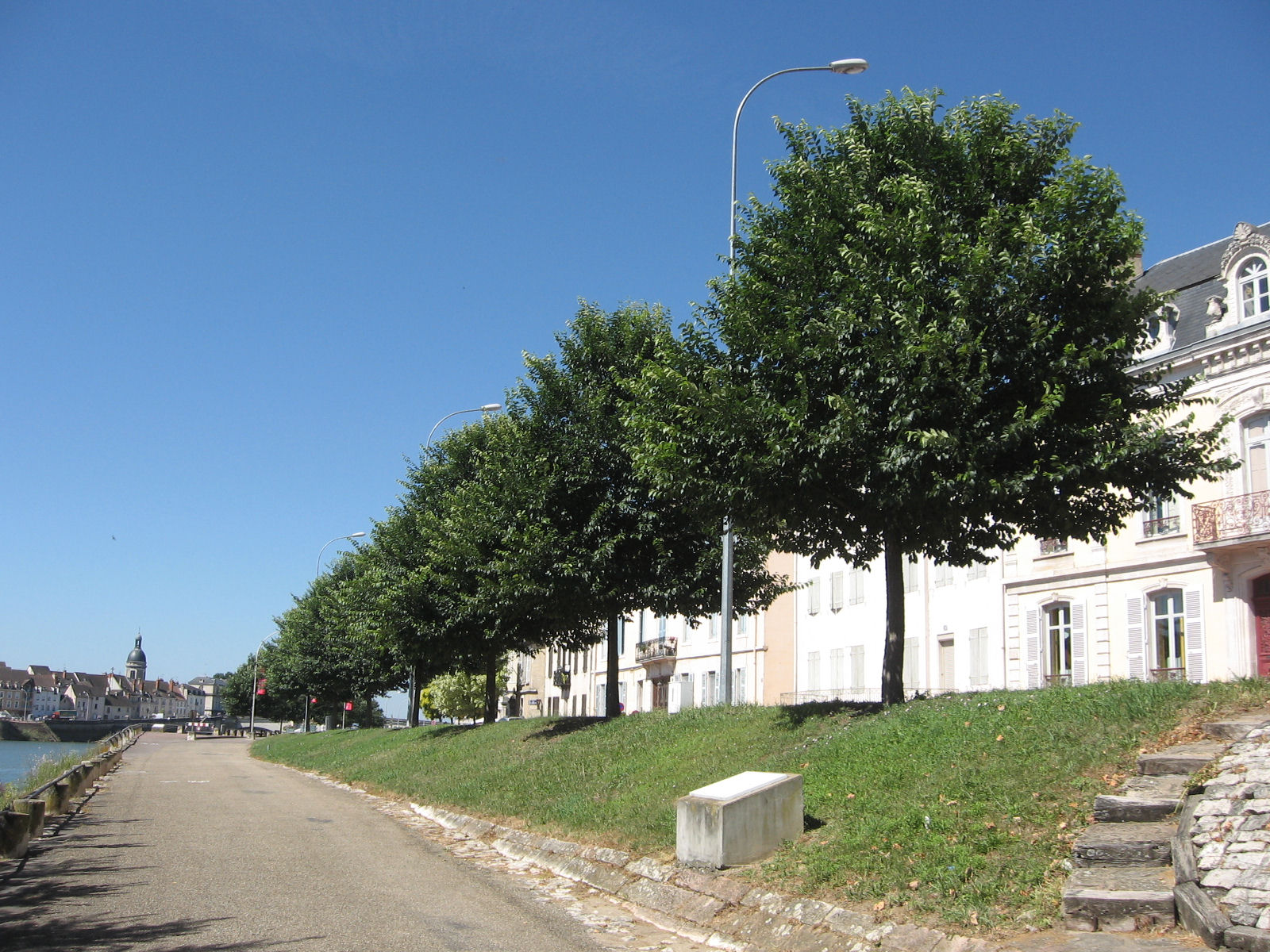
'New Horizon', Chalons-sur-Saône

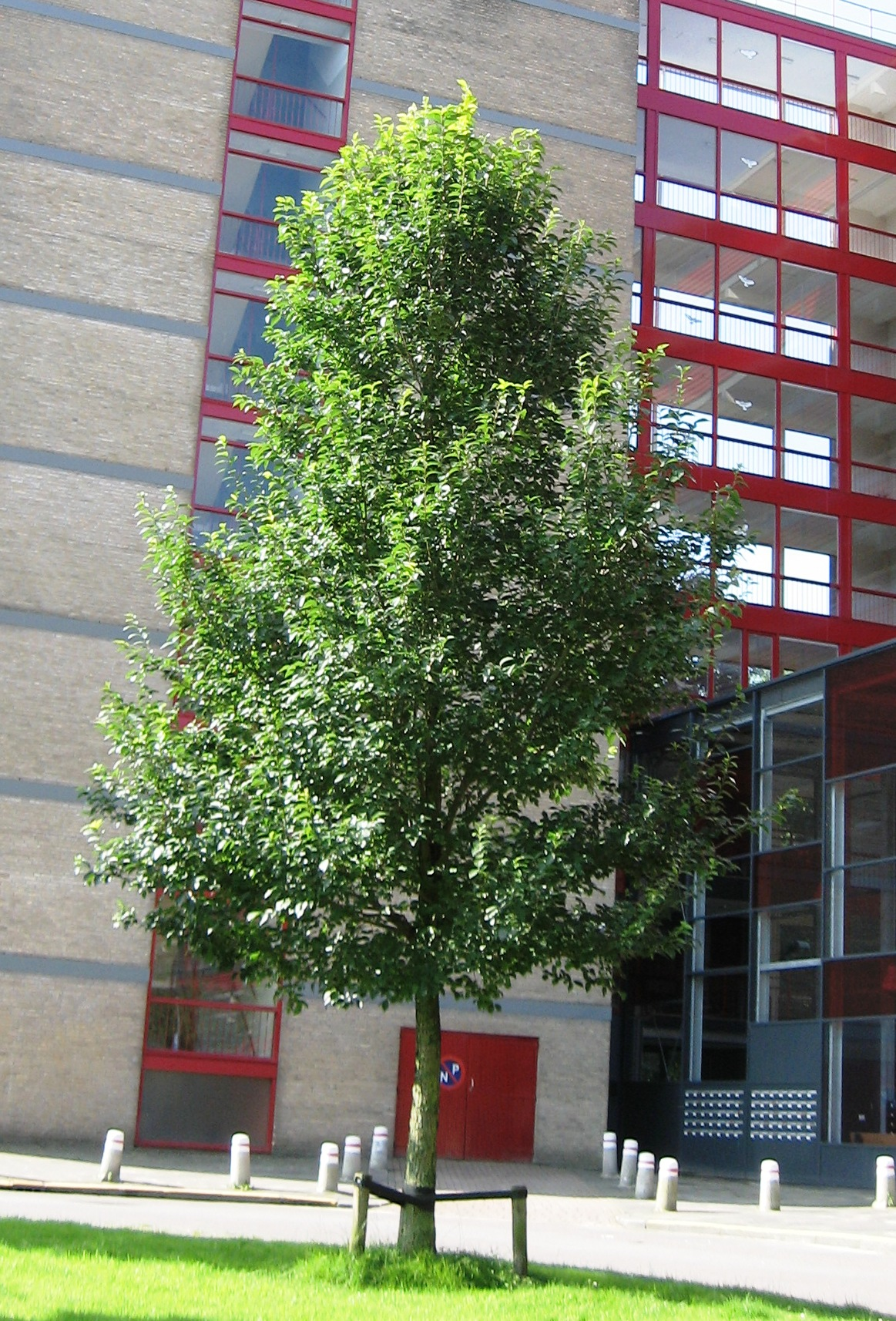
'New Horizon' Groningen, NL

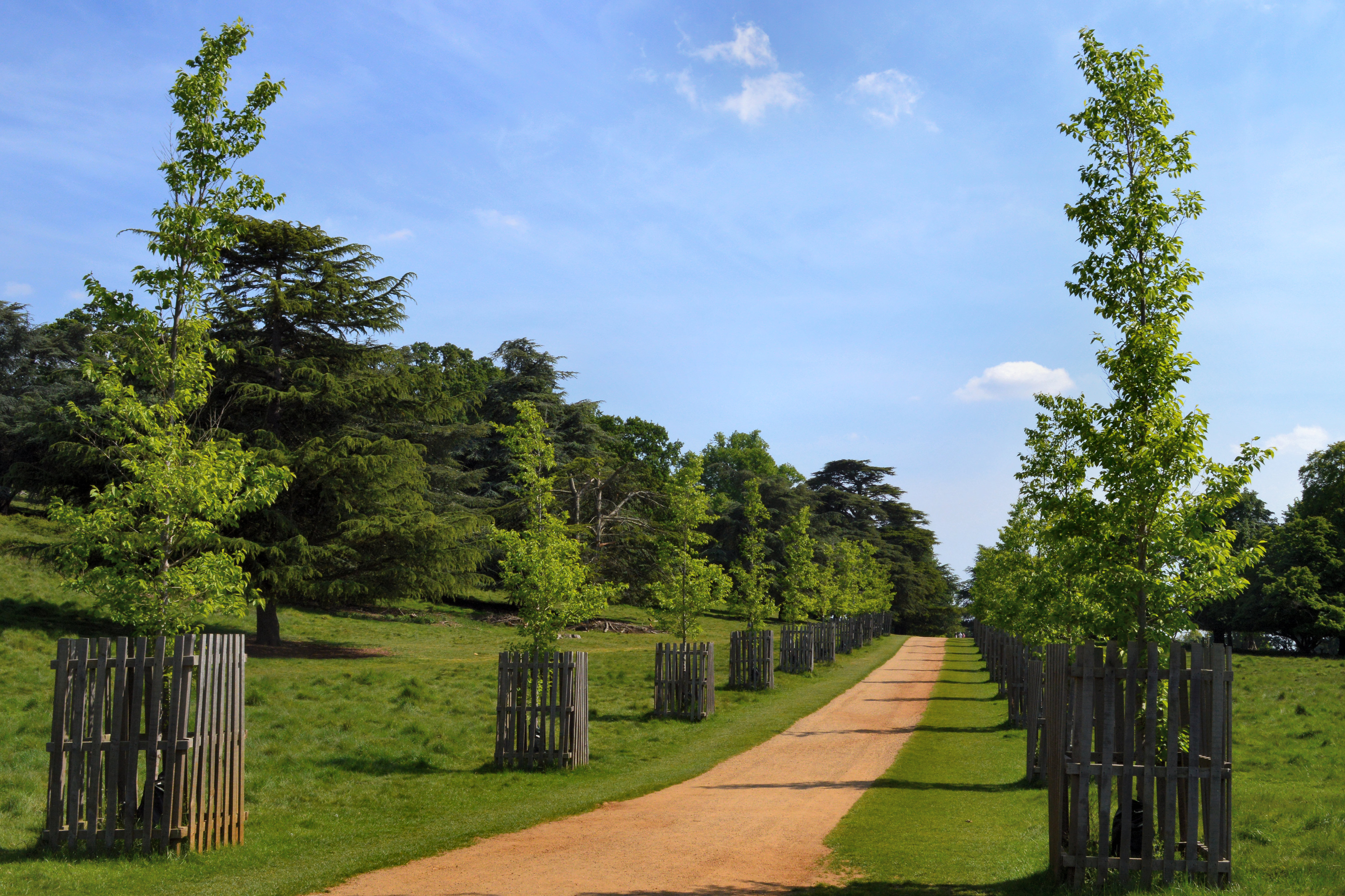
Young 'New Horizon', Petersham Gate, Richmond Park

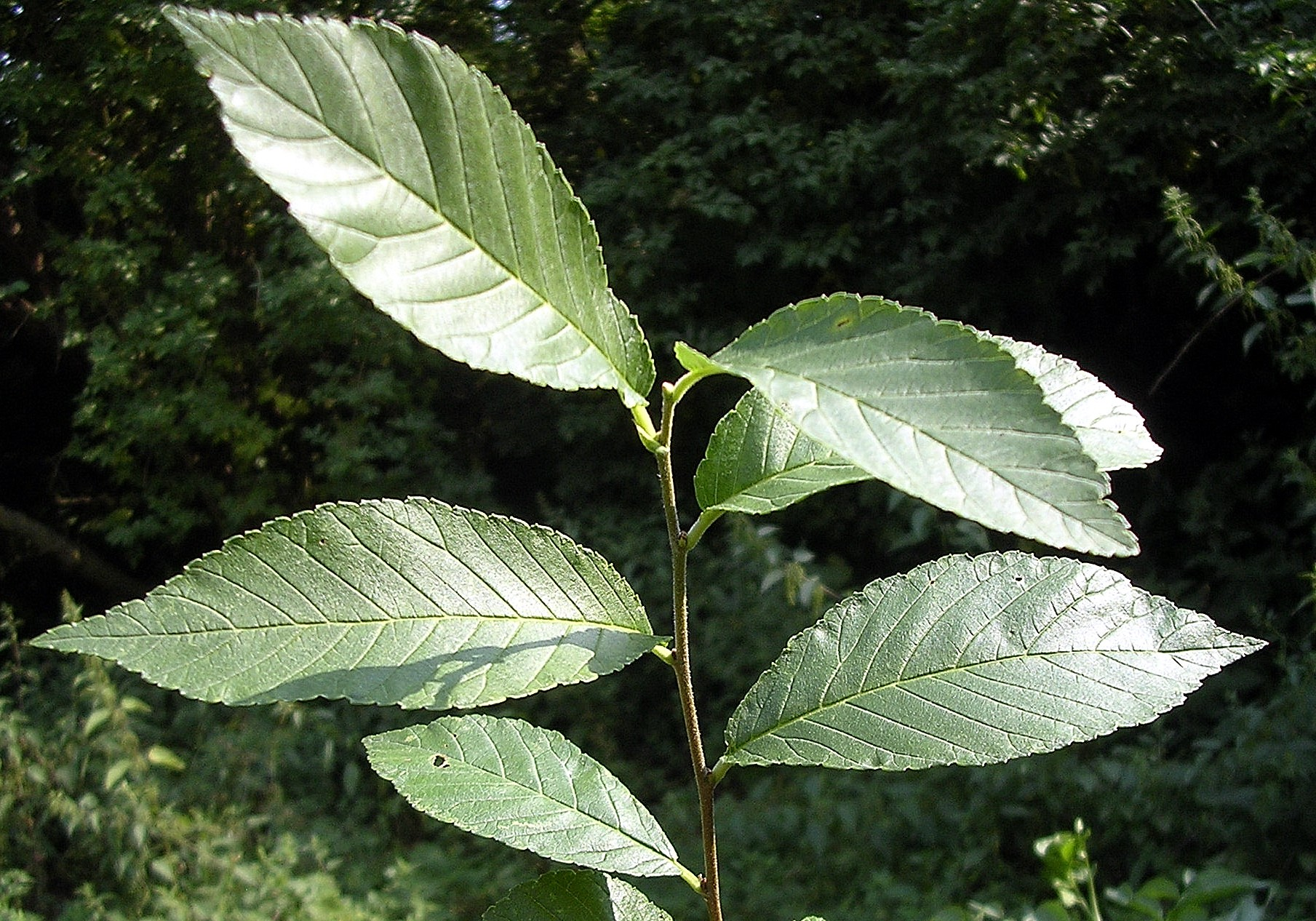
Juvenile leaves of 'New Horizon'

== Pests and diseases ==
'New Horizon' has a very high resistance to Dutch elm disease, rated 5 out of 5 in Europe; it is also resistant to elm leaf miner, and verticillium wilt. However, it has proven susceptible to attack by elm leaf beetle Xanthogaleruca luteola and Japanese beetle in the United States. Up until its patenting in 1993, no Coral Spot fungus infection had been observed in the US.

== Cultivation ==
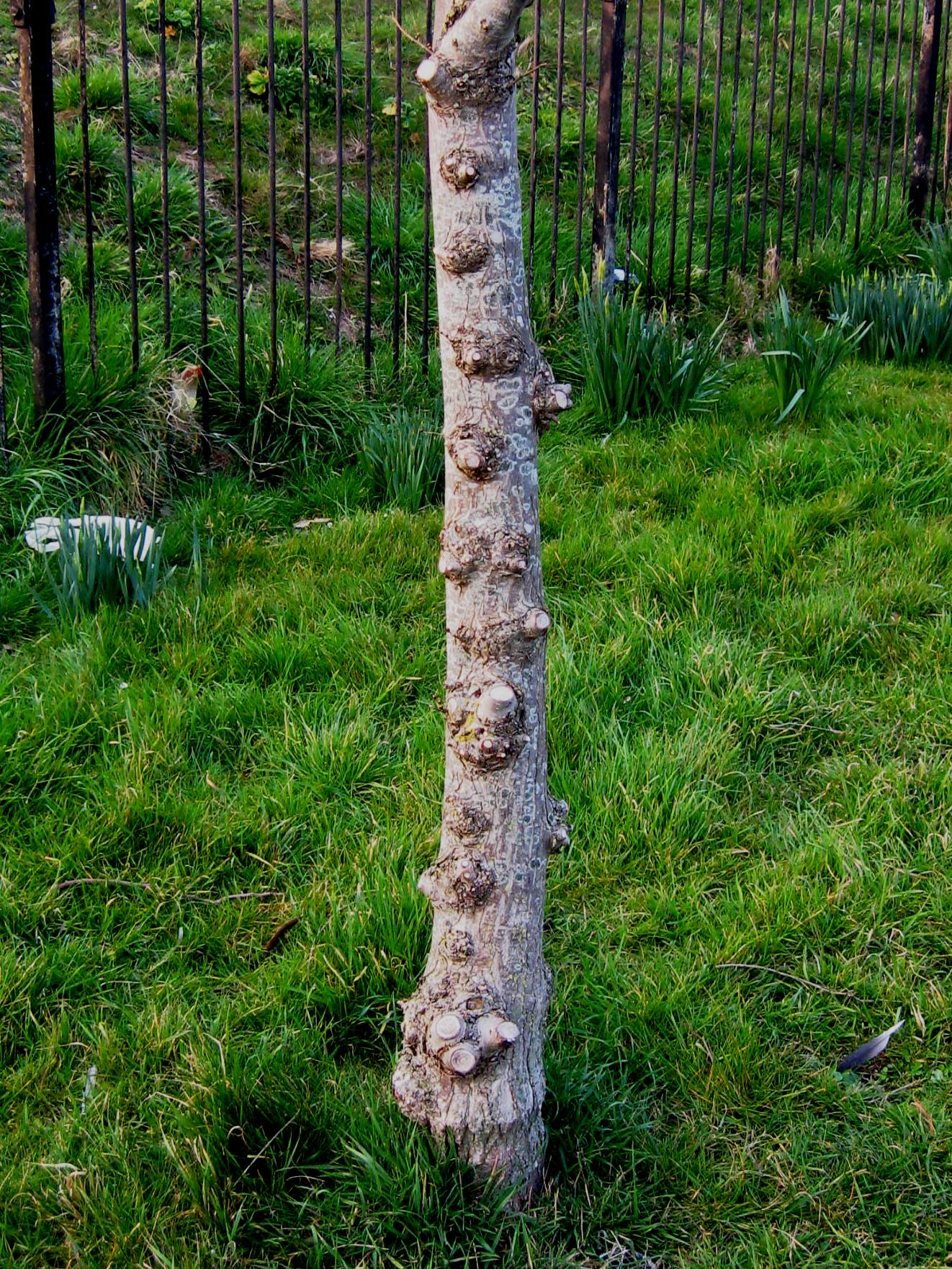
Nobbled stem arising from regular pruning

The tree has not been an unqualified success. In the elm trials conducted by the University of Minnesota, 'New Horizon' was found to need relatively high levels of maintenance, largely owing to its predilection for co-dominant leaders and heavy side branches. In the Netherlands, removal of sideshoots from the lower trunk was found to be necessary twice a year. In trials in eastern Arizona it often exhibited > 25% crown dieback over winter and a very high level of leaf scorch in summer. The tree is currently being evaluated in the National Elm Trial coordinated by Colorado State University.

'New Horizon' was introduced to Europe by the Conrad Appel nursery (ceased trading 2005) in Darmstadt, Germany, which propagated the tree under licence as one of the hybrid elms offered in the Resista series ; the trees were originally propagated by grafting, but this practice proved unsuccessful owing incompatibility with the rootstock; 50 trees planted in Pau had to be replaced. The tree is currently propagated by Eisele GmbH.

The tree was introduced to the UK and Ireland by Hillier Nurseries, who have sole distribution rights. 'New Horizon' was named 'Best New Plant Variety' by Horticulture Week in 2005, however, an assessment by Butterfly Conservation found its growth on heavy, poorly drained ground negligible. Nevertheless, the tree has tolerated flooding, by both freshwater in England, and seawater along the Baltic coast in Germany . Trees at exposed sites in Hampshire exhibited much the same degree of dieback experienced in the Arizona trials despite the extreme differences in climate. However no losses have been sustained, and in sheltered conditions on deep loam over chalk, 'New Horizon' grew healthily if relatively slowly, increasing in height by approximately 50 cm per annum, less than half the speed of the Dutch hybrids such as 'Dodoens' planted with it. The trees in the English trials first flowered aged 10 years, in late March.

In 2004, 80 trees were donated to the Greater London Council as part of the grower's European Elm City promotion; similar gifts were also made to Belfast, Cardiff (Pontcanna Fields, 100 trees planted in 2004), and Hamburg (the central City Park). In 2010, 100 trees were planted in the London borough of Enfield to aid and abet the conservation of the White-letter Hairstreak Satyrium w-album. Another hundred were included in the tree planting at the Olympic Park. Forty have been planted in Richmond Park, near the Dysart gate. Three, planted in 2014 as part of a resistant elms trial, stand by the Isis in Christ Church Meadow, Oxford. In 2020, a stand of 20 were planted at the National Memorial Arboretum in Alrewas, Staffordshire.

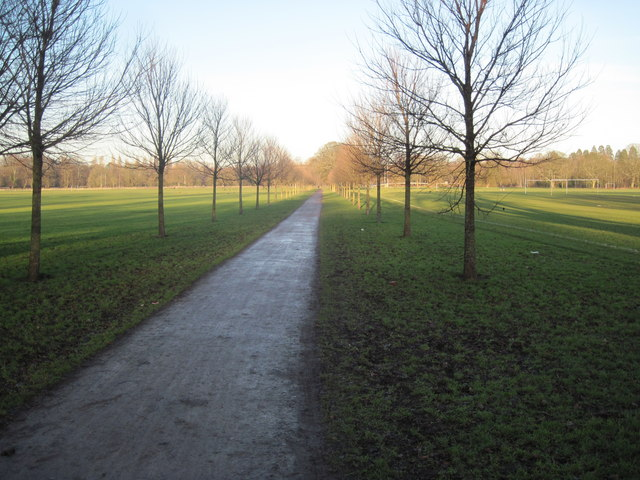
Winter 'New Horizon' avenue, Pontcanna Fields, Cardiff (2011)

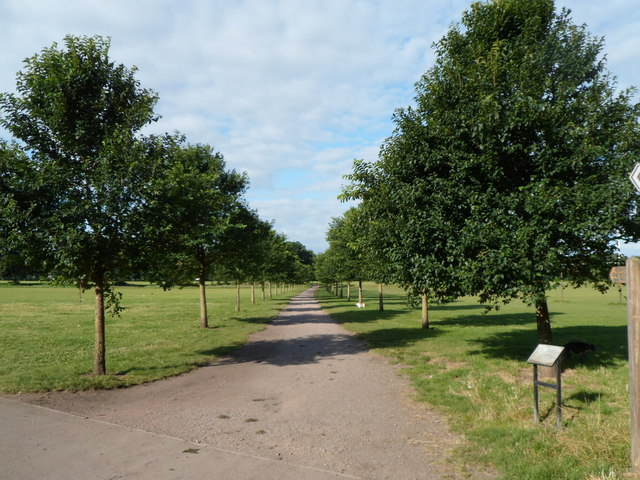
Avenue of 'New Horizon', Pontcanna Fields, Cardiff (2012)

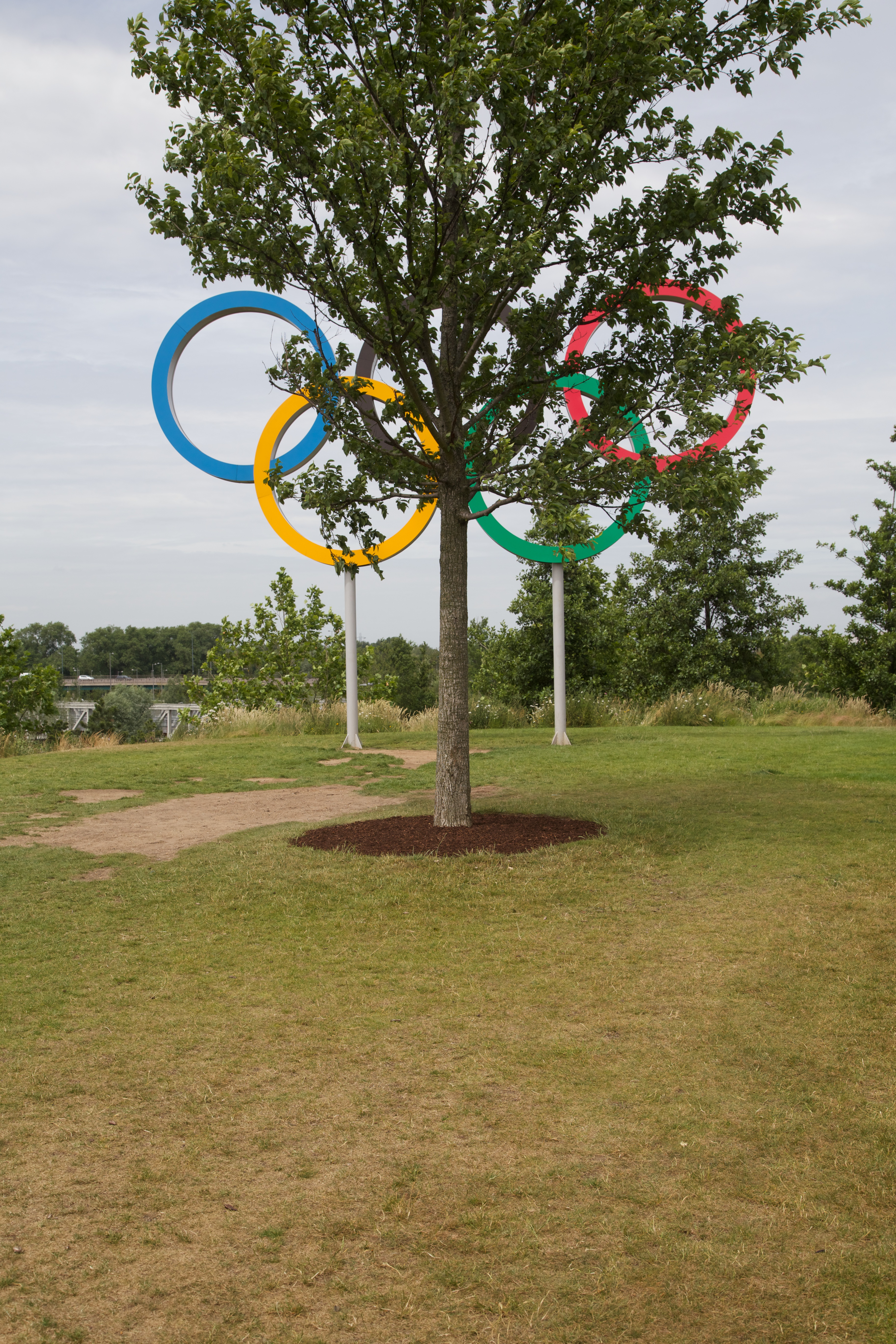
'New Horizon', Queen Elizabeth Olympic Park (2015)

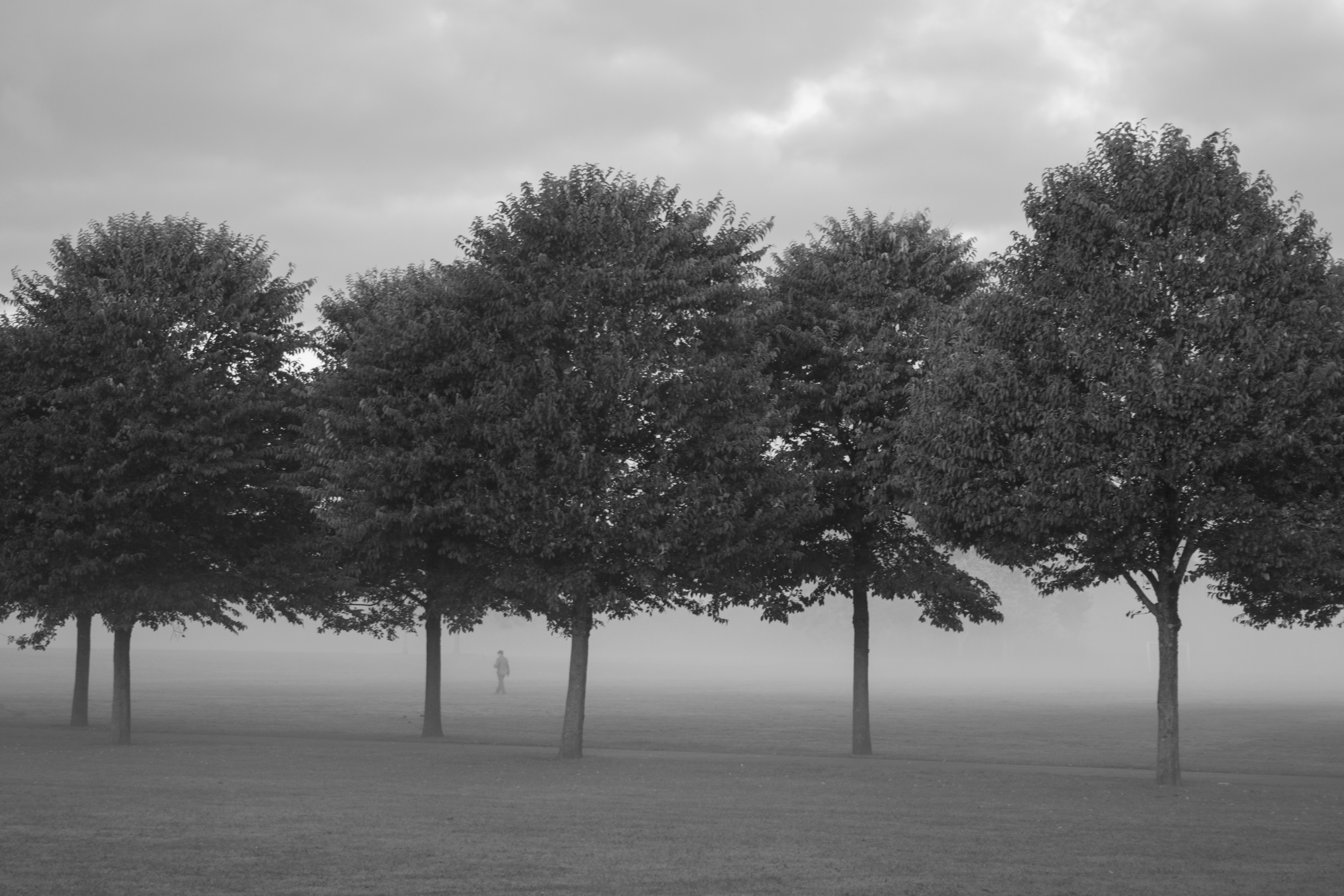
'New Horizon' avenue in mist, Pontcanna Fields, Cardiff (2016)

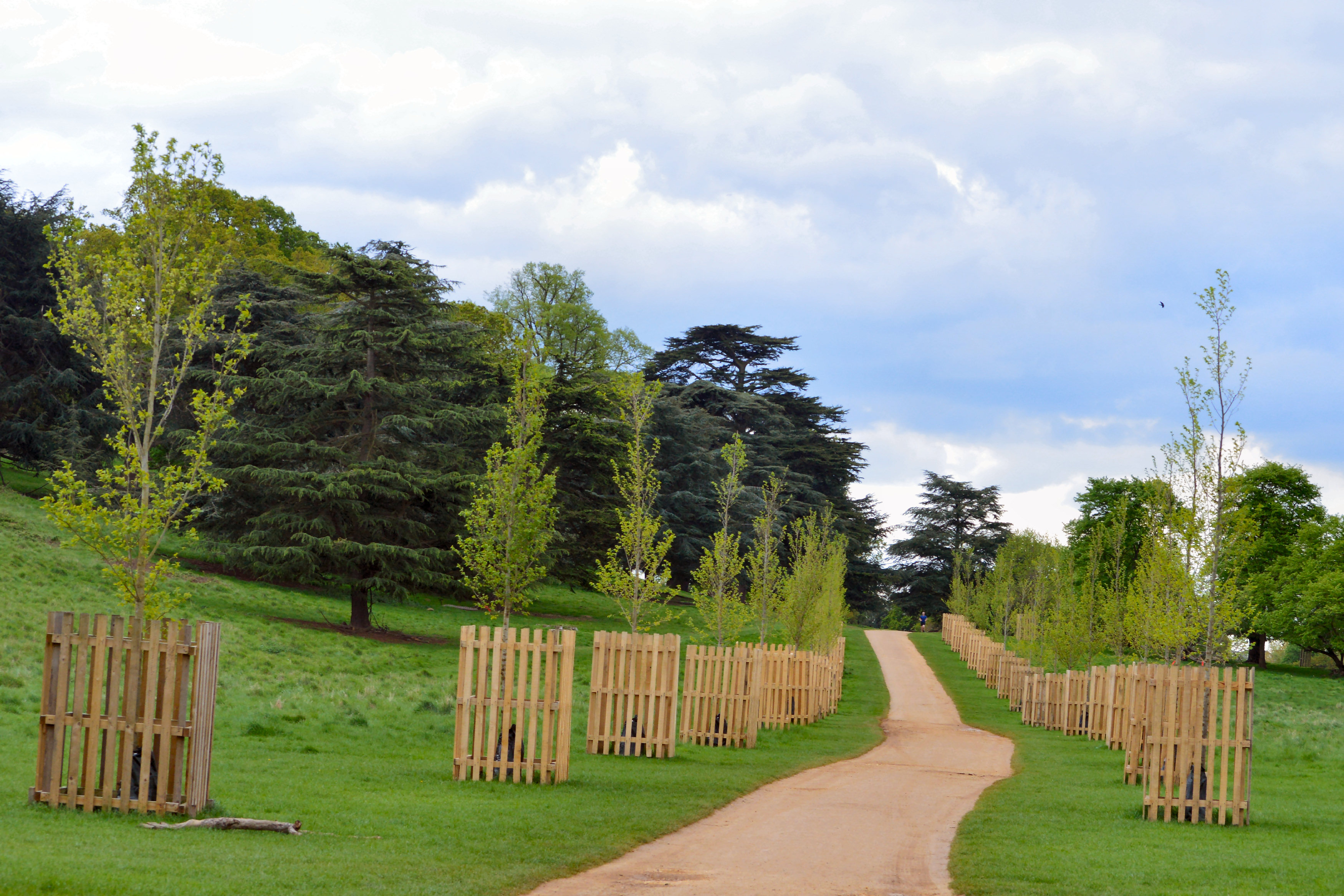
Elm Walk by Petersham Gate, Richmond Park: 47 'New Horizon' shortly after planting (2018)

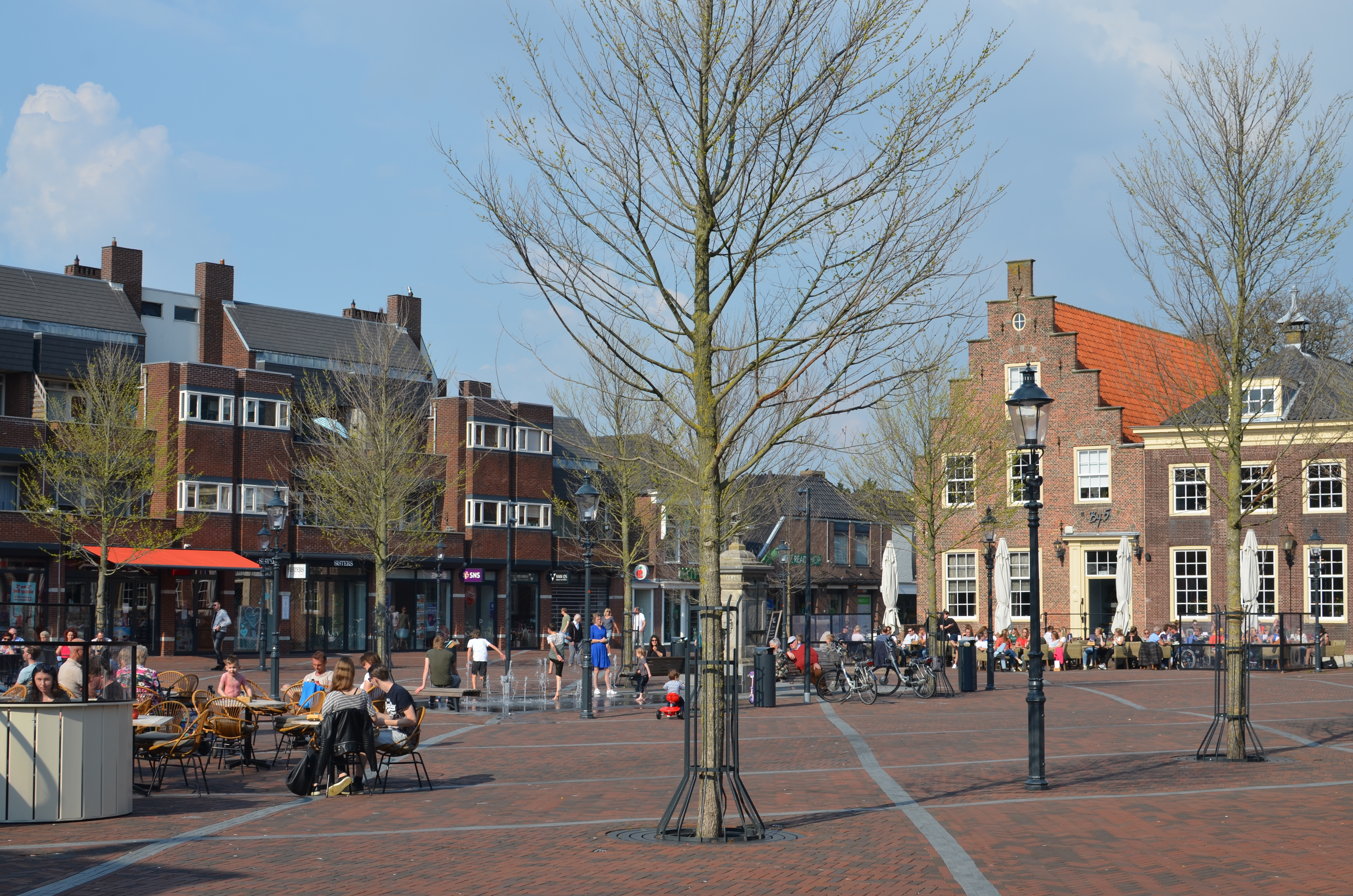
'New Horizon' and 'Rebona' alternating in the Wilhelminaplein, Naaldwijk (2019)

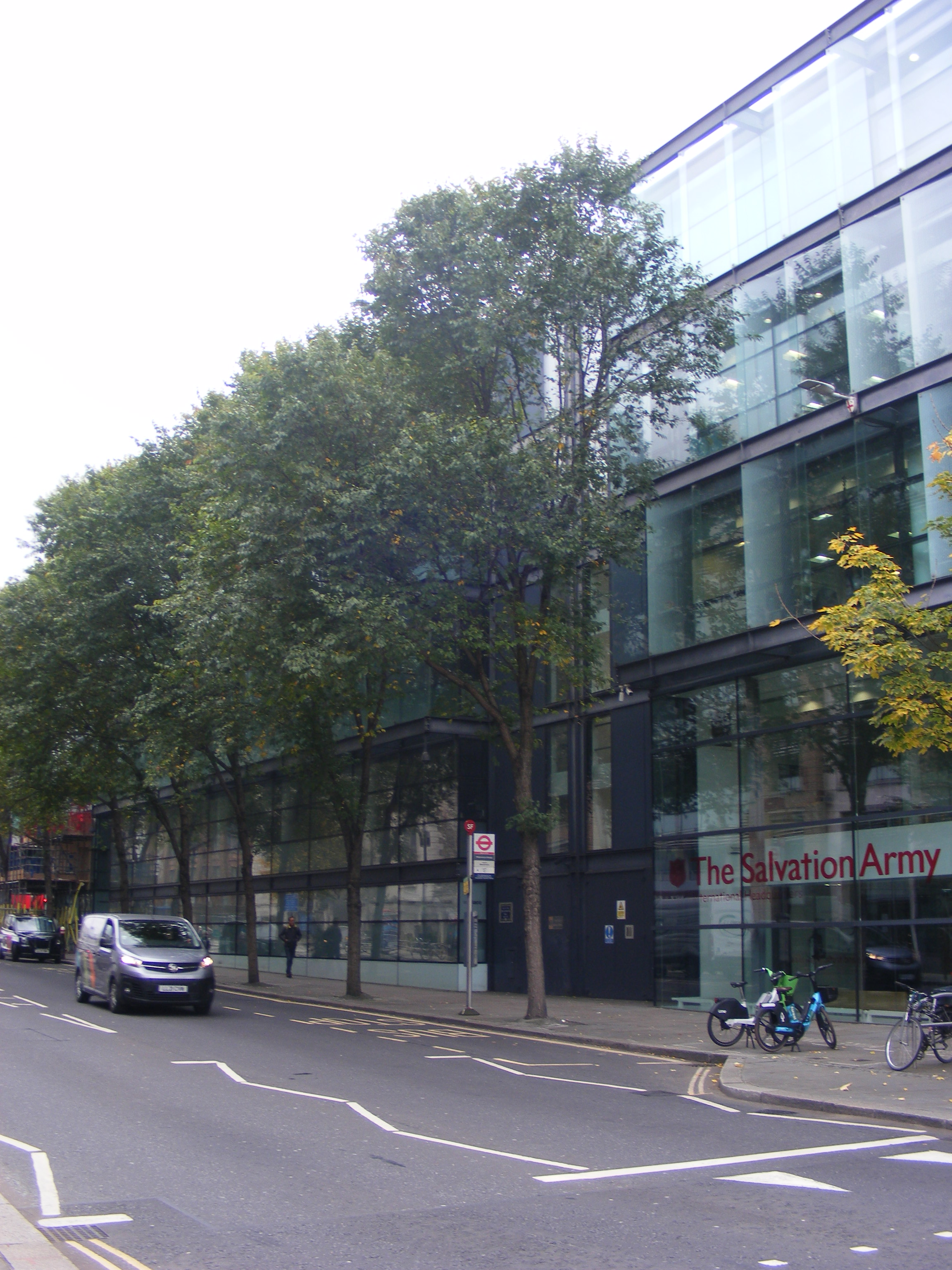
Line of 'New Horizon', Queen Victoria Street, London (2024)

== Conservation ==
'New Horizon' was found hosting the endangered White-letter Hairstreak at the Vauxhall Pleasure Gardens, London, in 2017; this is the first recorded instance of the butterfly breeding on the cultivar in the UK.

== Accessions ==
=== North America ===
- Bickelhaupt Arboretum, US. Acc. no. 01–008
- Chicago Botanic Garden, US. 3 trees, no other details available.
- Morton Arboretum, US. Acc. no. 271–2008.

=== Europe ===
- Arboretum de la Petite Loiterie Monthodon, France. No details available.
- Botanischer Garten Marburg, Marburg, Germany. No details available.
- Brighton & Hove City Council, UK. NCCPG Elm Collection. Planted frequently as a street tree.
- Grange Farm Arboretum, Sutton St James, Spalding, Lincolnshire, UK. Acc. no. not known.
- Great Fontley Farm, Fareham, UK. Butterfly Conservation elm trials plantation, one standard planted 2007.
- Royal Botanic Gardens, Kew, UK. Acc. no. not known.
- Royal Horticultural Society Gardens, Wisley, UK. No details available.
- Sir Harold Hillier Gardens, Romsey, UK. Acc. no. 2004.0177

== Nurseries ==
=== Europe ===
- Baumschule Grossbötzl Ort, Austria.
- Björkhaga Plantskola Veberöd, Sweden.
- Clasen & Co Rellingen, Germany.
- Eisele GmbH, Darmstadt, Germany.
- Hillier Nurseries, Ampfield, UK.
- Boomkwekerij Ebben, Cuijk, Netherlands.
- Pépinières Rouy-Imbert Monfavet-Avignon, France.
