= Ulmus davidiana var. japonica 'Reseda' =

Elm cultivar

- Variety: Ulmus davidiana var. japonica
- Cultivar: 'Reseda'
- Origin: US

The Japanese Elm cultivar Ulmus davidiana var. japonica 'Reseda' is an American cultivar raised by the Wisconsin Alumni Research Foundation (WARF) as clone no. 43–8. 'Reseda' was grown from seed sent from Hokkaido, Japan, in the late 1950s. Although not released in its own right, it was destined to become the female parent of the highly successful hybrid cultivars 'New Horizon' and 'Rebona'.

== Description ==
The leaves and fruit are similar to the species. The species does not sucker from roots.

== Pests and diseases ==
'Reseda' has a moderate resistance to Dutch elm disease.

== Cultivation ==
Several examples are known to survive in Wisconsin, notably one in the garden of the late Eugene Byron Smalley. Specimens of the clone were sent from Wisconsin to Conrad Appel KG, of Darmstadt, Germany, which named the tree 'Reseda' (possibly after reseda green), but ultimately did not market the tree owing to its only moderate resistance to DED. NB: The tree was later confused with a pendulous form of Ulmus pumila in Germany, and specimens so misnamed may still survive there.

== Accessions ==
Not known.
