= Ulmus davidiana var. japonica 'Prospector' =

Elm cultivar

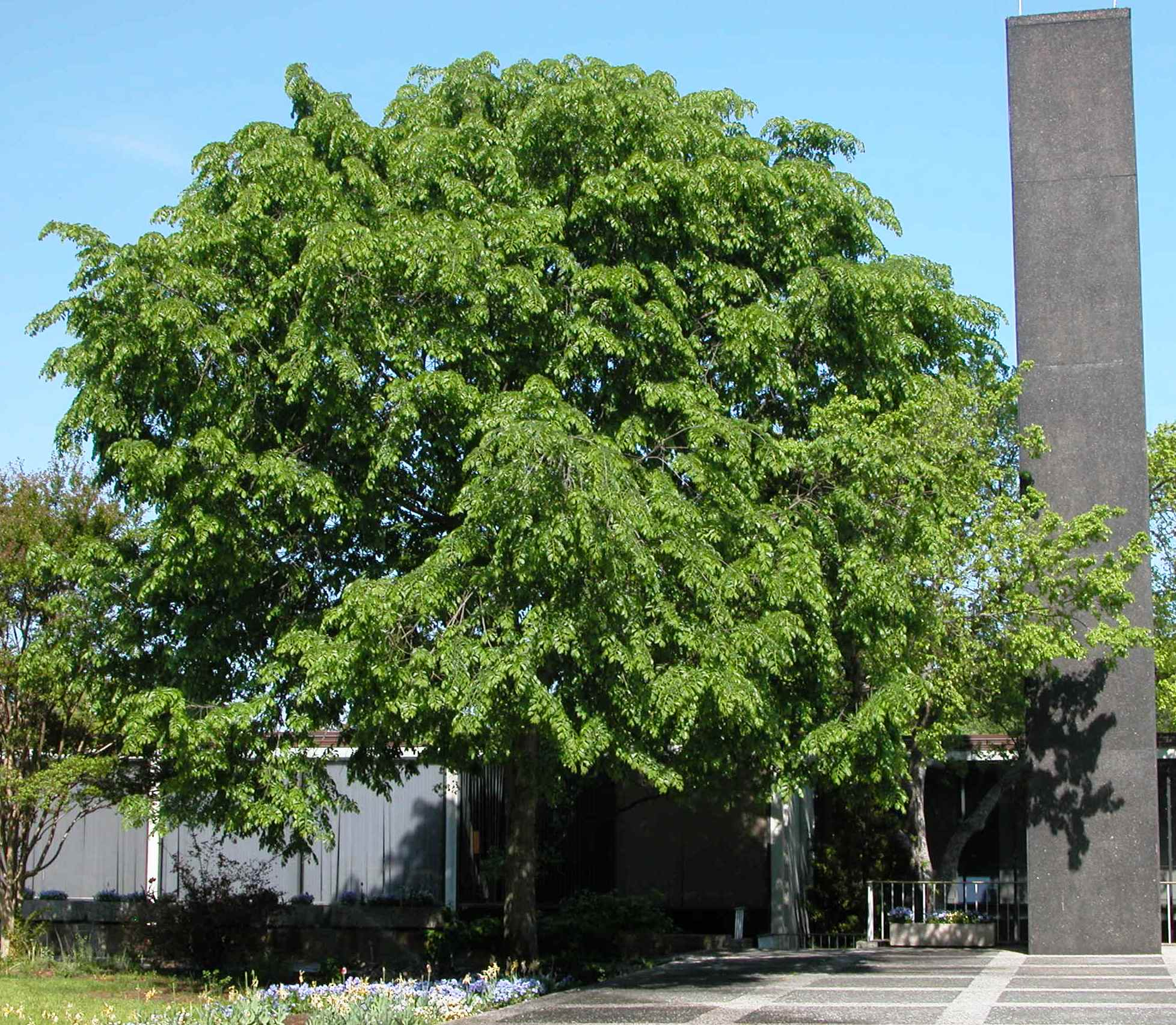
- 'Prospector'
- Variety: Ulmus davidiana var. japonica
- Cultivar: 'Prospector'
- Origin: National Arboretum, US

The Japanese elm cultivar Ulmus davidiana var. japonica 'Prospector' was originally treated as a cultivar of Wilson's elm U. wilsoniana Schneid., a species sunk as Ulmus davidiana var. japonica by Fu. A U.S. National Arboretum introduction (NA 55398), it was selected in 1975 from a batch of 1965 seedlings in Delaware, Ohio, and released without patent restrictions in 1990. 'Prospector' proved moderately successful in the US National Elm Trial, averaging a survival rate of 76% overall.

'Prospector' was introduced to the UK in 2009, by Hampshire & Isle of Wight Branch, Butterfly Conservation, as part of an assessment of DED-resistant cultivars as potential hosts of the endangered White-letter Hairstreak.

== Description ==
'Prospector' is a medium-size elm with a light-grey bark, attaining a height of approximately 14 m and developing a vase shape broadly similar to the American elm but with lower-drooping branches . The deep-green, glossy obovate leaves are < 11 cm long by 8 cm wide, emerging orange-red and turning yellow in autumn. The perfect, apetalous wind-pollinated flowers emerge in early spring, before the leaves. The samara, 20 mm long by 8–10 mm wide, is narrowly obovate, the seed between centre and notch. Specimens grown in Hampshire, England, first flowered and fruited aged 10 years. The tree was also the first to flower every year, usually by mid-January.

The tree grows at a comparatively modest pace in the United States; specimens planted at UC Davis as part of the National Elm Trial increased in height by 0.85 m and diameter at breast height by 2 cm in the first few years after establishment The species does not sucker from roots.

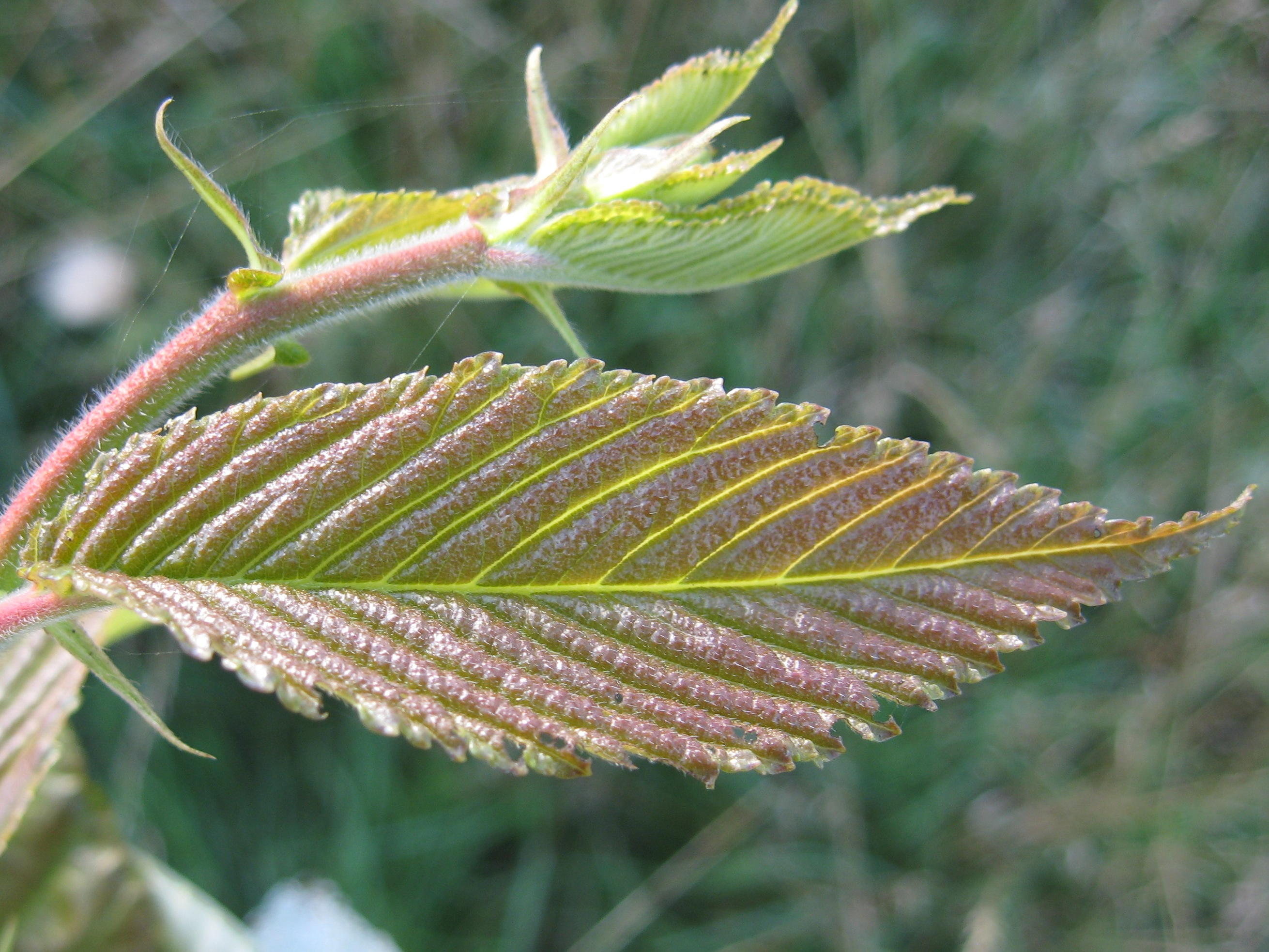
'Prospector' emergent leaf colouring.

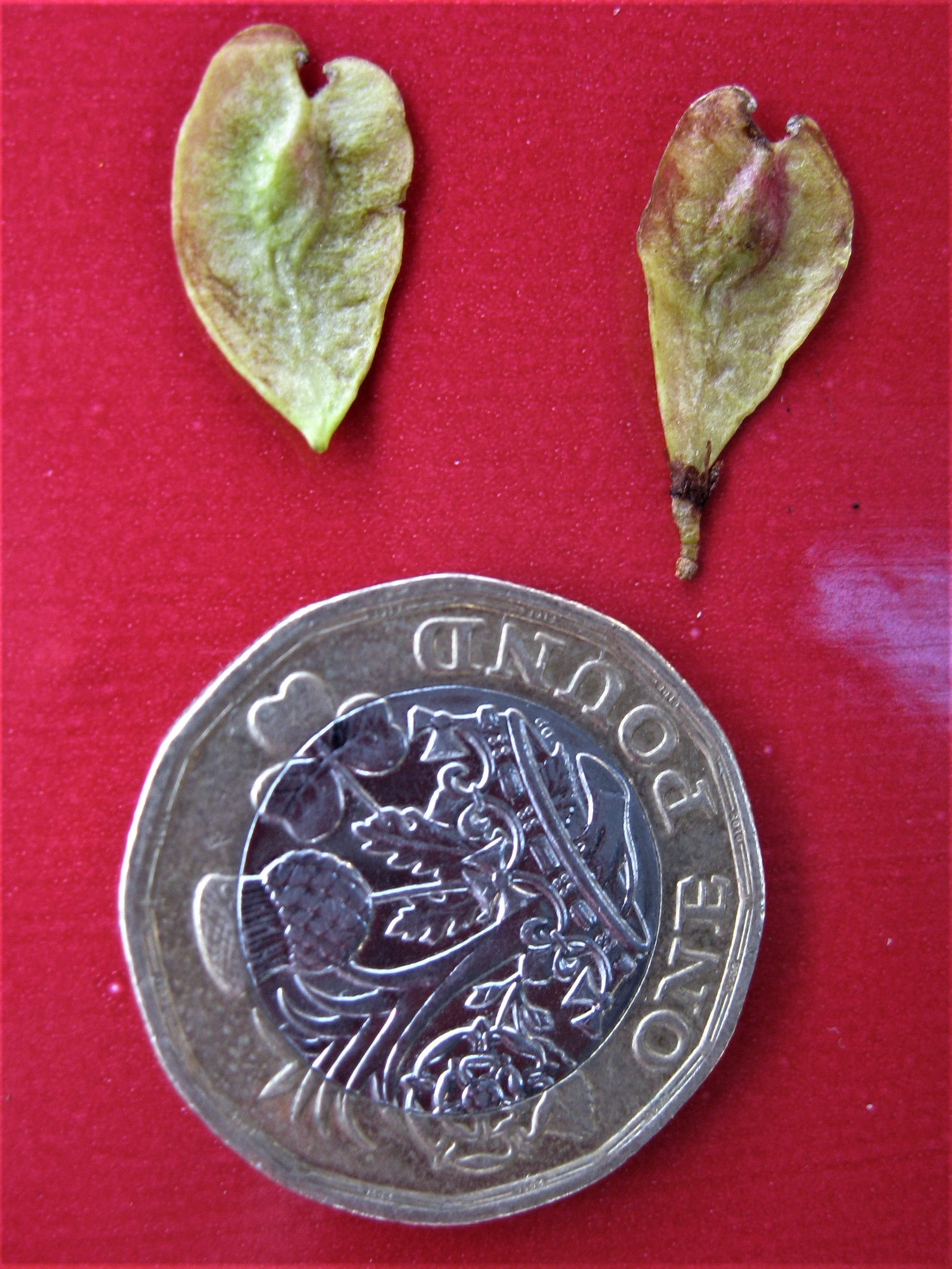
'Prospector' samarae with £1 coin as scale

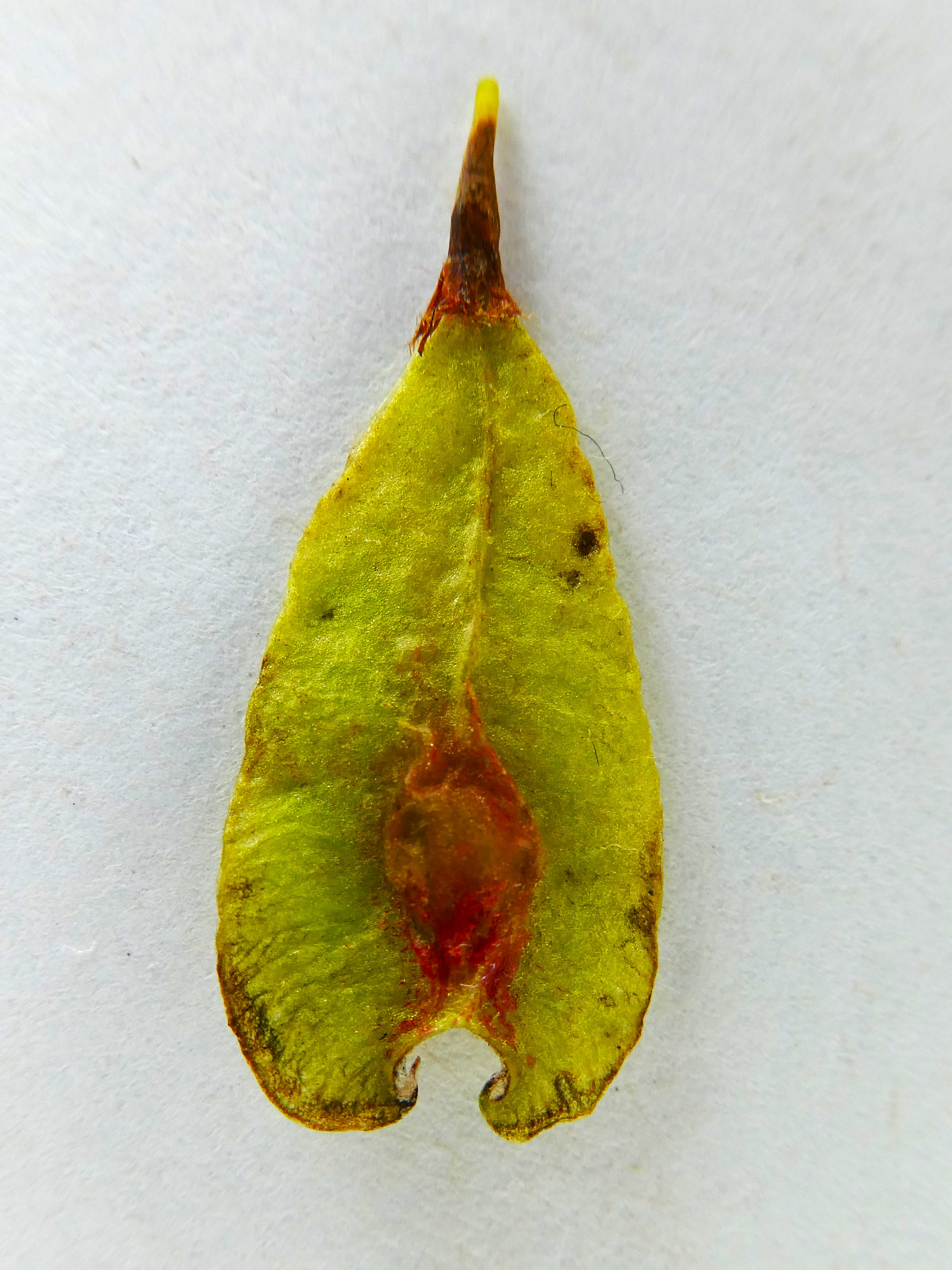
'Prospector' samara

== Pests and diseases ==
'Prospector' has featured in several elm trials in the United States, notably those conducted by the Northern Arizona University at Holbrook, eastern Arizona, and Townsend & Douglass which established that the tree's survival rate after inoculation with the Dutch elm disease pathogen was 100%. In trials in California, the tree exhibited a singular sensitivity to boron concentrations of > 200 ppm in the soil, causing marginal necrosis on the leaves. Moreover, although also highly resistant to elm leaf beetle Xanthogaleruca luteola (no damage whatsoever was recorded in the aforementioned trials at U C Davis) 'Prospector' is a favoured food of leaf hoppers which can seriously disfigure foliage by midsummer, and is moderately susceptible to the Japanese beetle. Tolerance of elm yellows in the United States was found to be poor. However, the disease has proved difficult to transmit experimentally to this cultivar, and there appear to be no natural infections.

== Cultivation ==
'Prospector' performed well in California, although it "needed substantial training in the first two to three years". In Arizona, the tree proved unsuited to the hot, arid climate and suffered > 50% leaf scorch. In trials conducted by the University of Minnesota, 'Prospector' was appreciated for its extraordinary vigour but faulted for the weakness of its wood, notably stem breakage owing to bark inclusion. Nonetheless, it is considered by the U.S. Department of Agriculture (USDA) as suitable for Zones 4–7. The tree is currently being evaluated in the National Elm Trial coordinated by Colorado State University.

'Prospector' was introduced to Europe by Butterfly Conservation in 2009 as part of its elm trials programme in Hampshire but has exhibited very slow growth, its stem increasing by just 2 mm in diameter at breast height per annum.

The tree was also included in trials in New Zealand undertaken by Hortresearch at Palmerston North in the 1990s.

== Synonymy ==
Ulmus wilsoniana C. K. Schneid. 'Prospector'.

== Hybrid cultivars ==
- 'Patriot'

== Accessions ==
North America

- Arnold Arboretum, US. Acc. no. 134-2002
- Bartlett Tree Experts, North Carolina, US. Acc. nos. 2001-261/2/3, 2001–488, 2001-490
- Brenton Arboretum, Dallas Center, Iowa, US. 5 trees, acquired 2009. Acc. no. not known.
- Dominion Arboretum, Ottawa, Ontario, Canada, No acc. details.
- Holden Arboretum, US. Acc. no. 95-141
- Morton Arboretum, US. Acc. no. 61–2003, 213-2012
- Parker Arboretum, Parker, Colorado, US. No acc. details
- Scott Arboretum, US. Acc. no. 91-241
- Smith College, US. Acc. nos. 13303, 502
- University of Idaho Arboretum, US. Three trees, Acc. nos. 1995011, 1995085
- U S National Arboretum, Washington, D.C., US. Acc. no. not known.

Europe

- Grange Farm Arboretum, Sutton St James, Spalding, Lincs., UK. Acc. no. 823.
- Great Fontley, Fareham, UK. Butterfly Conservation Elm trials plantation, Home Field, one 0.8 m whip planted 2009.
- Istituto per la Protezione delle Piante, Florence, Italy. 2 small plants, (2010).
- Royal Botanic Garden Edinburgh, UK. Acc. no. 20092086. Listed as U. japonica 'Prospector'.
- Sir Harold Hillier Gardens, Romsey, Hampshire, UK. Acc. no. 2009.0454.

== Nurseries ==
North America

(Widely available)

Europe

- Pan-global Plants , Frampton on Severn, Gloucestershire, UK
