= Japanese elm =

Japanese elm is a common name for several plants and may refer to:

- Ulmus davidiana var. japonica
- Zelkova serrata, native to Japan, Korea, eastern China, and Taiwan
