= Ulmus 'Morfeo' =

Elm cultivar

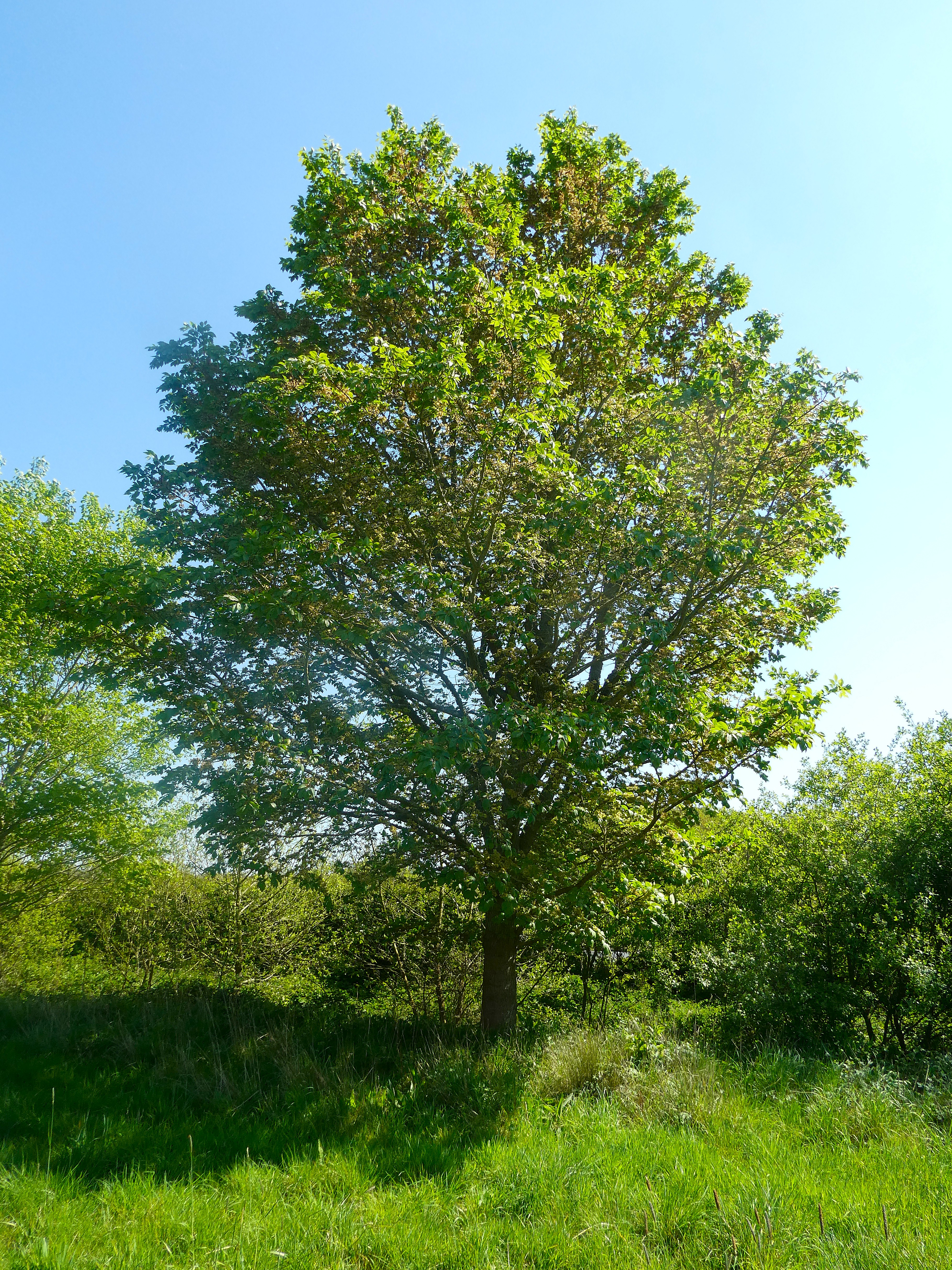
- 'Morfeo', Boarhunt, England
- Genus: Ulmus
- Hybrid parentage: (U. × hollandica × U. minor) × U. chenmoui
- Cultivar: 'Morfeo'
- Origin: IPP, Florence, Italy

Ulmus 'Morfeo' is a hybrid elm cultivar raised by the Istituto per la Protezione delle Piante (IPP), Florence, in 2000. 'Morfeo' arose from a crossing of the Dutch hybrid clone '405' (female parent) and the Chenmou Elm, the latter a small tree from the provinces of Anhui and Jiangsu in eastern China, The '405' clone is a full sister of 'Groeneveld', a crossing of an English U. × hollandica and a French U. minor from the Barbier Nursery, Orléans.

'Morfeo' was patented and released to commerce in 2011. It was solely propagated by the Georgio Tesi nursery in Italy, but production had ceased by 2020. The tree was introduced to the UK in 2006 (as 'FL509') by Hampshire and Isle of Wight Branch, Butterfly Conservation, as part of an assessment of DED-resistant cultivars as potential hosts of the endangered White-letter Hairstreak.

== Description ==
'Morfeo' is a robust, fast-growing tree able to freestand at a very early age. The stem commences forking at between 1.5 and 2 m from the ground, the branches on juvenile trees with irregular patches of corky bark. The reddish branchlets bear mid – green elliptic leaves, < 120 mm (avg. 88 mm) long × < 80 mm (avg. 56 mm) broad with 10 mm petioles. The leaves closely resemble those of the Field Elm, with typically asymmetric base and acuminate apex; they turn crimson in late October, before falling in early November. The sessile samarae ripen in mid May, and are narrowly obovate, 17–22 mm long × 9 – 13 mm broad with the seed offset next to the notched apex. In the UK the tree begins flowering in its fourth year, the perfect, apetalous wind-pollinated flowers appearing in mid March. The tree was noted to start suckering from roots in Italy when aged about 5 years, but this has not been observed in the Butterfly Conservation trials in the UK.

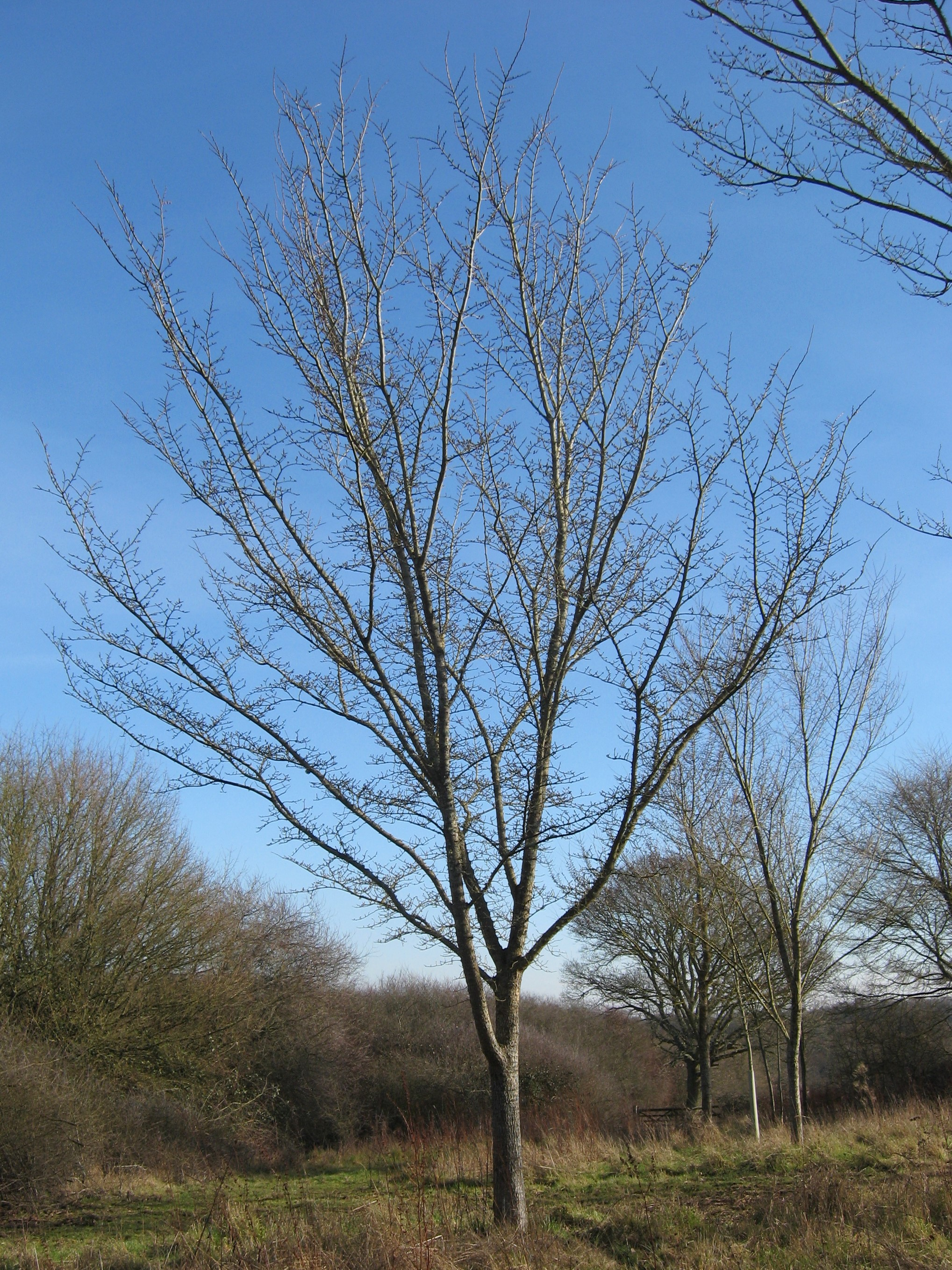
'Morfeo' in winter

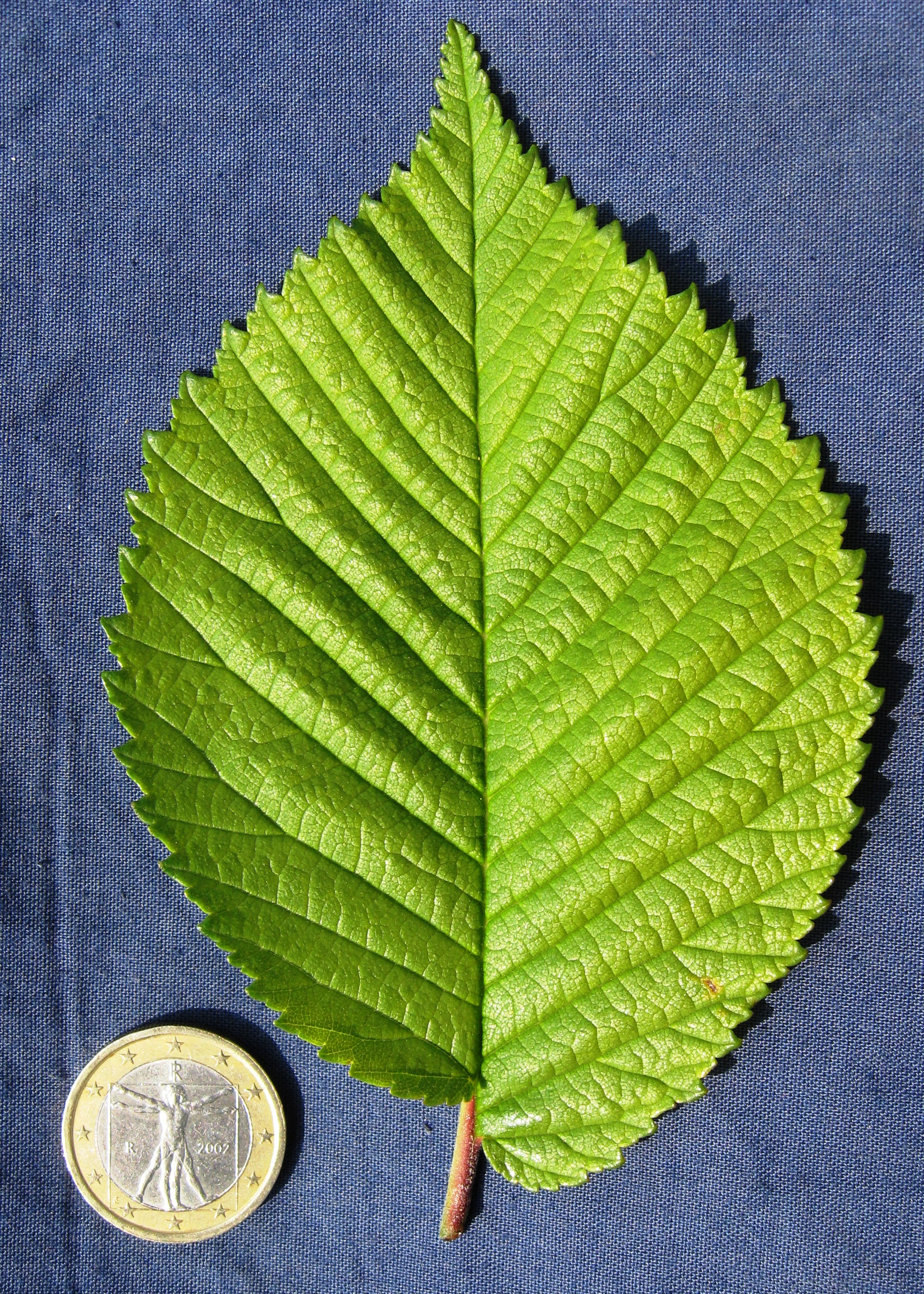
'Morfeo' leaf and Euro coin.

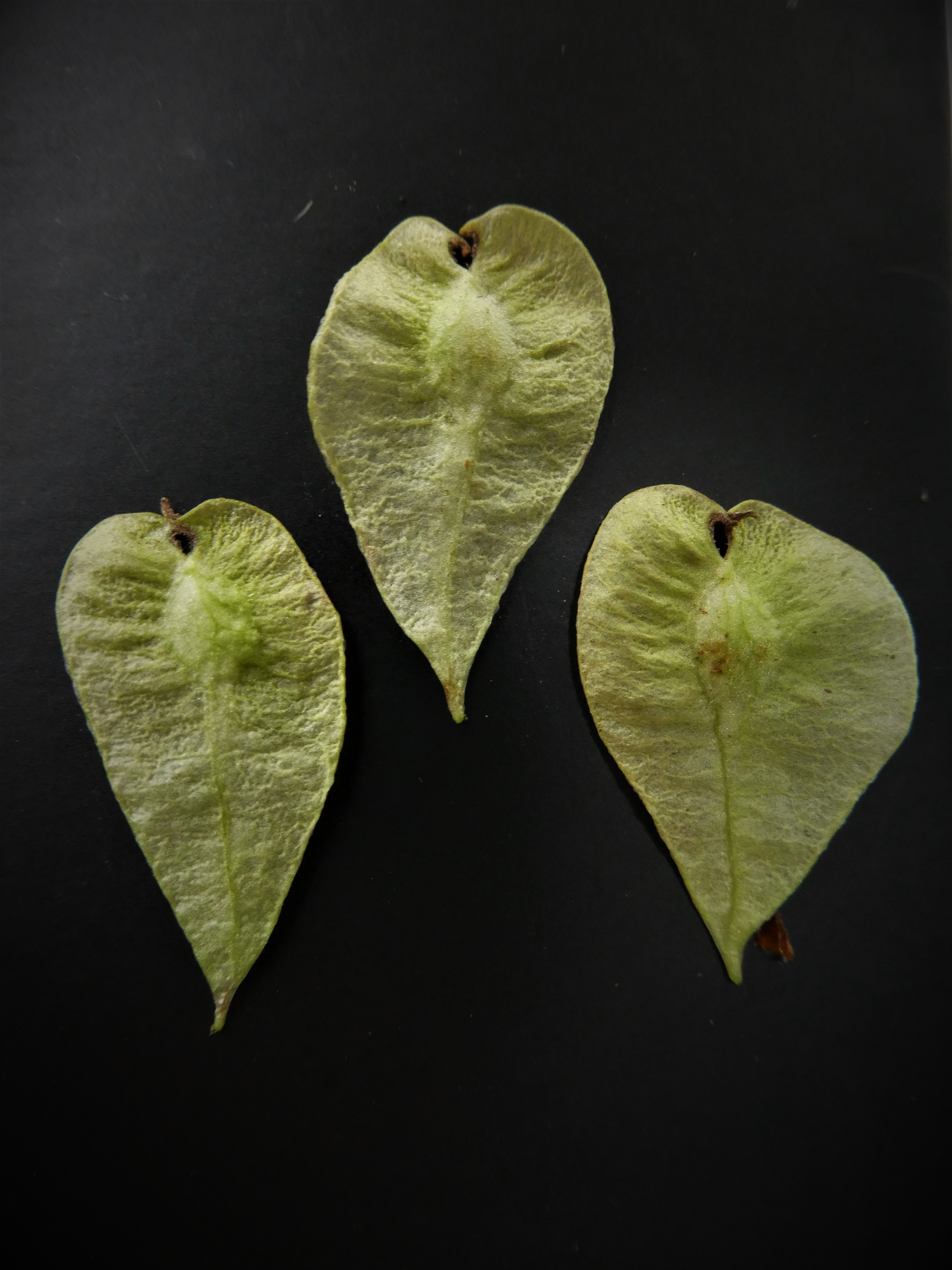
Samarae

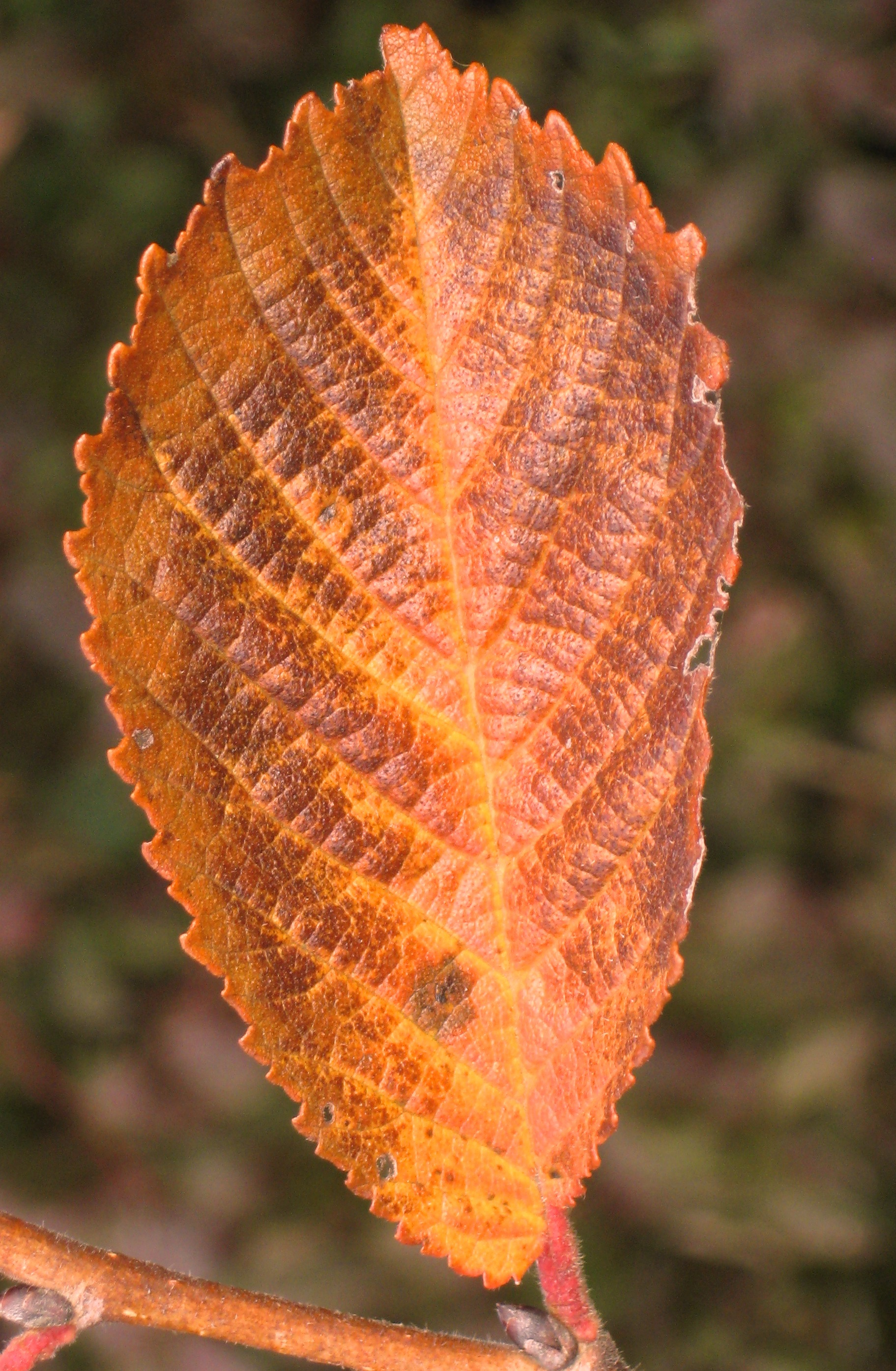
'Morfeo' leaf colour, late October.

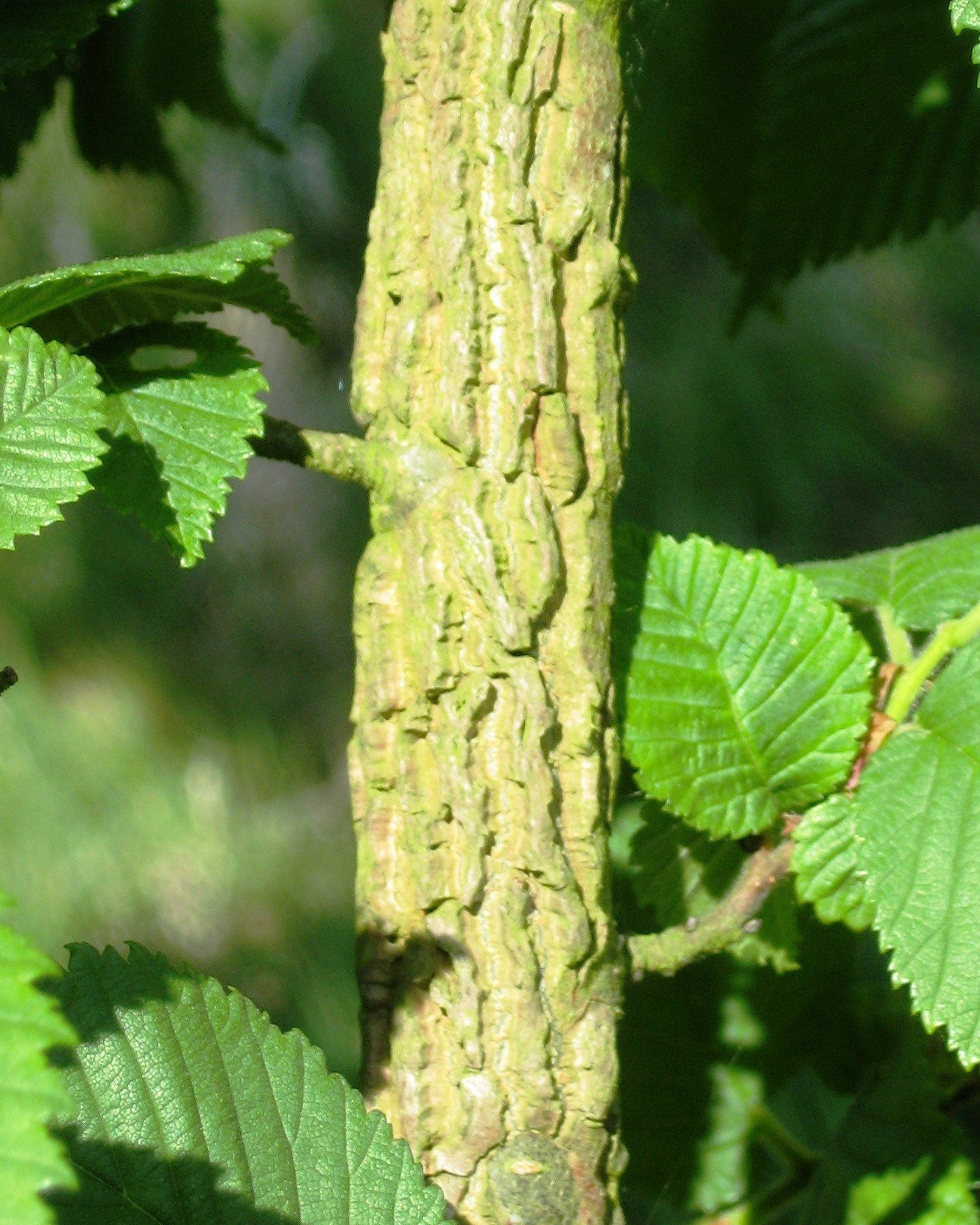
'Morfeo' corky bark on juvenile branch.

== Pests and diseases ==
'Morfeo' has a very high resistance to Dutch elm disease. In trials conducted by the Istituto per la Protezione delle Piante, Florence, 'Morfeo' sustained just 4.7% defoliation and 0.0% dieback when inoculated with unnaturally high concentrations of the fungal pathogen, compared with 19.8% / 11.7% resp. for Lutece, and 50% / 35.5% resp. for 'Lobel'. However, 'Morfeo' is particularly susceptible to the phytoplasma phloem necrosis, commonly known as elm yellows, a disease as yet (2025) unknown in the UK.

== Cultivation ==
'Morfeo' is no longer in commerce in Italy owing to its singular susceptibility to elm yellows. The tree was introduced to the UK in 2006 as a potential host plant for the White-letter Hairstreak butterfly Satyrium w-album by Butterfly Conservation, and has proven one of the two fastest-growing (the other 'Ademuz') of 14 cultivars on trial on a shallow sandy, gravelly loam over Reading Beds clay, increasing in stem diameter by 2.1 cm per annum. 'Morfeo' is also tolerant of waterlogged alluvium along rivers, and grows particularly well on exposed, elevated, chalk atop Portsdown Hill near Portsmouth. As of 2025, IPP have waived patent restrictions, and thus the tree may be freely propagated in the UK. 'Morfeo' was introduced to North America in 2010, at the National Arboretum, Washington, D.C., and released from quarantine in 2013; it is not known to have been introduced to Australasia.

=== 'Phantasos' ===
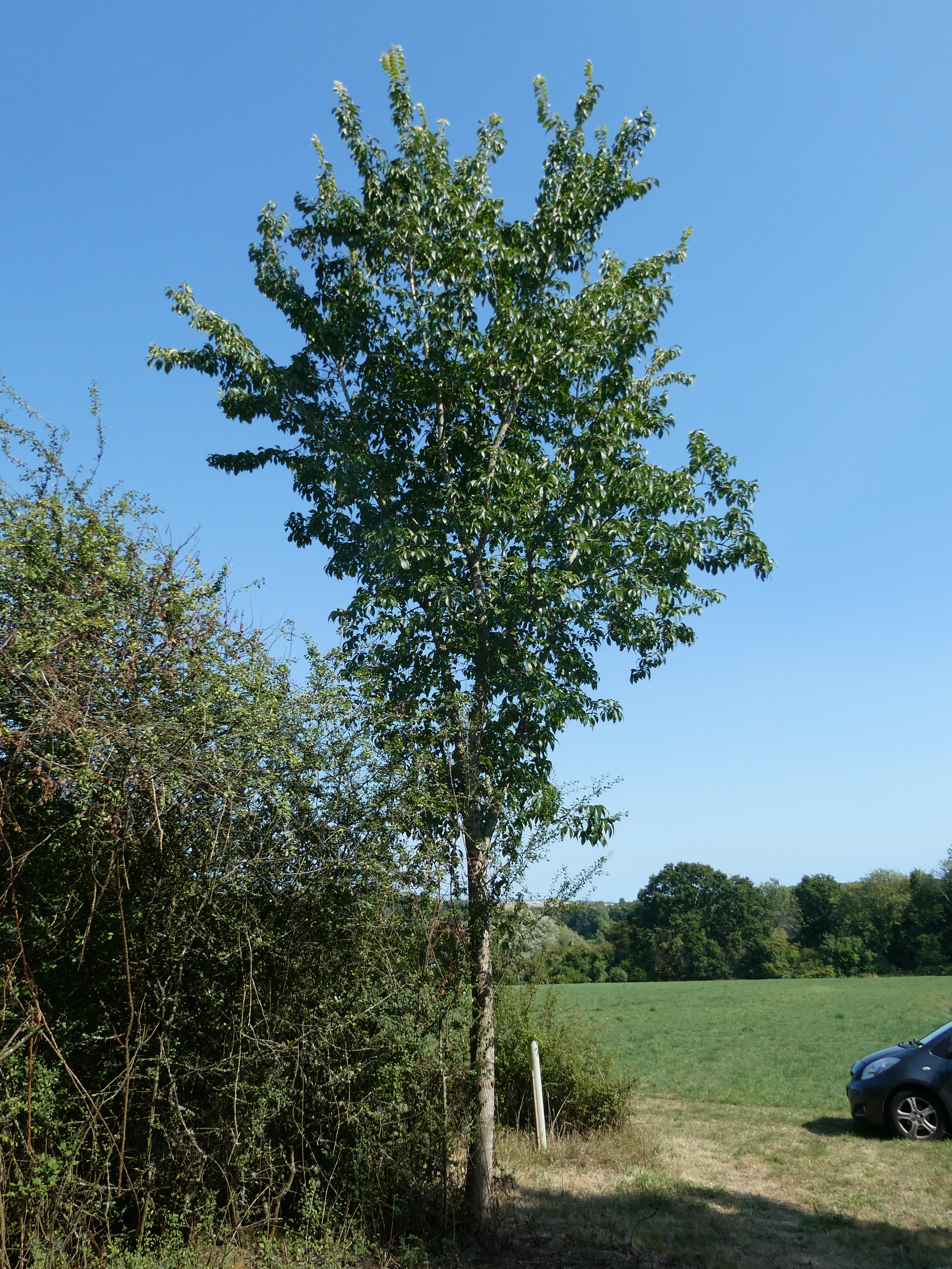
'Phantasos', Great Fontley, UK

A sibling of 'Morfeo' was also tested (as 'FL506') by IPP and found to have almost as high a resistance to DED (8.1% defoliation). The tree differed markedly in appearance however, its structure and foliage resembling wych elm Ulmus glabra. Though tentatively named 'Phantasos' (brother of Morpheus), it was never patented or released to commerce. A number were introduced by Hampshire & Isle of Wight Branch, Butterfly Conservation, in 2006 and planted at Great Fontley and Stansted Park, where several suffered stem splitting occasioned by the development of heavy lower branches of a thickness almost equal to the stem. Such branches pruned early to a height of 2m have created trees with a single stem of timber potential. Herling opined the tree could make a worthy successor to the wych elm in woodlands.

== Etymology ==
The cultivar is named for Morfeo (English: Morpheus), the Roman god of dreams to whom the elm was sacred. There was an elm in Morpheus' domain, upon which hung the dreams fashioned by the Oneiroi. From the Aeneid by Virgil, translated by Dryden:

Full in the midst of this infernal road,

An elm displays her dusky arms abroad:

The God of Sleep there hides his heavy head,

And empty dreams on ev'ry leaf are spread.

== Accessions ==
Europe

- Grange Farm Arboretum , Lincs., UK. Acc. no. 822.
- Great Fontley Farm, Fareham, UK. Butterfly Conservation One tree, Elm Trials plantation, Home Field.
- Icomb Place, UK. Three plants donated by IPP in 2011
- Royal Botanic Garden Edinburgh, UK. Acc. no. 20110002
- Sir Harold Hillier Gardens, UK. One tree in Plant Centre Field. Acc. no. 2007.0258.

=== North America ===
- National Arboretum, Washington, D.C., US. Two trees.
