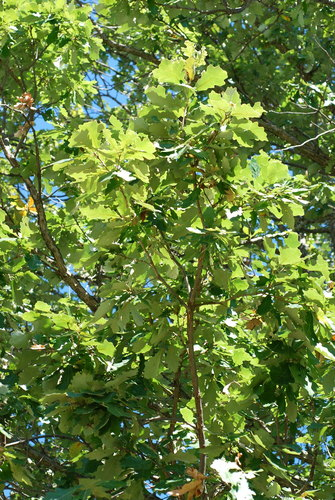

Scientific classification
- Kingdom: Plantae
- Clade: Embryophytes
- Clade: Tracheophytes
- Clade: Spermatophytes
- Clade: Angiosperms
- Clade: Eudicots
- Clade: Rosids
- Order: Fagales
- Family: Fagaceae
- Genus: Quercus
- Subgenus: Quercus subg. Quercus
- Section: Quercus sect. Quercus
- Species: Q. × schuettei

Binomial name
- Quercus × schuettei Trel.

= Quercus × schuettei =

Hybrid species of flowering plant

Quercus × schuettei (or Quercus schuettei), known as Schuette's oak, is a hybrid species of white oak native to the Canadian provinces of Ontario and Quebec, and the US states of Illinois, Indiana, Iowa, Kentucky, Michigan, Minnesota, Missouri, New York, Ohio, Oklahoma, Vermont, and Wisconsin. It is a naturally occurring hybrid of swamp white oak (Quercus bicolor) and burr oak (Quercus macrocarpa), found where their ranges overlap. Its parents are both placed in Quercus sect. Quercus.

Quercus × schuettei is a tree reaching 50–70 ft (15–21 m) with a conical growth form, typically found in wet areas such as riverbanks. Available from commercial nurseries, it is planted as a landscaping or street tree, and is particularly suited for rain gardens. It tolerates clay soils and erosion and is relatively pest resistant. Schuette's oak produces abundant acorns which are relished by wildlife. The fall foliage turns yellowish-brown.
