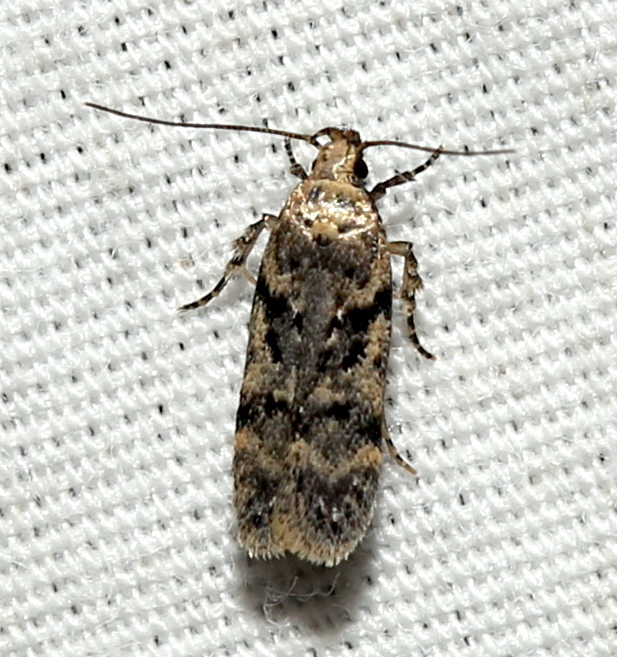

Scientific classification
- Kingdom: Animalia
- Phylum: Arthropoda
- Clade: Pancrustacea
- Class: Insecta
- Order: Lepidoptera
- Family: Gelechiidae
- Genus: Chionodes
- Species: C. thoraceochrella

Binomial name
- Chionodes thoraceochrella (Chambers, 1872)

Synonyms
- Gelechia thoraceochrella Chambers, 1872; Gelechia nigrimaculella Busck, 1903

= Chionodes thoraceochrella =

Species of moth

Chionodes thoraceochrella is a moth in the family Gelechiidae. It is found in North America, where it has been recorded from Nova Scotia and southern Quebec to Georgia, North Dakota, Mississippi, Texas and Washington, east to California, Utah and Arizona.

The wingspan is 13–15 mm. The forewings are whitish fuscous but obscured by a sprinkling of dark-brown and black scales. An ill-defined longitudinal streak below the costal edge is whitish and the costal edge is nearly black. There is an oblique short black dash on the middle of the disc, and just below this a similar one. An obscure outwardly angulated narrow white fascia is found at the apical third, and just before this is a costal and a dorsal blackish spot nearly reaching each other. The hindwings are light fuscous, darker toward tip.

The larvae feed on Quercus alba, Quercus bicolor, Quercus rubra and Prunus virginiana.
