= Ulmus chenmoui 'JAB Morton' =

Elm cultivar

- Species: Ulmus chenmoui
- Cultivar: 'JAB Morton' = Summer Elixir
- Origin: US

The Langya Mountain Elm (Note: Not yet published (2025): a photograph of the cultivar's fruit and one of the bark of the original specimen.) cultivar Ulmus chenmoui 'JAB Morton' (sold as Summer Elixir) was selected by nurseryman Jim Barborinas at Urban Forest Nursery, Mount Vernon, Washington, from seedlings sourced from Dr. George Ware of Morton Arboretum, and released in 2003 by J.F. Schmidt & Co. of Boring, Oregon. The variety is notable for its resistance to Dutch elm disease, its red-tinged fall colour (rare in elms where yellow is the norm), and its hardiness (USDA Zone 5). It was the first putative U. chenmoui commercial cultivar to be introduced in the West.

Not to be confused with Ulmus 'Morton'.

== Description ==
Summer Elixir is a small to medium-sized tree notable for its early fast growth, when it is vase-shaped, but smaller maturing size, when it becomes more rounded in shape, growing to 35 ft tall by 30 ft wide. Its spring leaves are flushed with pink or red before turning green in summer. Fall leaves are yellow tinged with rusty-red. The fissured, shaggy bark is a feature of the species.

== Pests and diseases ==
Resistant to Dutch Elm disease and elm leaf beetle.

== Cultivation ==
The cultivar, in nurseries in the northwest US, was planted in two US arboreta in 2022 (see 'Accessions').

== Etymology ==
The cultivar name 'JAB Morton' combines the nurseryman's initials with the source arboretum.

== Accessions ==
- Dawes Arboretum, Newark, Ohio, US. 1 tree, accession number D2022-0031.001, planted 2022.
- J.C. Raulston Arboretum, North Carolina State University, Raleigh, North Carolina, US. 1 tree, accession number 220426, planted 2022.

== Nurseries ==
North America

- Northwest Shade Trees (J. Frank Schmidt & Son Co), Salem, Oregon
- Job's Nursery, Pasco, Washington
- Urban Forest Nursery, Mount Vernon, Washington
