= Eugene Byron Smalley =

University of Wisconsin-Madison researcher into Dutch Elm disease

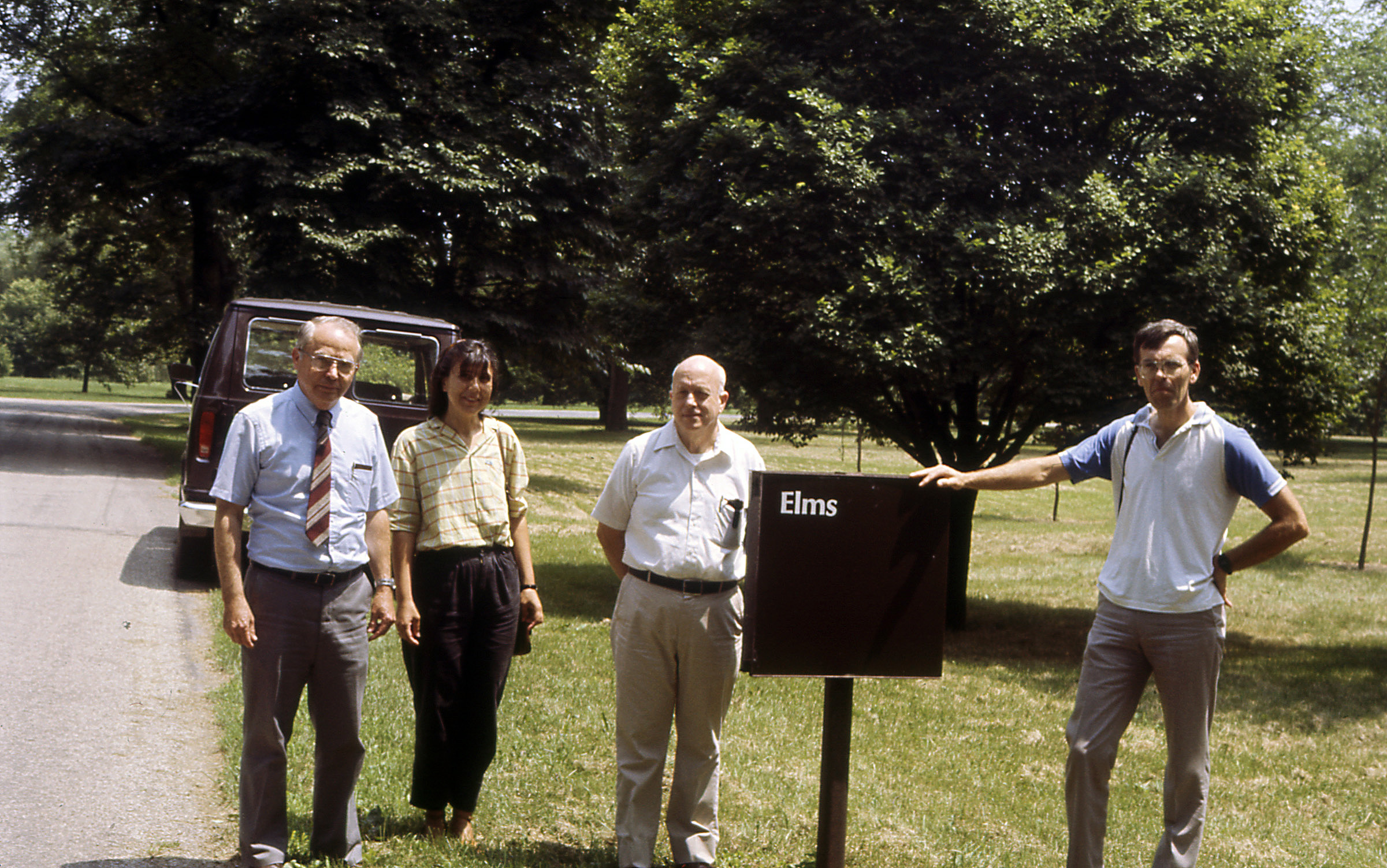
Elms field in Morton arboretum and elm breeders, from left: George Ware, Mrs. Vera Grbić, Smalley and Ray Guries (July 2, 1987)

Professor Eugene Byron Smalley (1926–2002) was an American plant pathologist. Smalley joined the University of Wisconsin-Madison in 1957 with the specific aim of finding a way to control Dutch elm disease Assembling seeds from around the northern hemisphere, Smalley developed resistant strains of elms which were patented and released to commerce, notably 'Sapporo Autumn Gold', and 'New Horizon'.

== Publications ==
- Chen, M. M.; Smalley, E. B.; Guries, R. P. (1984). "Disease resistance screening of selected elm species and cultivars". Phytopathology. 74: 824.
- Lester, D. T.; Smalley, E. B. (1972). "Response of backcross hybrids and 3 species combinations of Ulmus pumila, Ulmus japonica, and Ulmus rubra to inoculation with Ceratocystis ulmi". Phytopathology. 62 (8): 845–848. doi:10.1094/Phyto-62-845.
- Lester, D. T; Smalley, E. B. (1972). "Response of Ulmus pumila and Ulmus pumila-rubra hybrids to inoculation with Ceratocystis ulmi". Phytopathology. 62 (8): 848–852. doi:10.1094/Phyto-62-848.
- Lester, D. T; Smalley, E. B. (1972). "Variation in ornamental traits and disease-resistance among crosses of Ulmus pumila, Ulmus rubra and putative natural hybrids". Silvae Genetica. 21: 193–197.
- Smalley, E. B. (1963). "Seasonal fluctuations in susceptibility of young elm seedlings to Dutch elm disease". Phytopathology. 53: 846–853.
- Smalley, E. B.; Guries, R. P. (1993). "Breeding Elms for Resistance to Dutch Elm Disease". Annual Review of Phytopathology. 31: 325–354. doi:10.1146/annurev.phyto.31.1.325.
- Smalley, E. B.; Lester, D. T. (1973). "'Sapporo Autumn Gold' Elm". HortScience. 8 (514–515): 1973.
- Smalley, E. B.; Lester, D.T. (1983). "'Regal' Elm". HortScience. 18 (960–961): 1983.
