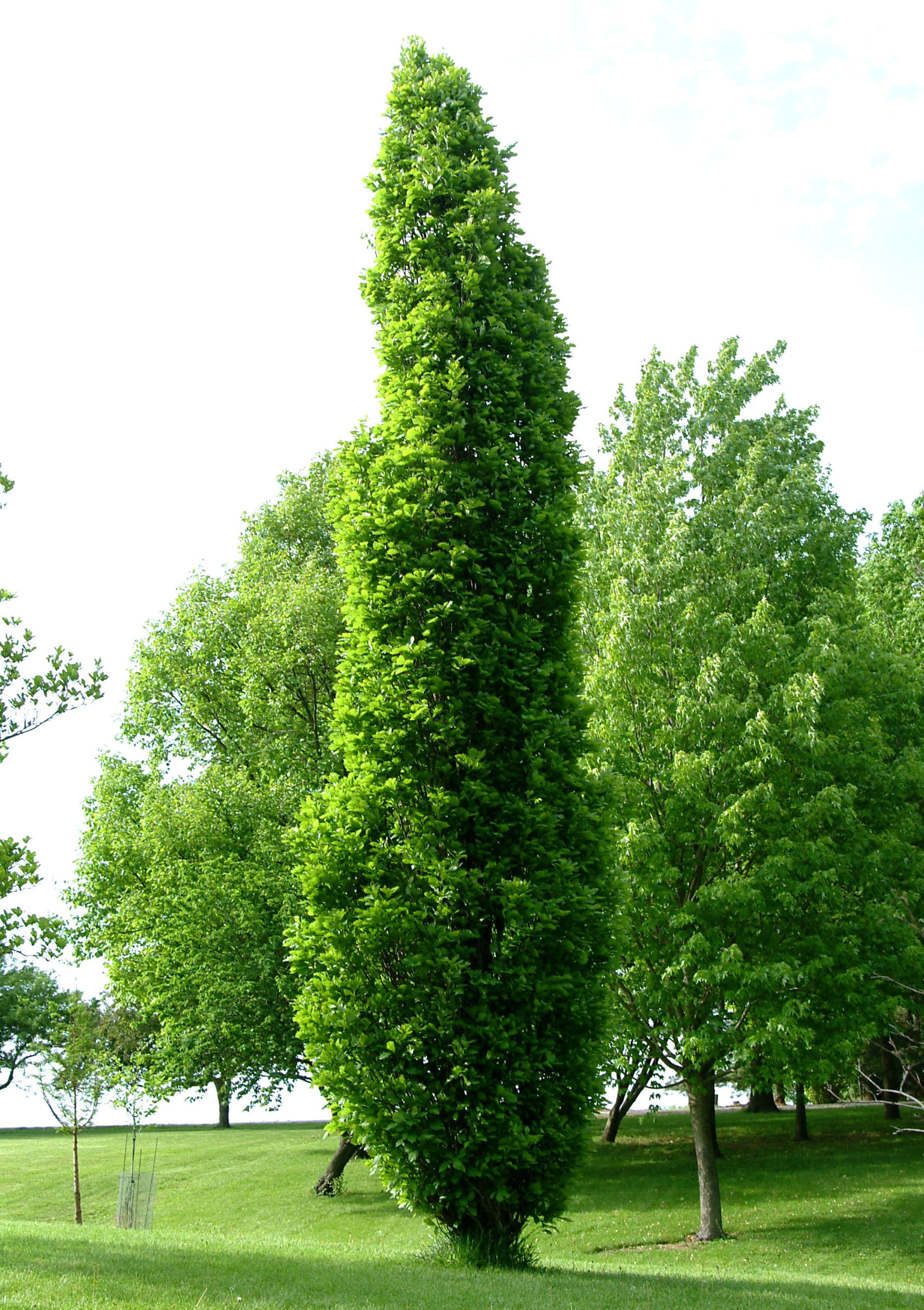
- Quercus × warei 'Nadler' = Kindred Spirit

Scientific classification
- Kingdom: Plantae
- Clade: Tracheophytes
- Clade: Angiosperms
- Clade: Eudicots
- Clade: Rosids
- Order: Fagales
- Family: Fagaceae
- Genus: Quercus
- Subgenus: Quercus subg. Quercus
- Section: Quercus sect. Quercus
- Species: Q. × warei

Binomial name
- Quercus × warei T.L.Green & W.J.Hess

= Quercus × warei =

Quercus × warei is a hybrid oak tree in the genus Quercus. The tree is a hybrid of Quercus robur f. fastigiata (upright English oak) and Quercus bicolor (swamp white oak). The hybrid is named for the American dendrologist George Ware, former Research Director at the Morton Arboretum in Illinois.

== Cultivars ==
Two cultivars, 'Long' and 'Nadler' were patented. 'Nadler' was patented and trademarked in 2007. The mother tree of both cultivars is a Quercus robur f. fastigiata (upright English oak, a narrow form) growing in Columbia, Missouri. The ortet of 'Nadler' is growing in Jacksonville, Illinois. Approximately 1000 seeds were collected from the mother plant in 1974 and propagated, with two selected for further development as cultivars, which are now propagated clonally.

The 'Long' cultivar is marketed under the trade designation Regal Prince, and the 'Nadler' cultivar under the trade designation Kindred Spirit. 'Nadler' oaks are 11 m (35 ft) tall with a limb spread of 2 m (6 ft) at an age of 30 years. 'Nadler' and 'Long' are highly resistant to powdery mildew, which plagues the Q. robur parent. This clone also exhibits heterosis (hybrid vigor).

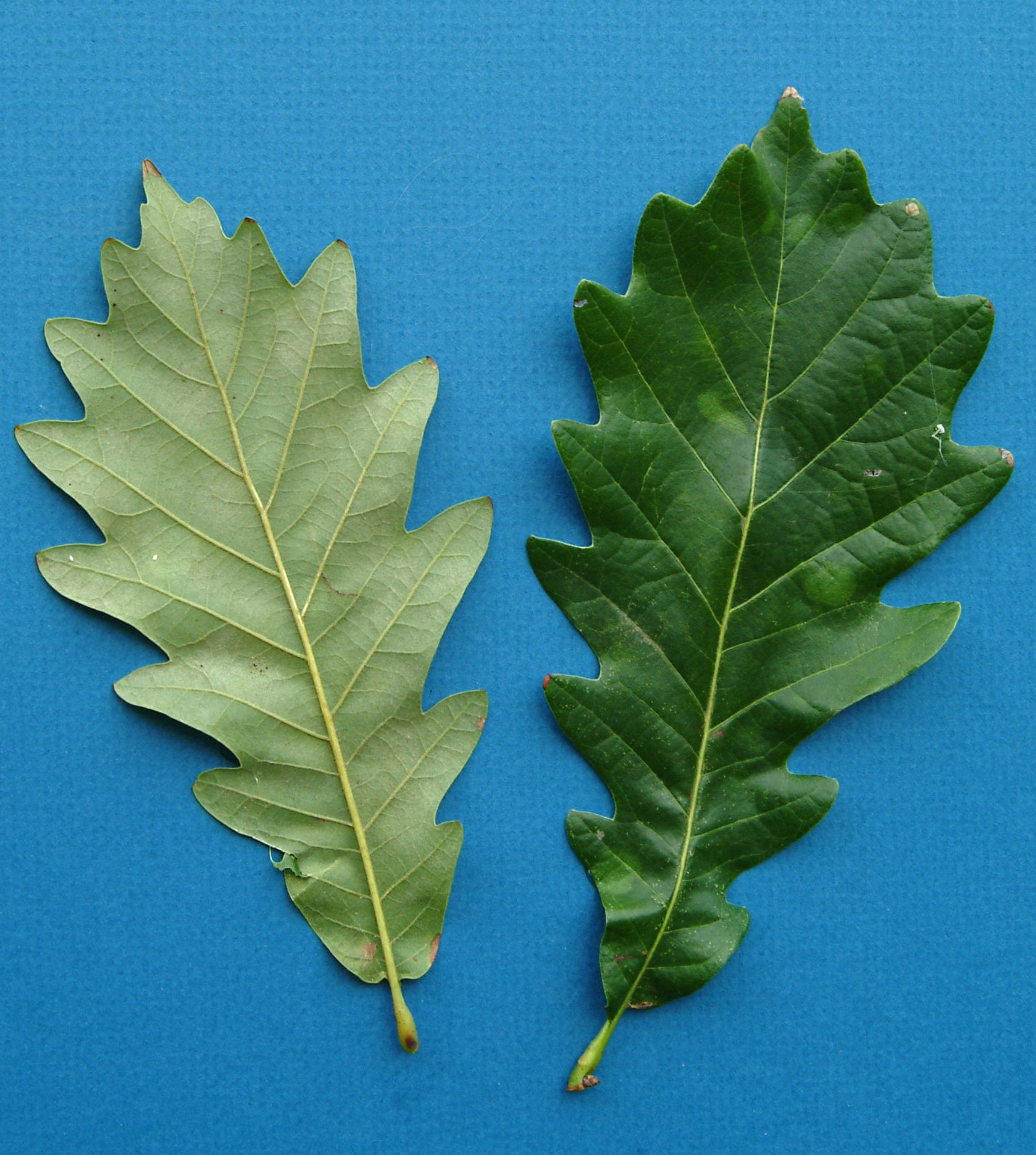
Leaves of a 'Nadler' cultivar

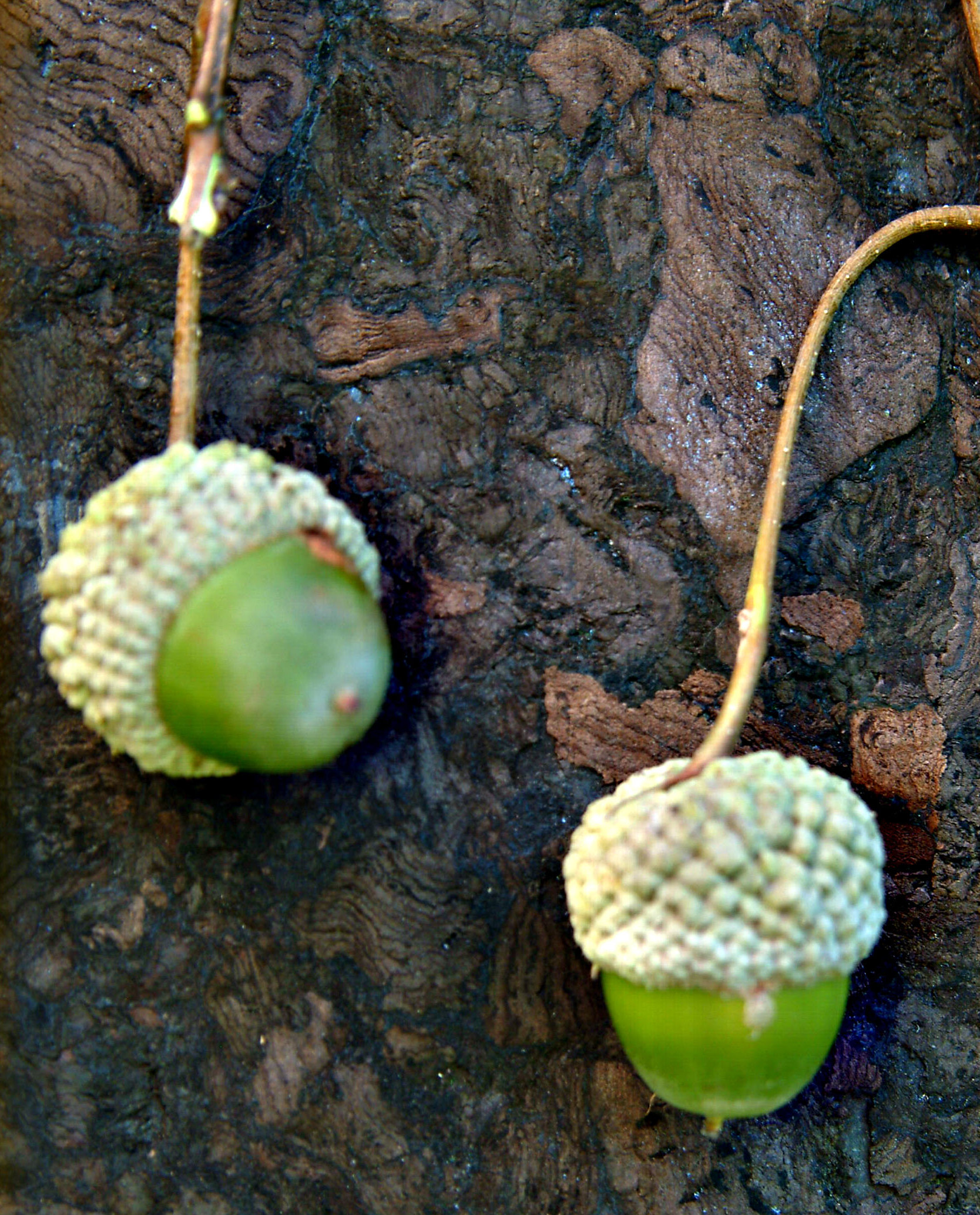
Immature acorns of a 'Nadler' cultivar

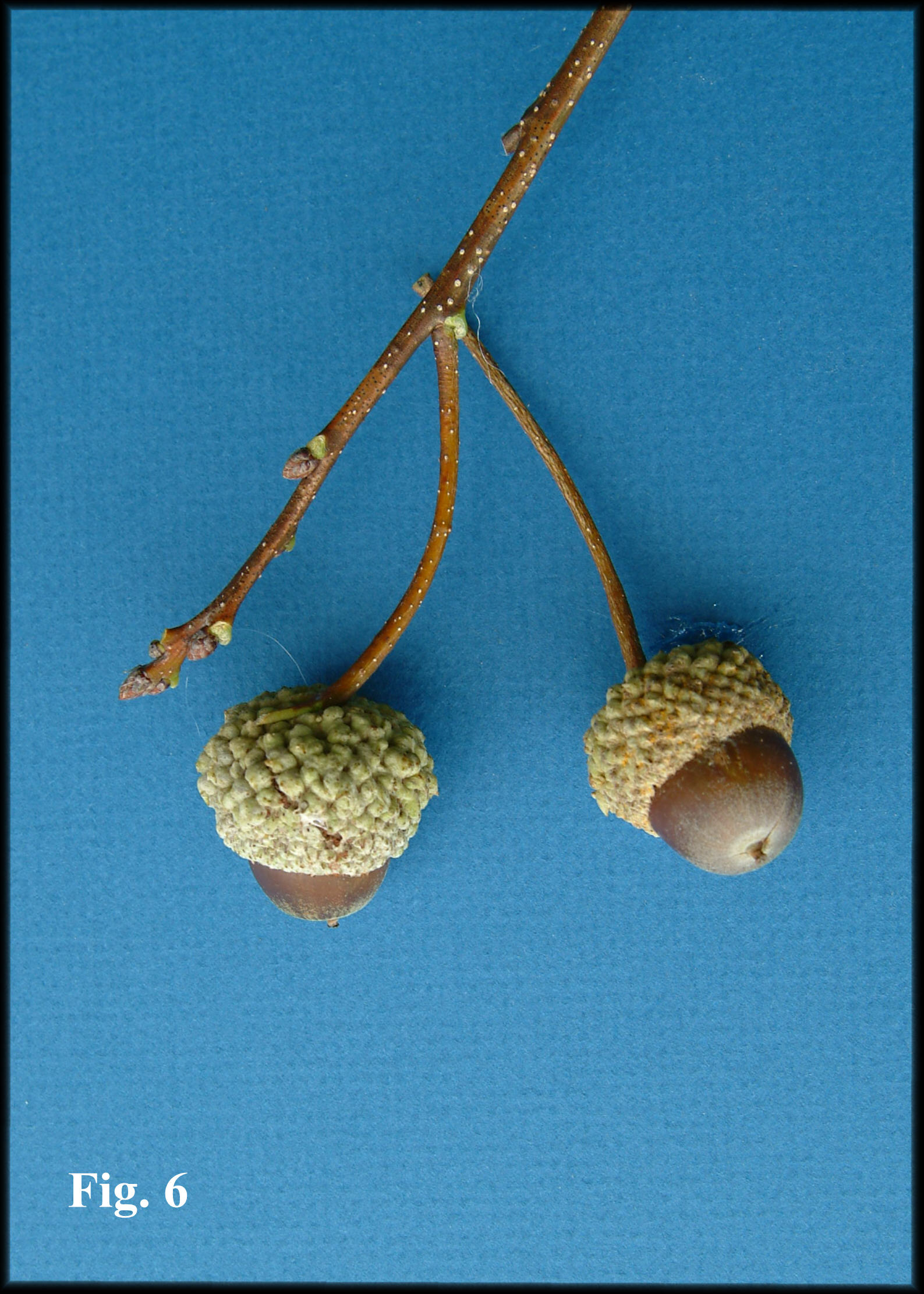
Acorns of a 'Nadler' cultivar

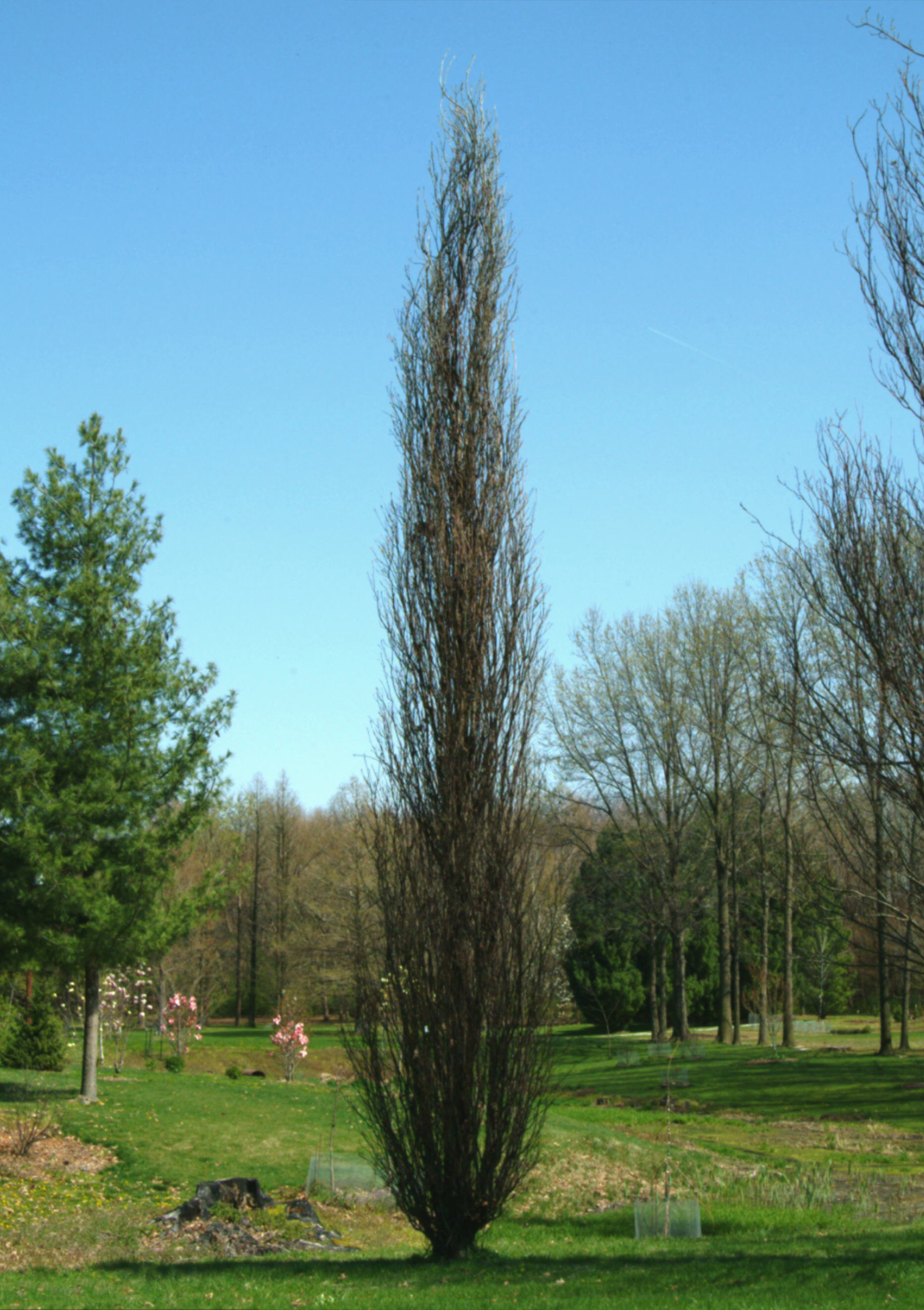
'Nadler' cultivar without leaves

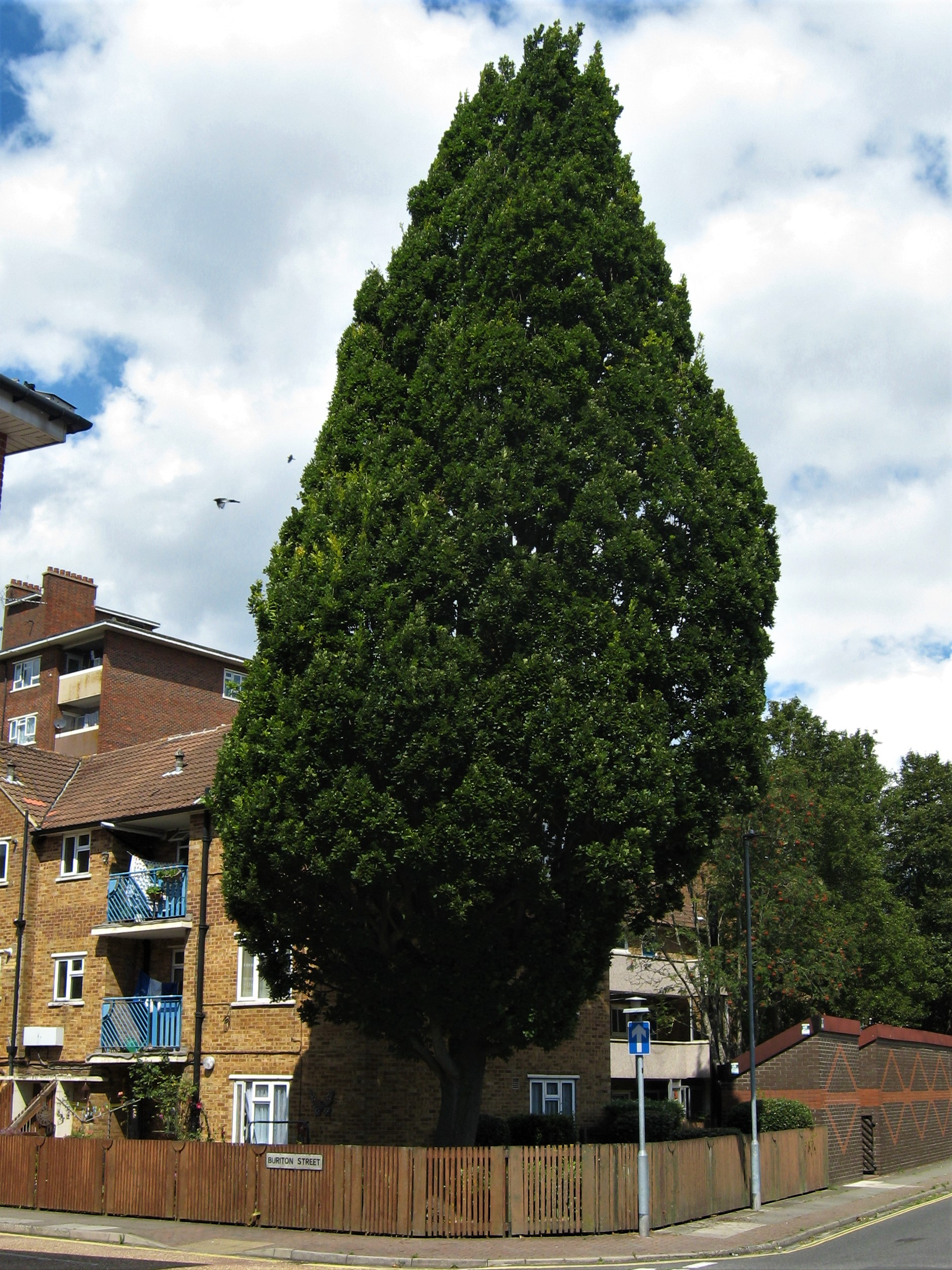
In Portsmouth, UK
