= Ulmus × hollandica 'Groeneveld' =

Elm cultivar

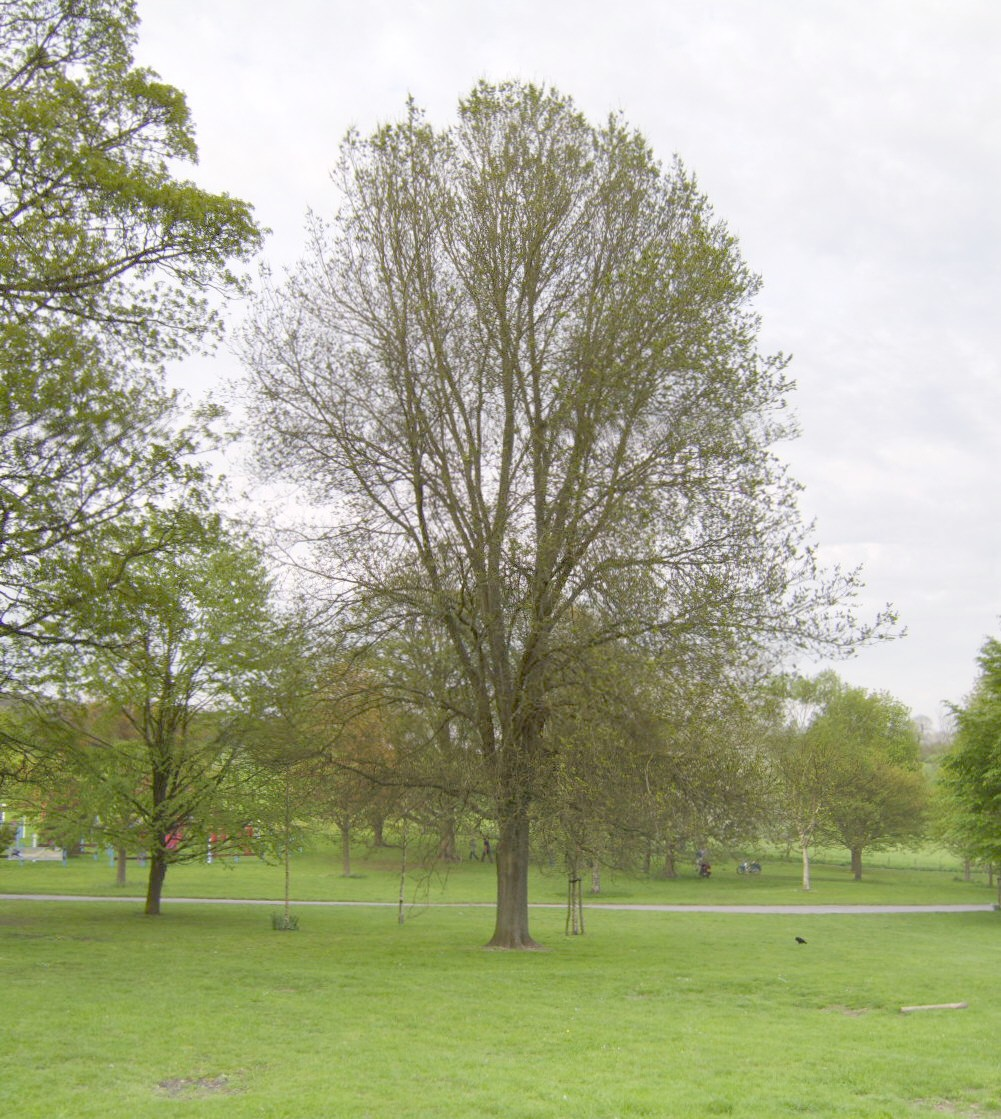
- 'Groeneveld' Stanmer Park, Brighton, UK
- Hybrid parentage: U. × hollandica × U. minor
- Cultivar: 'Groeneveld'
- Origin: Netherlands

The Dutch hybrid elm cultivar Ulmus × hollandica 'Groeneveld' was cloned in 1949 at the De Dorschkamp Institute, Wageningen, and released in 1963 in response to the earlier, less virulent form of Dutch elm disease that afflicted Europe shortly after the First World War. The cultivar was derived from a crossing of Dutch clones '49', (originally believed to be an English Wych Elm Ulmus glabra but later identified as another example of Ulmus × hollandica) and '1', a Field Elm Ulmus minor found in central France and marketed by the Barbier nursery in Orléans.

== Description ==
The tree is slow growing, and produces a dense, upswept crown which initially made it popular as a street tree in the Netherlands. The dark-green obovate leaves are < 9 cm long by 4 cm broad, arranged in clusters on short branchlets. The seed is close to the notch of the samara.

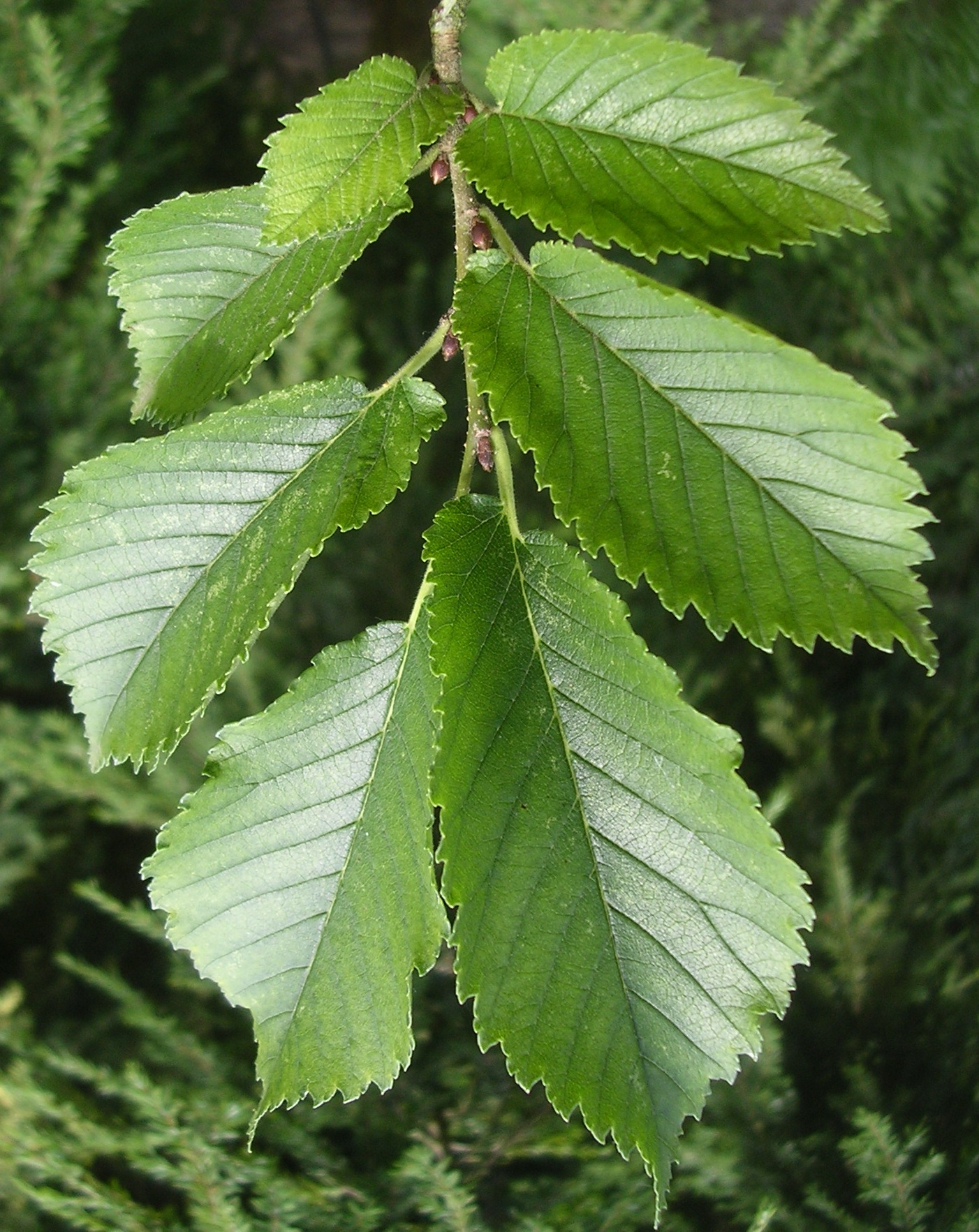
'Groeneveld' leaves

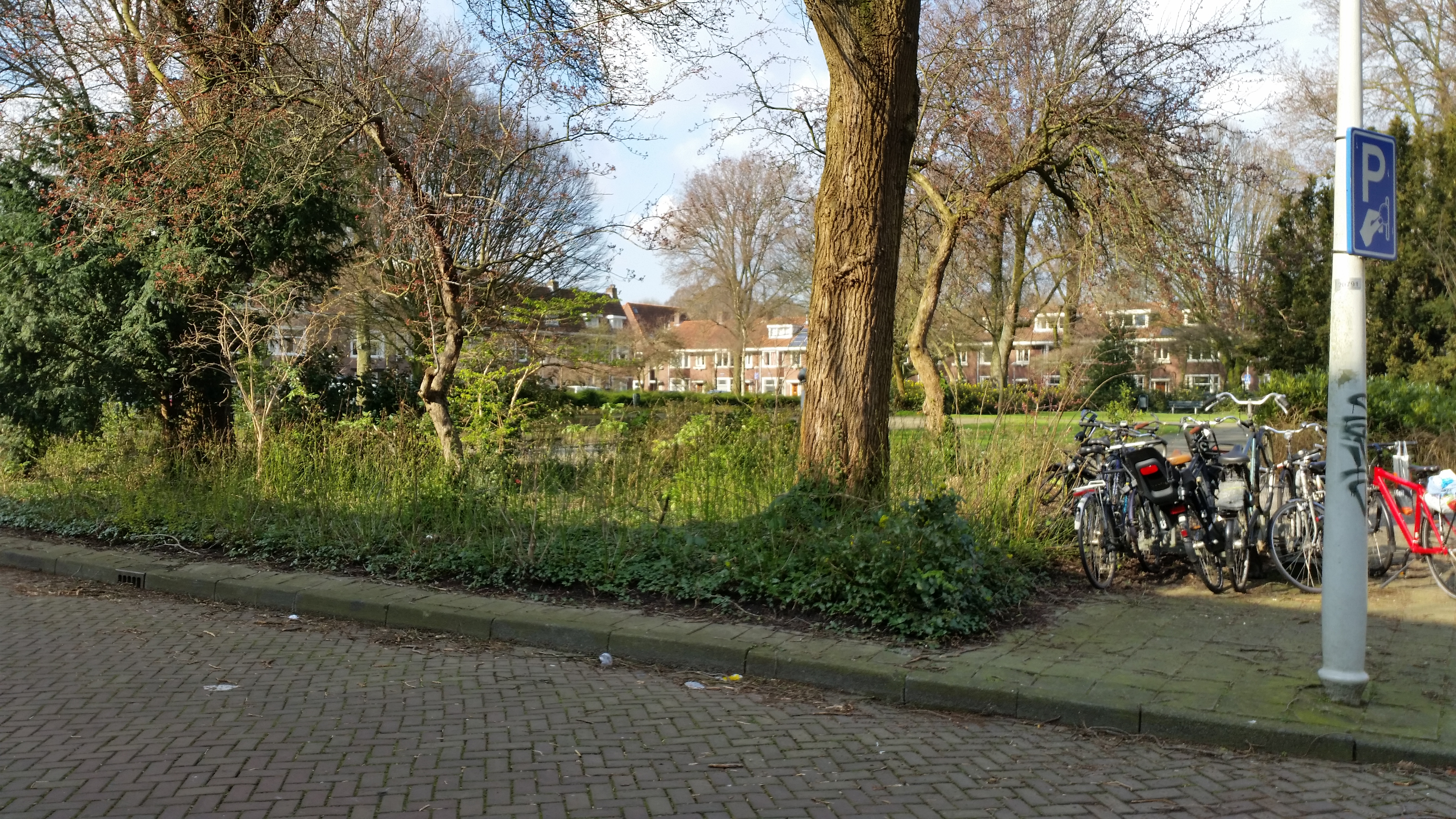
'Groeneveld' bark

== Pests and diseases ==
'Groeneveld' has good resistance to Coral-spot fungus Nectria cinnabarina, and black spot. However, like all the other Dutch hybrids released before 1989, it proved to have only marginal resistance, rated 3 out of 5 to the later, virulent form of Dutch elm disease and consequently planting is no longer recommended where the disease is prevalent.

== Cultivation ==
A number of old 'Groeneveld' stand in the Voltaplein, Amsterdam, while trees planted in the mid 1980s line the Zuidsingel, Kortenhoef, Wijdemeren. More recent plantings include ten in ‘s-Gravelandsevaartweg, Loosdrecht, and nine in Nedervecht, Nederhorst den Berg (planted 2018), and a number in Strandje Wijde Blik, Kortenhoef (2019). 'Groeneveld' was also introduced elsewhere in Europe, including Britain, in small numbers. The tree was briefly propagated and marketed in the UK by the Hillier & Sons nursery, Winchester, Hampshire from 1975 to 1977, during which time 29 were sold. The tree was planted in trials in Canberra, Australia started in 1988, but has not shown promise in that environment so far; it has however proved popular in New Zealand. There are several specimens in American arboreta (see under Accessions).

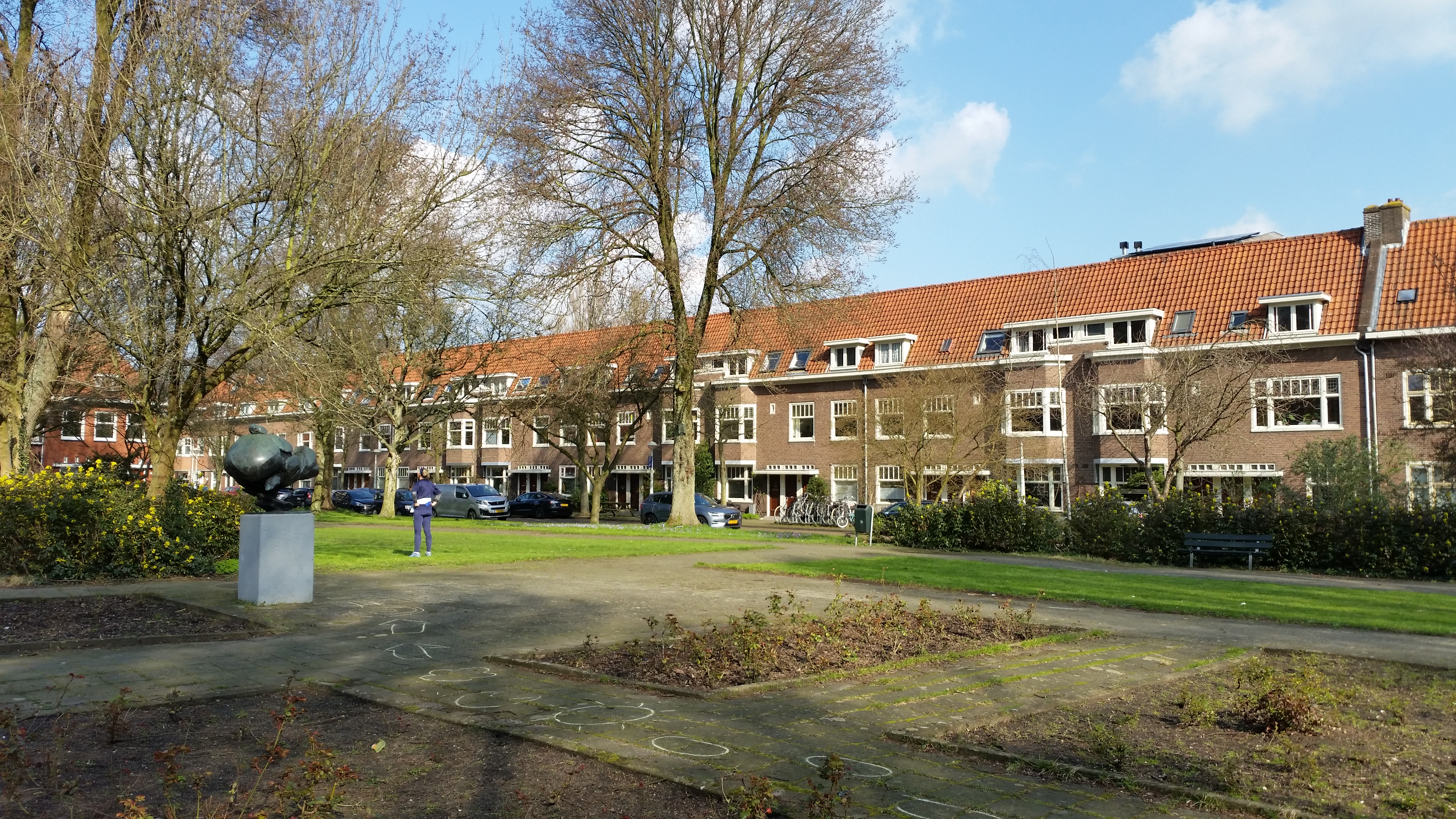
'Groeneveld' (centre), Voltaplein, Amsterdam (2020)

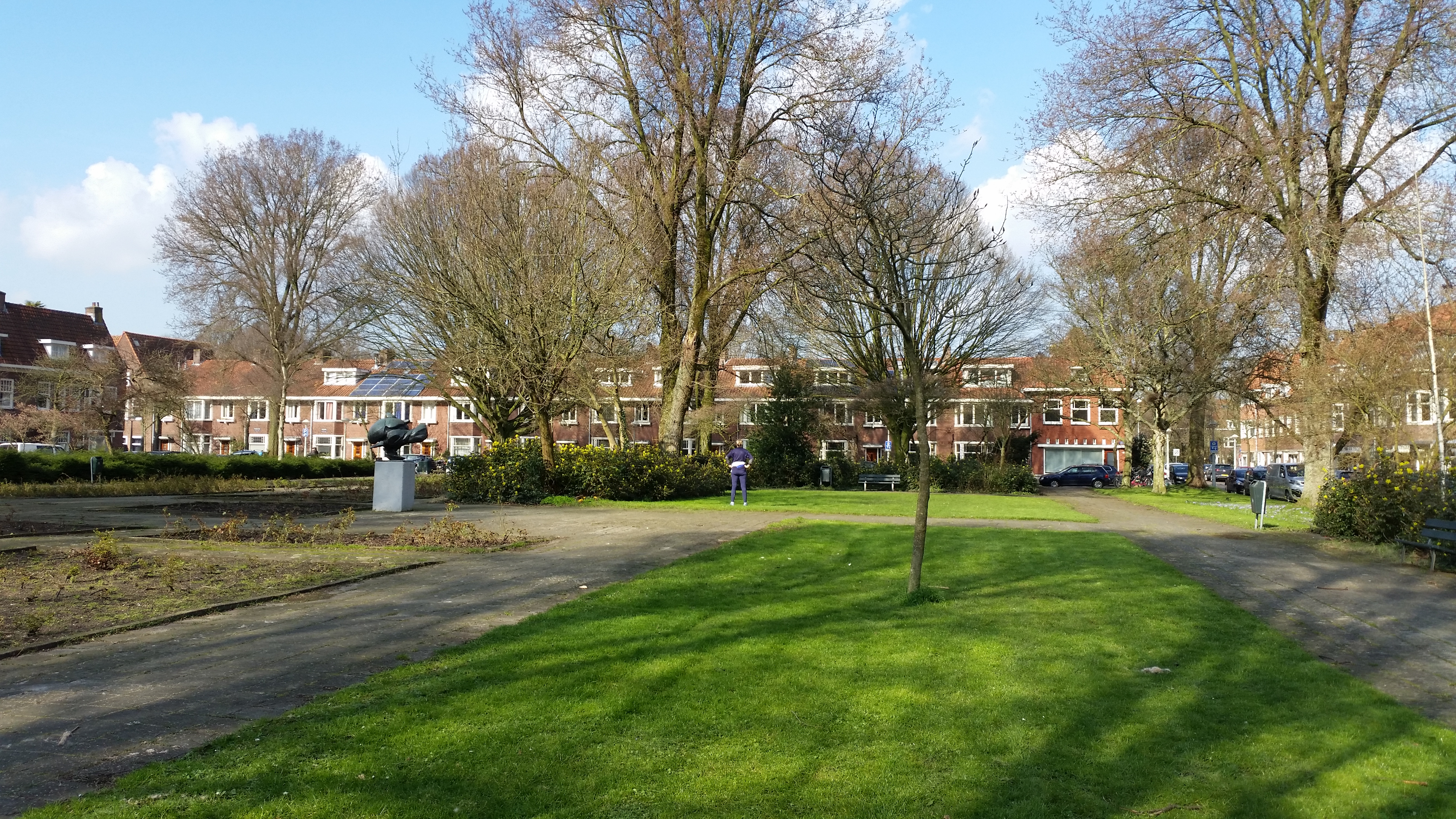
'Groeneveld', Voltaplein, Amsterdam

== Notable trees ==
The TROBI Champion tree in the UK is at Stanmer Park, near Brighton, East Sussex, measuring 18 m high by 53 cm d.b.h. in 2002 An elm in West Park, Wolverhampton, listed in 2017 by the TROBI as the UK champion 'Plantyn', was found on re-examination in 2025 to be an old 'Groeneveld'. It measured 20.5 m tall by 75 cm d.b.h. in 2017.

== Etymology ==
'Groeneveld' translates as 'green field', and was named for the eponymous de Dorschkamp trial site at Wageningen.

== Hybrid cultivars ==
- FL 522: derived from a crossing with the Chinese species Ulmus chenmoui by the Istituto per la Protezione delle Piante in Florence; it has not been released to commerce.

== Accessions ==
=== North America ===
- Holden Arboretum, US. Acc. no. 70–127
- Morton Arboretum, US. Acc. no. 76–72, 29–2007 (graft).

=== Europe ===
- Brighton & Hove City Council, UK. NCCPG Elm Collection, UK champion: Stanmer Park, 18 m high, 53 cm d.b.h. in 2002.
- Grange Farm Arboretum , Sutton St. James, Spalding, Lincs., UK. Acc. no. 830.
- Royal Botanic Garden Wakehurst Place, UK. Acc. no. 1975–6125
- Sir Harold Hillier Gardens, Romsey, UK. Acc. no. 1977.6442

== Nurseries ==
=== Europe ===
- Bellwood Trees, Meigle, Perthshire, Scotland, UK.
- Boomkwekerij Ebben, Cuijk, Netherlands.
- De Reebock , Zwalm, Belgium.
- Westerveld Boomkwekerij, Opheusden, Netherlands.

=== Oceania ===
- Productive Trees Ltd., Paeroa, Waikato, New Zealand.
