= George Ware =

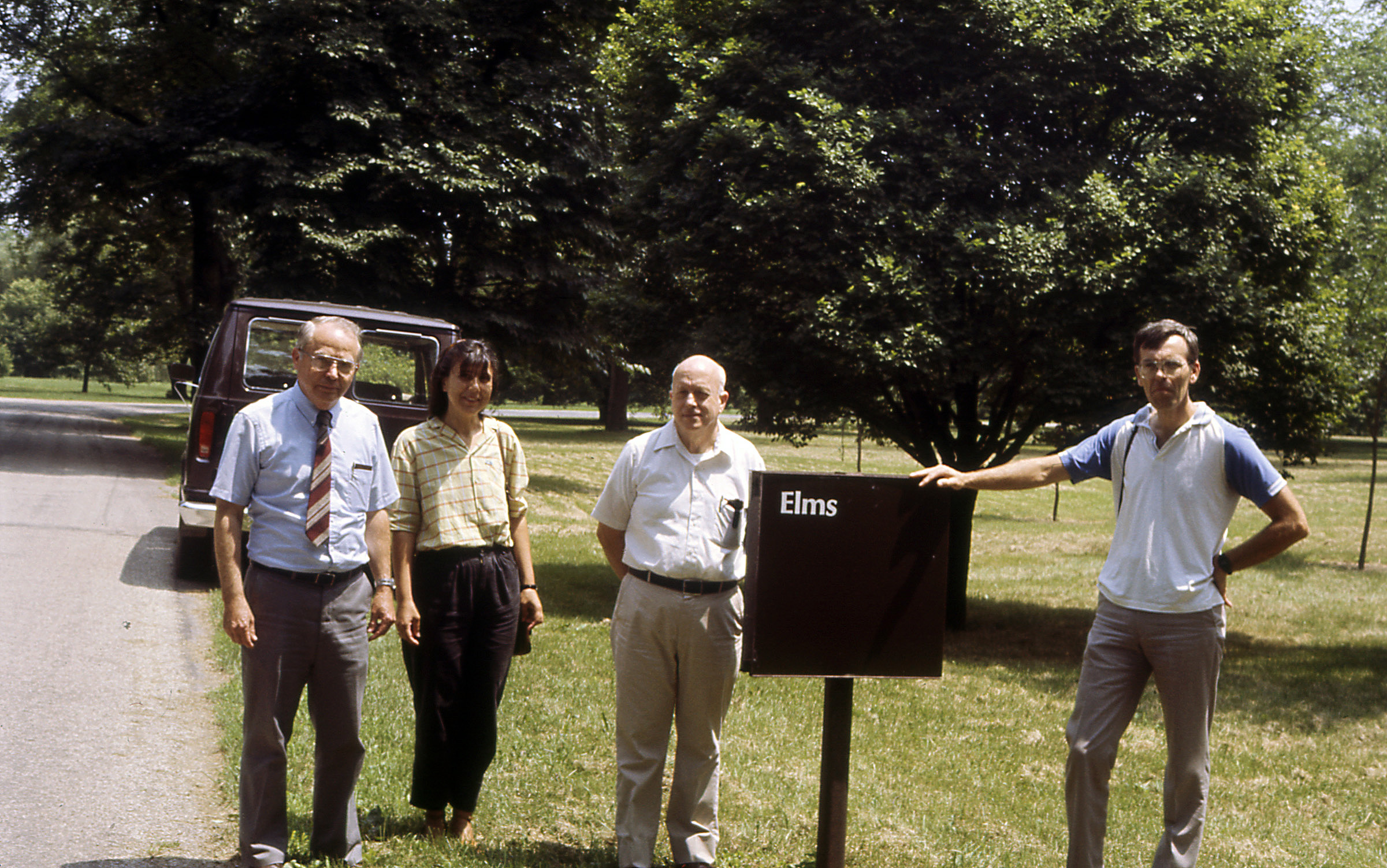
Elms field at the Morton Arboretum. From left of picture: George Ware, Mrs Vera Grbić, Eugene Smalley and Ray Guries (July 2, 1987)

George Ware, Ph.D. (1924–2010) was an American dendrologist and former research director of the Morton Arboretum Illinois who specialized in the evaluation of Asiatic species of elm as urban trees.

== Early life and education ==
Born 27 April 1924 in Avery, Oklahoma, the son of Charles & Mildred Ware, he was raised in Norman, Oklahoma, receiving BS and MS degrees from the University of Oklahoma, and a PhD in Forest Ecology from the University of Wisconsin - Madison.

== Career ==
Ware taught botany, ecology, dendrology and conservation at universities in Oklahoma and Louisiana, before joining the Morton Arboretum in 1968 as Dendrologist, becoming Research Director ten years later, a post he held until his retirement in 1995. During his career at the Morton he raised hybrid elms, maples, planes, poplars and mulberries. He also traveled extensively, making a total of five expeditions to China, and three to the former Soviet Union. Ware remained a Research Associate of the Morton Arboretum until 2009.

=== Elm research ===
Ware soon realized the potential of disease-resistant Asiatic elms as urban trees, leading a party of Morton botanists and horticulturists to northern China in 1990, followed by participation in the USDA-sponsored expedition to China in 1995. Through contacts established with the Chinese, Ware was to receive regular consignments of elm seed from 1990, which greatly enhanced the Morton Arboretum's elm collection.

== Personal life ==
Ware married, in 1955, June (née Gleason) (d. 2010), who bore him four sons.

== Death ==
George Ware died of complications arising from pancreatic cancer at Holy Cross Hospital in Chicago on 4 July 2010.

== Eponymy ==
The hybrid oak Quercus × warei (Quercus robur f. fastigiata × Quercus bicolor), commonly known as the 'Long Oak', was named for him.

== Honors and awards ==
- Gold Seal Award of the National Council of State Gardens (1994)
- American Foresters' Urban Forestry Research Awards (1997)
- Hutchinson Medal, Chicago Botanic Garden (1997)
- Norman J Colman Award, American Nursery and Landscape Association (1996)
- Award of Merit, Illinois Arborist Association (1996)
- Award of Merit, American Public Gardens Association (2001)
- Liberty Hyde Bailey Award, American Horticultural Association (2002)
- Conservation leadership Award, Openlands Association (2005)
- L C Chadwick Award for Arboricultural Research, International Society for Arboriculture (2008)

== Selected publications ==
- Ware, G. (1992). Elm breeding and improvement at the Morton Arboretum. Morton Arboretum Quarterly, 28(1): 1-5, 1992.
- Ware, G. (1995). Little-known elms from China: landscape tree possibilities. Journal of Arboriculture, (Nov. 1995). International Society of Arboriculture, Champaign, Illinois, US.
- Shirazi, A. M. & Ware, G. H. (2004). Evaluation of New Elms from China for Cold Hardiness in Northern Latitudes. International Symposium on Asian Plant Diversity & Systematics 2004, Sakura, Japan.
