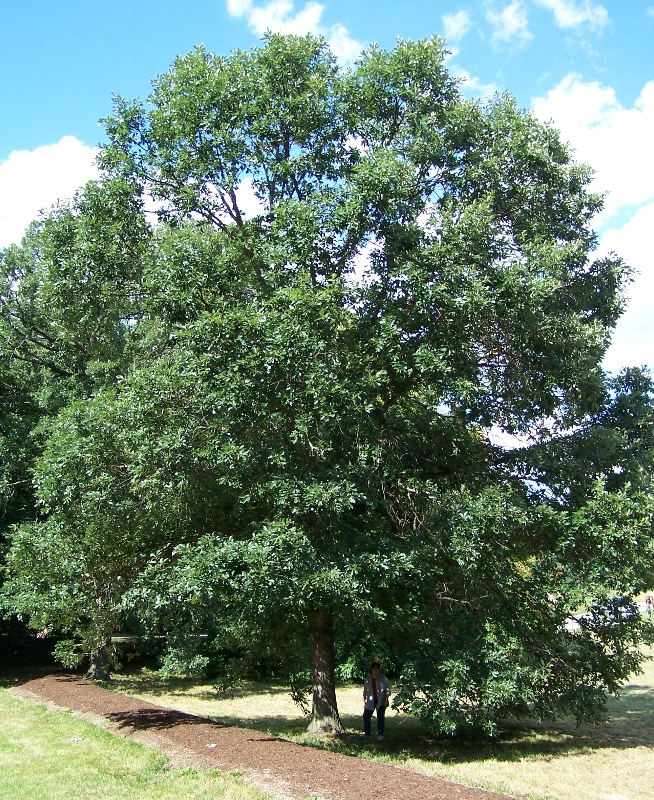
- Morton Arboretum acc. 71-69-2

Conservation status
- Least Concern (IUCN 3.1)

- Secure (NatureServe)

Scientific classification
- Kingdom: Plantae
- Clade: Embryophytes
- Clade: Tracheophytes
- Clade: Angiosperms
- Clade: Eudicots
- Clade: Rosids
- Order: Fagales
- Family: Fagaceae
- Genus: Quercus
- Subgenus: Quercus subg. Quercus
- Section: Quercus sect. Quercus
- Species: Q. bicolor

Binomial name
- Quercus bicolor Willd.
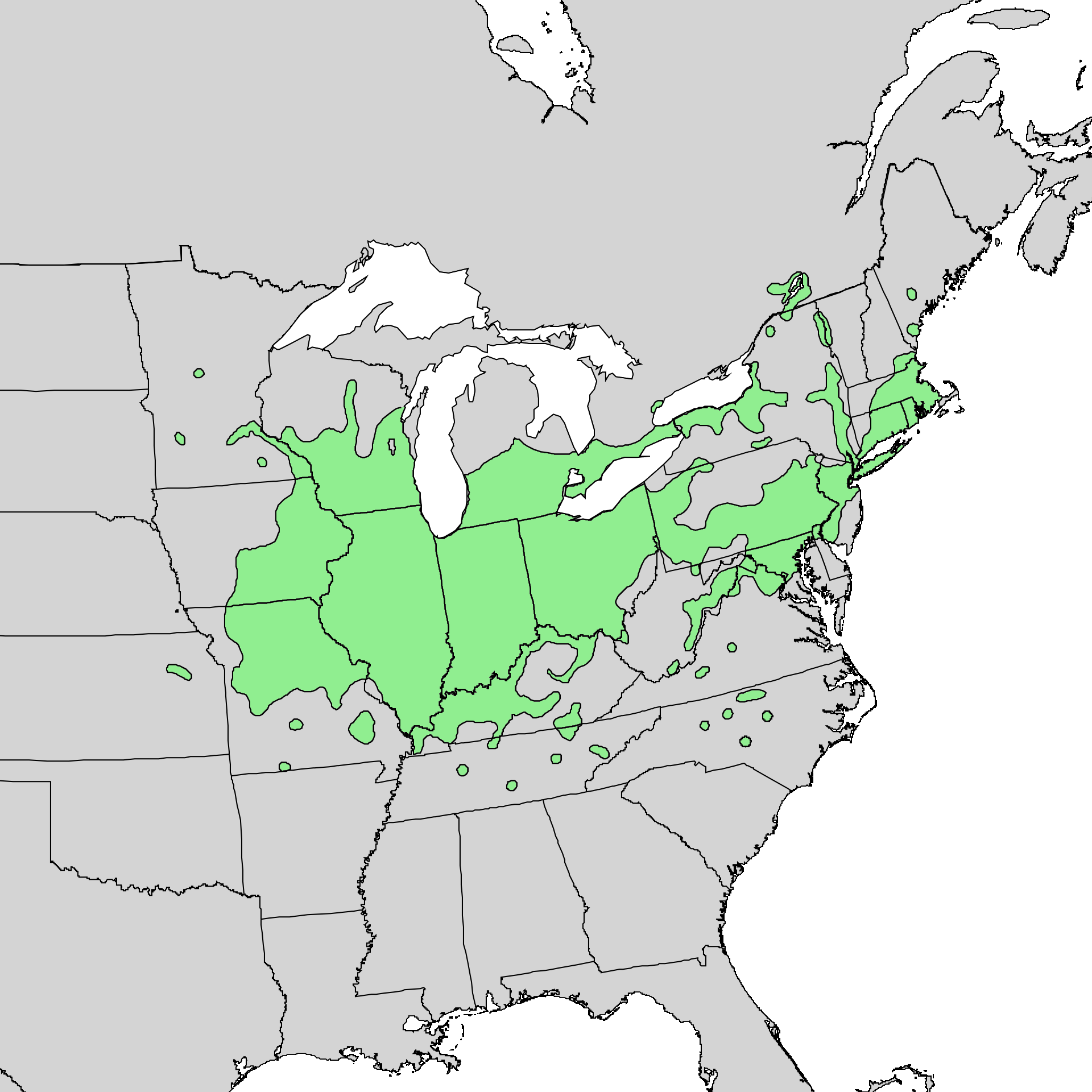
- Natural range in 1971

Synonyms
- List: Quercus bicolor var. angustifolia Dippel; Quercus bicolor var. cuneiformis Dippel; Quercus bicolor var. platanoides (Castigl.) A.DC; Quercus discolor var. bicolor (Willd.) Hampton; Quercus mollis Raf.; Quercus paludosa Petz. & G.Kirchn.; Quercus platanoides (Castigl) Sudworth; Quercus prinus var. bicolor (Willd.) Spach; Quercus prinus var. discolor F.Michx; Quercus prinus var. platanoides Castigl.; Quercus prinus var. tomentosa Michx.; Quercus filiformis Muhl. ex A.DC., not validly published; Quercus pannosa Bosc ex A.DC., not validly published; Quercus platanoides (Lam.) Sudw.; Quercus velutina L'Hér. ex A.DC.

= Quercus bicolor =

Swamp white oak

Species of oak tree

Quercus bicolor, the swamp white oak, is a North American species of medium-sized trees in the beech family. It is a common element of America's north central and northeastern mixed forests. It can survive in a variety of habitats. It forms hybrids with bur oak where they occur together in the wild.

== Description ==
Quercus bicolor grows rapidly and can reach 18 to 24 meters (60 to 80 feet) tall with the tallest known reaching 29 m (95 ft) and lives up to 285 years. The bark resembles that of the white oak. The leaves are broad ovoid, 12–18 centimetres (4 3/4–7 inches) long and 7–11 cm (2 3/4–4 1/4 in) broad, always more or less glaucous on the underside, and are shallowly lobed with five to seven lobes on each side, intermediate between the chestnut oak and the white oak. In autumn, they turn brown, yellow-brown, or sometimes reddish, but generally, the color is not as reliable or as brilliant as the white oak can be. The fruit is a peduncled acorn, 1.5–2 cm (5/8–3/4 in), rarely 2.5 cm (1 in), long and 1–2 cm (3/8–3/4 in) broad, maturing about six months after pollination. Good crops of swamp white oak occur every 3 to 5 years, with light crops during intervening years. The minimum seed-bearing age is 20 years, optimum age is 75 to 200 years, and maximum age is usually 300 years. Because the seed of swamp white oak is not dormant, it germinates soon after falling. Seed collections should be made soon after ripening in order to delay early germination. These acorns are difficult to store without germination or loss of viability occurring. Sound acorns have a germinative capacity between 78 and 98 percent. Gravity, rodents, and water are the primary dispersing agents (4,10).

Swamp white oak may live up to 300 years.

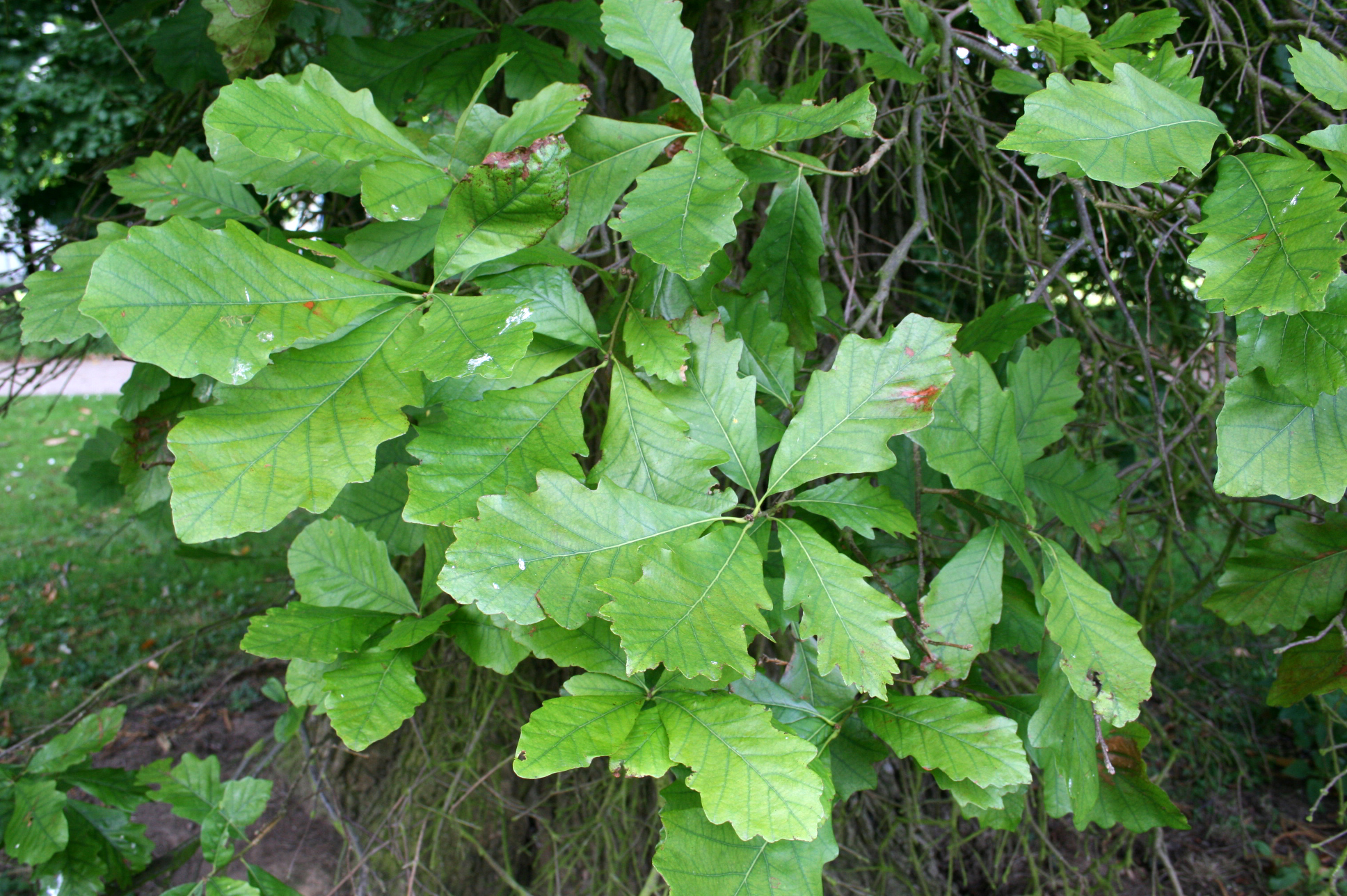
Leaves

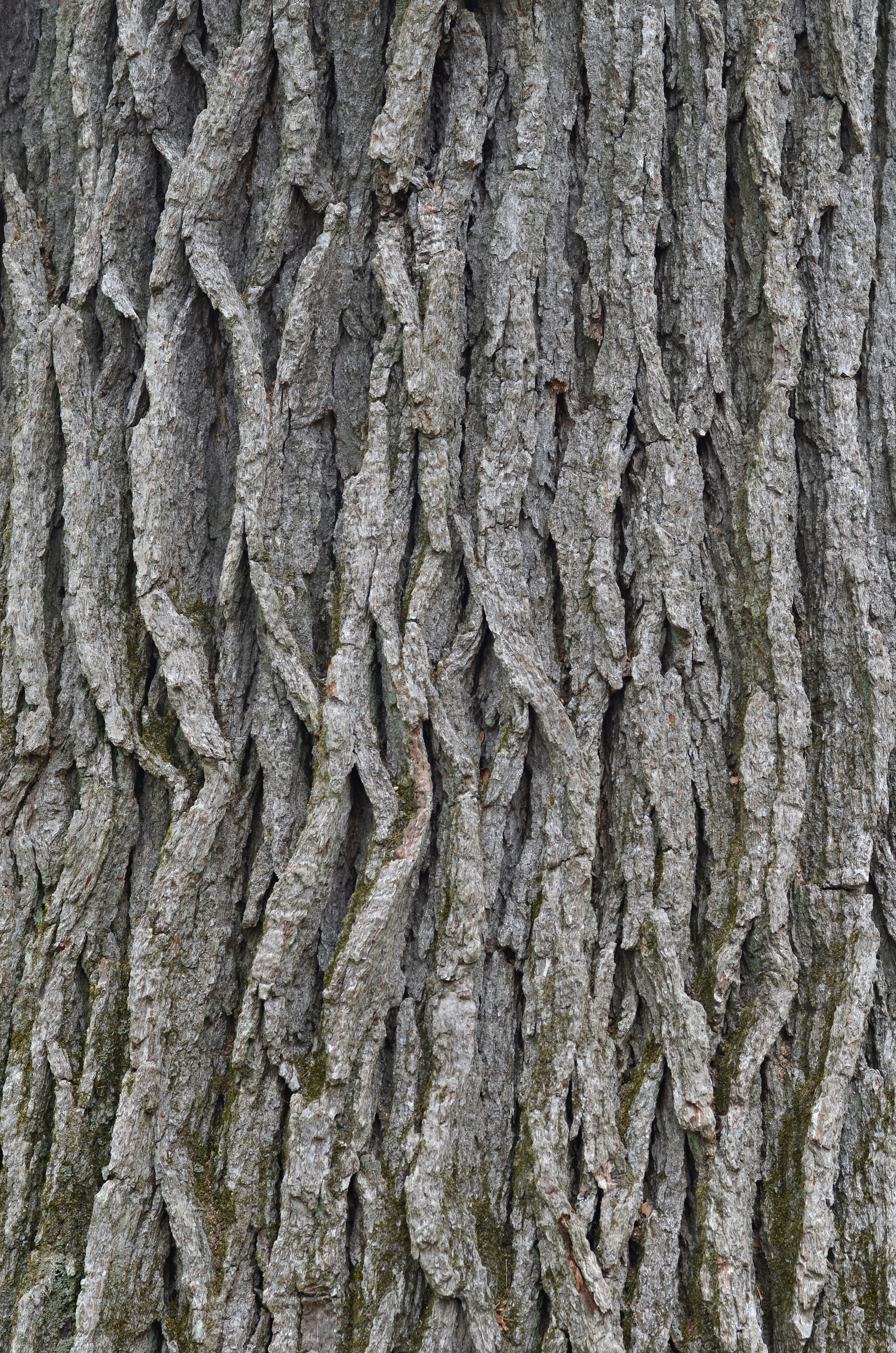
Bark

== Distribution and habitat ==
Swamp white oak, a lowland tree, occurs across the eastern and central United States and eastern and central Canada, from Maine to South Carolina, west as far as Ontario, Minnesota, and Tennessee with a few isolated populations in Nebraska and Alabama. This species is most common and reaches its largest size in western New York and northern Ohio.

The swamp white oak generally occurs singly in four different forest types: black ash–American elm–red maple, silver maple–American elm, bur oak, and pin oak–sweetgum. Occasionally the swamp white oak is abundant in small areas. It is found within a very wide range of mean annual temperatures from 16 to 4 °C (61 to 39 °F). Extremes in temperature vary from 41 to −34 °C (106 to −29 °F). Average annual precipitation is from 640 to 1,270 millimetres (25 to 50 in). The frost-free period ranges from 210 days in the southern part of the growing area to 120 days in the northern part. The swamp white oak typically grows on hydromorphic soils. It is not found where flooding is permanent, although it is usually found in broad stream valleys, low-lying fields, and the margins of lakes, ponds, or sloughs. It occupies roughly the same ecological niche as pin oak, which seldom lives longer than 100 years, but is not nearly as abundant.

== Uses ==
Swamp white oak has been used for cabinets, boats, railroad crossties, fencing, and cooperage. It is one of the more important white oaks for lumber production. The wood is similar to that of Q. alba and is not differentiated from it in the lumber trade. In recent years, the swamp white oak has become a popular landscaping tree due to its relative ease of transplanting. This is the species that was chosen to be planted around the 911 Memorial Site in Manhattan.

Being in the white oak group, wildlife such as deer, bears, turkeys, ducks, and geese as well as other animals are attracted to this tree when acorns are dropping in the fall.

== Cultivars ==
A mix of Quercus robur fastigiata x Quercus bicolor, named 'Nadler' or the Kindred Spirit hybrid oak, exists.
