= Zelkova × verschaffeltii =

Scientific classification
- Kingdom: Plantae
- Clade: Tracheophytes
- Clade: Angiosperms
- Clade: Eudicots
- Clade: Rosids
- Order: Rosales
- Family: Ulmaceae
- Genus: Zelkova
- Species: Z. × verschaffeltii

Binomial name
- Zelkova × verschaffeltii (Dippel) G.Nicholson

Synonyms
- Zelkova japonica var. verschaffeltii Dippel; Planera × verschaffeltii Dippel; Ulmus × verschaffeltii Dippel

Hybrid species of tree

Zelkova × verschaffeltii is an artificial hybrid of Zelkova carpinifolia × Zelkova serrata.

== Description ==
A large shrub or small, bushy-crowned tree < 15 m tall, with mottled grey and brown bark and graceful habit. The leaves are narrow, 3.5–8 cm long and 1.3–6.6 cm broad, deeply incised with between five and ten pairs of triangular teeth. The fruit is rarely produced, a small two-lobed dry nut-like drupe 4–5 mm diameter.

== Taxonomy ==
Parent species of the artificial hybrid
Zelkova × verschaffeltii

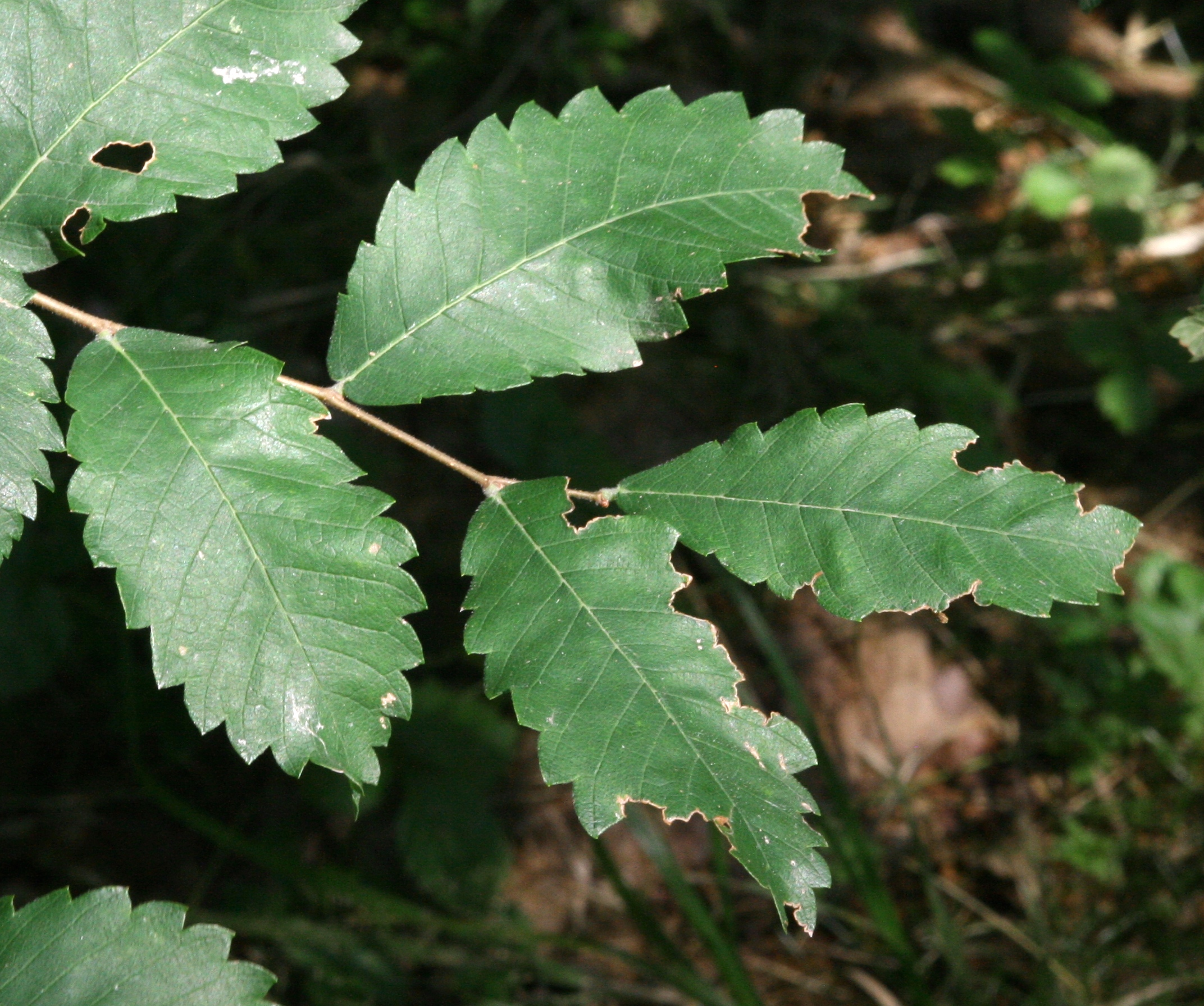
Zelkova carpinifolia

Zelkova serrata

It was first described as Zelkova japonica var. verschaffeltii Dippel by Leopold Dippel in 1892. It was raised to species rank as Zelkova × verschaffeltii (Dippel) G.Nicholson by George Nicholson in 1896. It was initially suspected to be a hybrid between Zelkova carpinifolia and Zelkova abelicea, but the analysis of flavonoids led to the conclusion that it is a hybrid between Zelkova carpinifolia and Zelkova serrata. Zelkova serrata was first introduced into England in 1861, and Zelkova × verschaffeltii has been cultivated since 1886. It may well have been that some of the Z. serrata trees reached sexual maturity before 1886 and crossed with Z. carpinifolia already in cultivation.

=== Etymology ===
The tree is named for the Belgian botanist Ambroise Verschaffelt who owned the Verschaffelt Nursery in Ghent.

== Cultivation ==
First found in cultivation in the van Houtte nursery at Ghent in Belgium before 1885.
