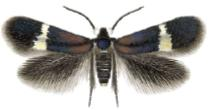

Scientific classification
- Kingdom: Animalia
- Phylum: Arthropoda
- Clade: Pancrustacea
- Class: Insecta
- Order: Lepidoptera
- Family: Nepticulidae
- Genus: Stigmella
- Species: S. speciosa

Binomial name
- Stigmella speciosa (Frey, 1857)

Synonyms
- Nepticula speciosa Frey, 1857; Nepticula pseudoplatanella Weber, 1937

= Stigmella speciosa =

Species of moth

Stigmella speciosa is a moth of the family Nepticulidae. It is found from Denmark to the Iberian Peninsula, Italy and Greece, and from Great Britain to Ukraine.

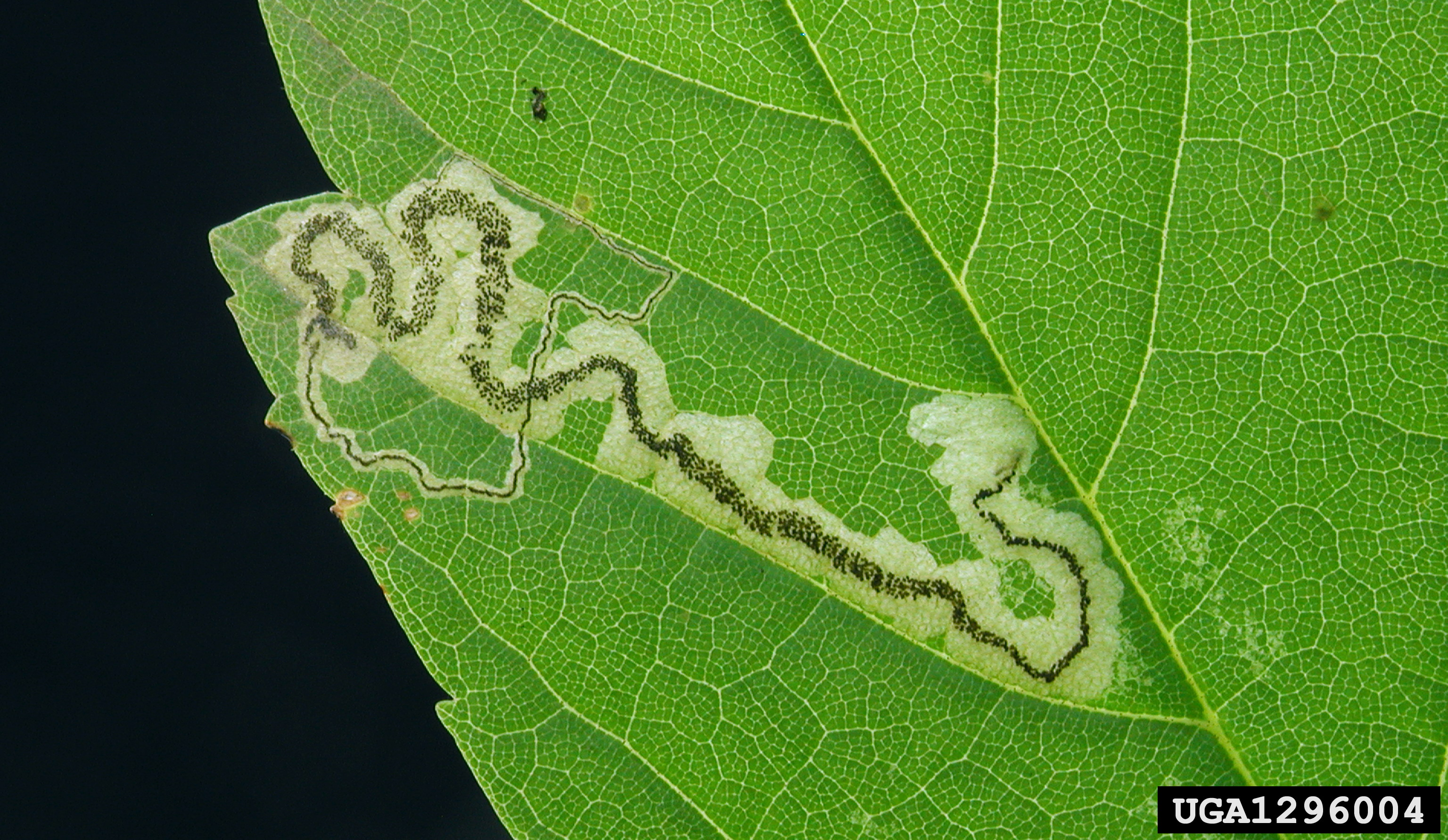
Stigmella speciosa mine

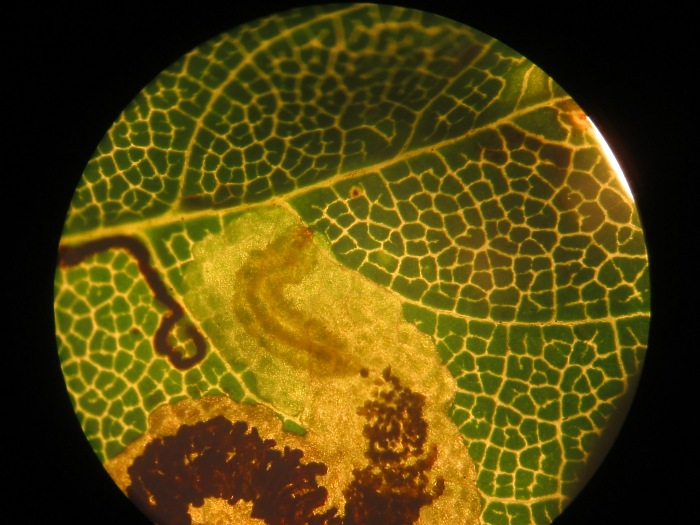
Larva

The wingspan is 4–5 millimetres (0.16–0.20 in). Adults are on wing from May to August.

The larvae feed on Acer monspessulanum, Acer obtusatum, Acer opalus, Acer pseudoplatanus and Acer sempervirens, mining the leaves of their host plant.
