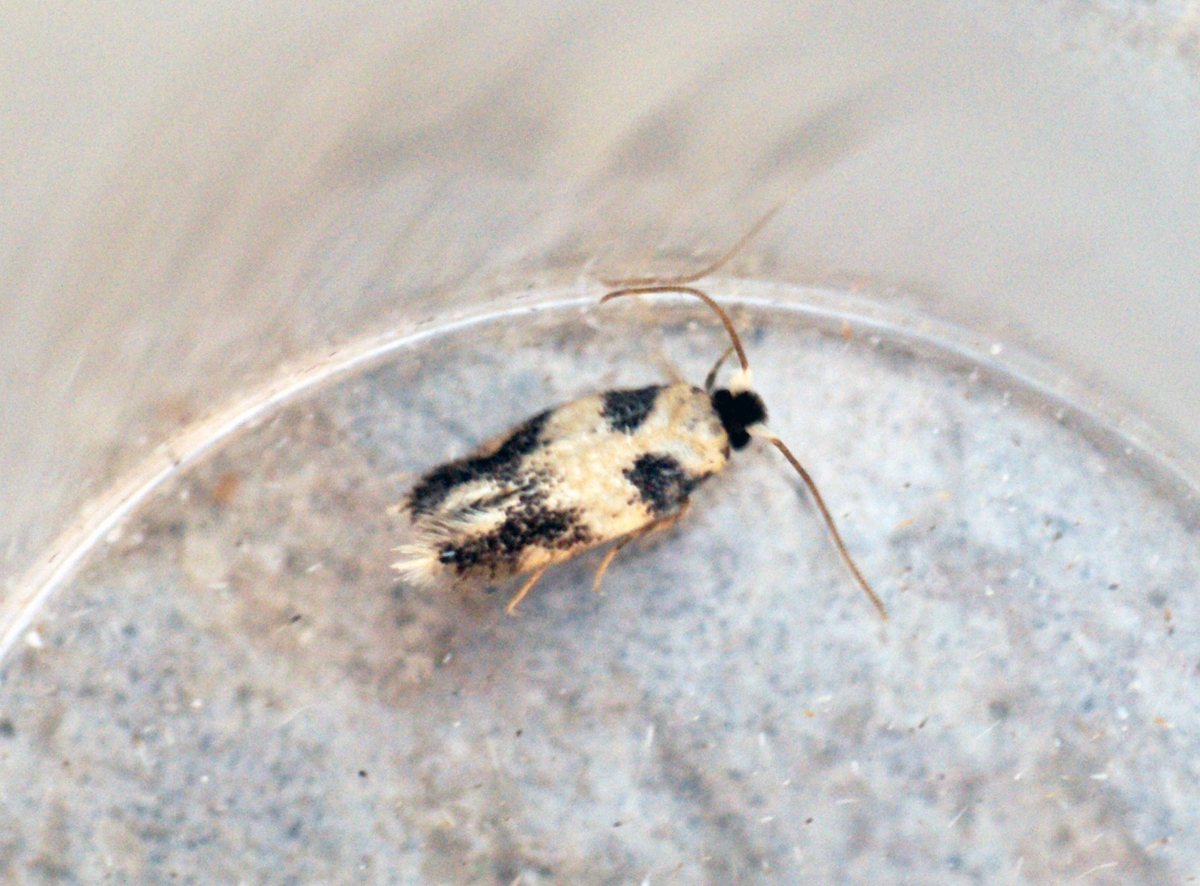

Scientific classification
- Kingdom: Animalia
- Phylum: Arthropoda
- Class: Insecta
- Order: Lepidoptera
- Family: Nepticulidae
- Genus: Ectoedemia
- Species: E. decentella

Binomial name
- Ectoedemia decentella (Herrich-Schaffer, 1855)

Synonyms
- Nepticula decentella Herrich-Schaffer, 1855; Nepticula monspessulanella Jackh, 1951

= Ectoedemia decentella =

Species of moth

Ectoedemia decentella is a moth of the family Nepticulidae found in Europe. It was described in 1855, by the German entomologist and physician, Gottlieb August Wilhelm Herrich-Schäffer.

== Description ==
The wingspan is 5–81 mm. There are two generations per year, with adults on wing in June and again in August.

The larvae feed on field maple (Acer campestre), Montpellier maple (Acer monspessulanum), Acer obtusatum, sycamore (Acer pseudoplatanus) and Cretan maple ((Acer sempervirens). Pupation takes place outside of the mine.

== Distribution ==
It is found from Sweden to the Iberian Peninsula, the Alps and Greece, and from Great Britain to Ukraine.
