= Acleris perfundana =

Scientific classification
- Domain: Eukaryota
- Kingdom: Animalia
- Phylum: Arthropoda
- Class: Insecta
- Order: Lepidoptera
- Family: Tortricidae
- Genus: Acleris
- Species: A. perfundana

Binomial name
- Acleris perfundana Kuznetzov, 1962

Synonyms
- Acleris perfundana var. nigropunctana Kuznetzov, 1962

Species of moth

Acleris perfundana is a species of moth of the family Tortricidae. It is found in Korea, China, Japan and the Russian Far East (Amur, Primorye).

The wingspan is about 17 mm.

The larvae feed on Quercus serrata, Quercus mongolica, Zelkova serrata and Zelkova schneideriana.
