= Berlese =

Berlese or Berlèse is a surname. Notable people with the surname include:

- Antonio Berlese (1863–1927), Italian entomologist
- Augusto Napoleone Berlese (1864–1903), Italian botanist and mycologist, brother of Antonio
- Lorenzo Berlèse (1784–1863), Italian botanist
