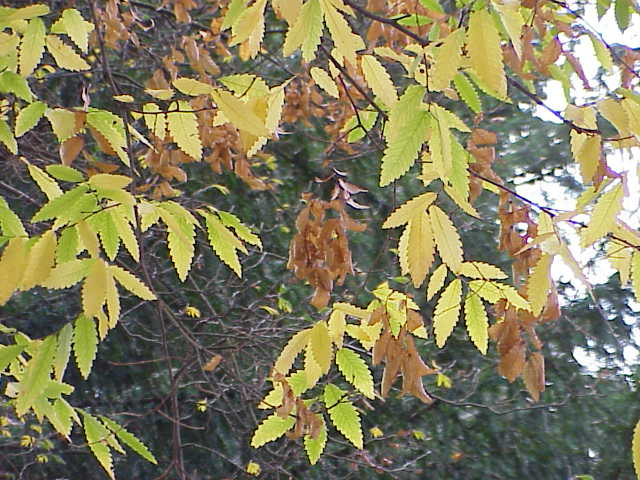
- Autumn foliage

Conservation status
- Vulnerable (IUCN 3.1)

Scientific classification
- Kingdom: Plantae
- Clade: Tracheophytes
- Clade: Angiosperms
- Clade: Eudicots
- Clade: Rosids
- Order: Rosales
- Family: Ulmaceae
- Genus: Zelkova
- Species: Z. carpinifolia

Binomial name
- Zelkova carpinifolia (Pall.) Dippel

Synonyms
- Zelkova acuminata Planch.; Zelkova crenata Spach; Zelkova ulmoides C.K.Schneid.

= Zelkova carpinifolia =

Species of tree

Zelkova carpinifolia, known as Caucasian zelkova, Caucasian elm or just zelkova, is a species of Zelkova, native to the Caucasus, Kaçkar, and Alborz mountains of eastern Europe and southwest Asia.

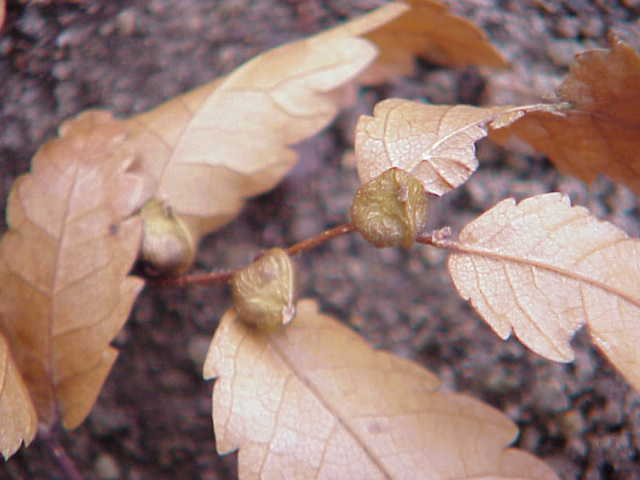
Fruit, late autumn

It is a medium-sized to large deciduous tree growing to 20–35 m (66–115 ft) tall, with a trunk of up to 2 m (6 ft 7 in) in diameter. The crown is a highly distinctive vase-shape, with a short broad trunk dividing low down into numerous nearly erect branches. The leaves are alternate, 4–10 cm (1.6–3.9 in) long and 2.5–6 cm (1–2 3/8 in) broad, the margin bluntly serrated with 7–12 teeth on each side. The flowers are inconspicuous and greenish, with no petals, and are wind-pollinated. The fruit is a small nutlet 5–6 mm (3/16–1/4 in) in diameter.

It is grown as an ornamental tree in Europe (huge exemplars of it can be found quite often in the western Georgian province of Imereti, used for decorating courtyards in villages and providing pleasant shade) and more rarely in North America (where the related Japanese Z. serrata is more popular).

Hybrid cultivars

- Zelkova × verschaffeltii

== Distribution ==
The two main population centres of Z. carpinifolia are in the Hyrcanian forest of southern Azerbaijan and northern Iran, and the Colchic forest of western Georgia. Other isolated stands can be found in the Karabakh mountains, Anatolia, northwestern and eastern Georgia, and Iranian Kurdistan.
