= Caloptilia onustella =

Scientific classification
- Kingdom: Animalia
- Phylum: Arthropoda
- Clade: Pancrustacea
- Class: Insecta
- Order: Lepidoptera
- Family: Gracillariidae
- Genus: Caloptilia
- Species: C. onustella

Binomial name
- Caloptilia onustella (Hübner, 1813)

Synonyms
- Caloptilia nigrella (Predota, 1917); Caloptilia picipennella (Zeller, 1847); Caloptilia pulchella (Hauder); Caloptilia semifasciella (Bruand, 1858); Caloptilia semifasciella (Doubleday, 1859)

Species of moth

Caloptilia onustella is a moth of the family Gracillariidae. It is known from most of Europe, east to the European part of Russia, Ukraine, Tajikistan and Turkmenistan, as well as Morocco and Turkey.

The larvae feed on Acer species, including Acer campestre, Acer monspessulanum, Acer platanoides and Acer pseudoplatanus. They mine the leaves of their host plant.

== Taxonomy ==
Caloptilia semifascia is often considered to be a form (and thus synonym) of Caloptilia onustella.

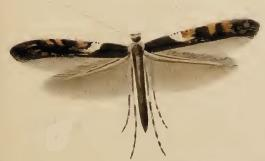
Caloptilia Semifascia
