= Kunihiko Nohara =

Japanese artist and sculptor (born 1982)

- Born: February 13, 1982 (age 44); Eniwa, Hokkaido, Japan
- Known for: sculpture, Painting, drawing

Kunihiko Nohara (born February 13, 1982) is a Japanese artist and sculptor. Born in Hokkaido, Japan, Nohara graduated from the Fine Arts Department of Hiroshima City University in 2005 and attended its graduate school for sculpture where in 2007 he earned hist Master of Fine Art in Sculpture. Nohara mostly creates wooden sculptures using camphor and zelkova trees. Additionally, he creates paintings using wood as a medium. Nohara’s motifs are a combination of abstract images and brilliant colors, adding an avant-garde taste to the powerfulness of wooden sculptures. Swimming caps and goggles are distinctive attributes of the characters that Nohara creates.

Since exhibiting in an art fair in Hong Kong 2010, Nohara has exhibited in Taiwan, Singapore, Malaysia, and other locations in Asia. In 2016, Nohara had his large-scale solo exhibition in Hsinchu, Taiwan.

== Main exhibitions ==
=== Solo exhibitions ===
- 2012 - Kunihiko Nohara, gallery, UG, Tokyo
- 2013 - Kunihiko Nohara, gallery, UG, Tokyo
- 2014 - Kunihiko Nohara, gallery, UG, Tokyo
- 2015 - Kunihiko Nohara, gallery, UG, Tokyo
- 2016 - BREAK TIME, gallery UG, Tokyo
- 2016 - Floating Diary, iart Gallery, Hsinchu, Taiwan
- 2017 - Bittersweet, gallery UG, Tokyo

=== Group exhibitions ===
- 2010 - Atsuo Takahashi and Kunihiko Nohara, Gallery Uniglavas Ginzakan, Tokyo
- 2011 - Rittai Butsubutsu, Bunkamura Gallery, Tokyo
- 2012 - 6 Japanese Contemporary Sculptors, Mitsukoshi, Tainan
- 2013 - Urban Legend, Trio Exhibition by Kunihiko Nohara, Gekko Numata, Kentaro Matsukuma, Capital Art Center、Taipei
- 2013 - Future Temporary, Art Door Gallery, Taipei
- 2014 - Dialogue with Japanese Contemporary Art, Macpro Gallery、Macau
- 2014 - Hiroshima City University 20th Anniversary Exhibition, Hiroshima City University, Hiroshima
- 2014 - Laissez-faire, The Ueno Royal Museum Gallery, Tokyo
- 2015 - Laissez-faire, The Luxe Art Museum, Singapore
- 2015 - Exhibition of Gallery UG Private Collection Yayoi Kusama & Kunihiko Nohara, Christie’s Fine Art Storage Services Viewing Gallery, Singapore

=== Art fairs ===
- 2010 - Asia Top Gallery Hotel Art Fair Hong Kong, Grand Hyatt Hong Kong, Hong Kong
- 2011 - Young Art Taipei, Sunworld Dynasty Hotel Taipei, Taipei
- 2011 - Art Taipei, Taipei World Trade Center, Taipei
- 2012 - Asia Top Gallery Hotel Art fair Hong Kong, Mandarin Oriental Hong Kong, Hong Kong
- 2012 - Young Art Taipei, Sheraton Grande Taipei Hotel, Taipei
- 2012 - Art Taipei, Taipei World Trade Center, Taipei
- 2013 - Bank Art Fair, Island Shangri-La Hong Kong, Hong Kong
- 2015 - Affordable Art Fair - F1 Pit Building, Singapore
- 2015 - Art Apart Fair - Park Royal Hotel on Pickering, Singapore
- 2016 - Art Stage Singapore, Marina Bay Sands, Singapore
- 2016 - Art Fair Tokyo Kunihiko Nohara Break Time ? Tokyo International Forum, Tokyo
- 2016 - Bazaar Art Jakarta, The Ritz-Carlton Jakarta Pacific Place, Jakarta
- 2016 - Art Expo Malaysia Plus - Matrade Exhibition & Convention Centre, Kuala Lumpur
- 2016 - 6075 Macau Hotel Art Fair - Regency Hotel Macau, Macau
- 2017 - Art Stage Singapore - Marina Bay Sands, Singapore
- 2017 - Art Fair Tokyo - Tokyo International Forum, Tokyo
- 2017 - Young Art Taipei - Sheraton Grande Taipei Hotel, Taipei
