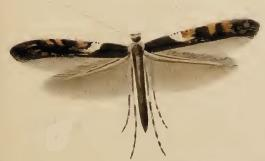

Scientific classification
- Domain: Eukaryota
- Kingdom: Animalia
- Phylum: Arthropoda
- Class: Insecta
- Order: Lepidoptera
- Family: Gracillariidae
- Genus: Caloptilia
- Species: C. semifascia

Binomial name
- Caloptilia semifascia (Haworth, 1828)

Synonyms
- Gracilaria semifascia Haworth, 1828

= Caloptilia semifascia =

Species of moth

Caloptilia semifascia is a moth of the family Gracillariidae. It is known from most of Europe, except the Iberian Peninsula, Ireland, Iceland and the western part of the Balkan Peninsula.

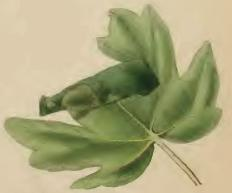
Leaf of maple, with a portion rolled into a cone by the larva

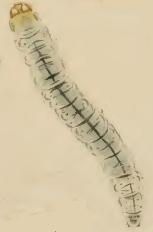
Larva

The wingspan is 10–12 mm. Adults are on wing from late July to October and again, after hibernating, until May.

The larvae feed on Acer campestre. They mine the leaves of their host plant.

== Taxonomy ==
Some authors consider it a synonym of Caloptilia onustella.
