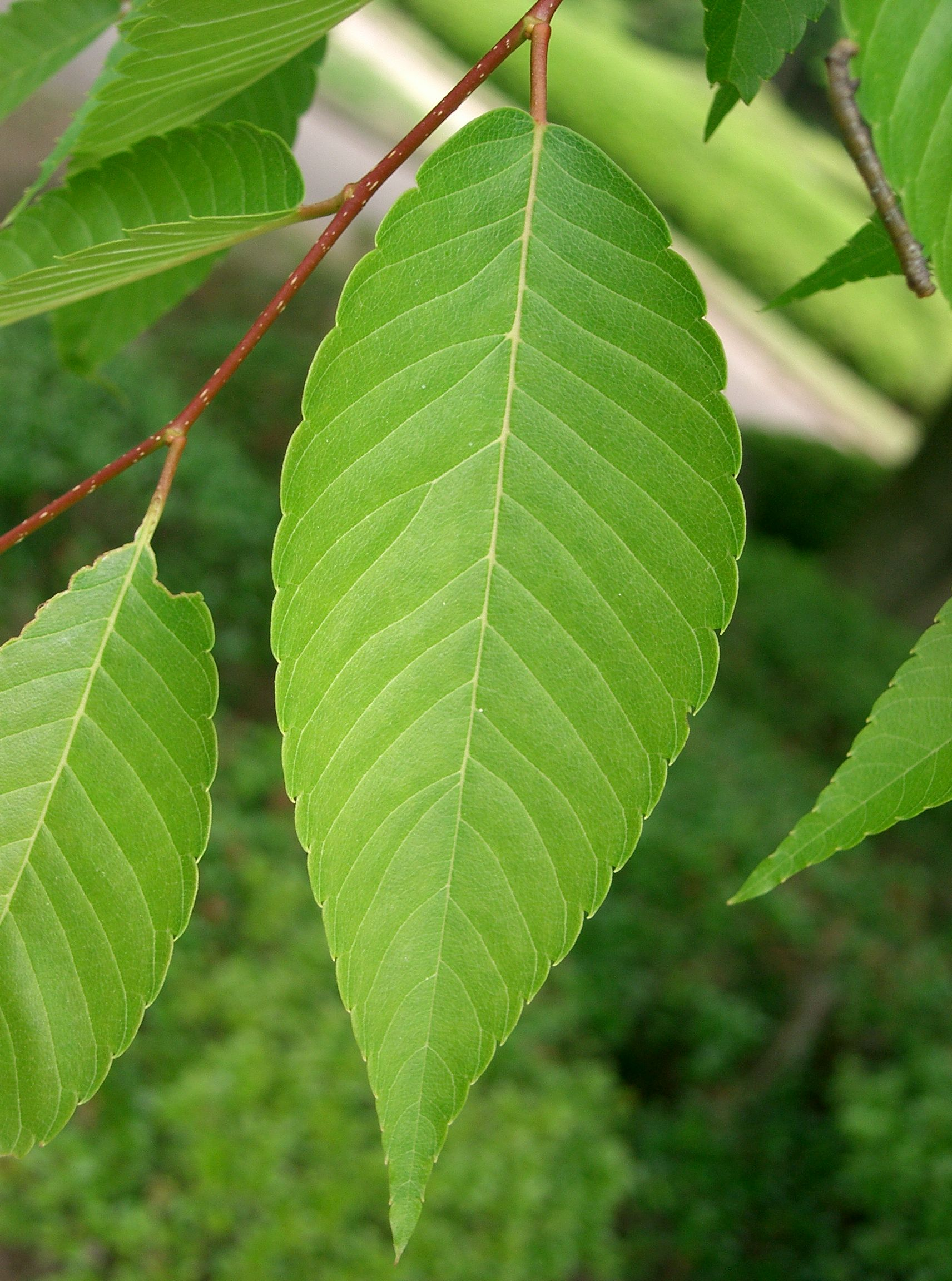
- Zelkova serrata

Scientific classification
- Kingdom: Plantae
- Clade: Embryophytes
- Clade: Tracheophytes
- Clade: Angiosperms
- Clade: Eudicots
- Clade: Rosids
- Order: Rosales
- Family: Ulmaceae
- Genus: Zelkova; Spach

= Zelkova =

Zelkova Temporal range: Late Cretaceous–Recent

Genus of trees

Zelkova (from the Georgian dzelkva, 'stone pillar') is a genus of six species of deciduous trees in the elm family Ulmaceae, native to southern Europe, and southwest and eastern Asia. They vary in size from shrubs (Z. sicula) to large trees up to 35 m (115 ft) tall (Z. carpinifolia). The bark is smooth, dark brown. Unlike elms, the branchlets are never corky or winged. The leaves are alternate, with serrated margins, and (unlike the related elms) a symmetrical base to the leaf blade. The leaves are in two distinct rows; they have pinnate venation and each vein extends to the leaf margin, where it terminates in a tooth. There are two stipules at each node, though these are caducous (shed early), leaving a pair of scars at the leaf base. Zelkova is polygamous. Staminate flowers are clustered in the lower leaf axils of young branchlets; the perianth is campanulate, with four to six (to seven) lobes, and the stamens are short. Pistillate and hermaphrodite flowers are solitary, or rarely in clusters of two to four, in the upper leaf axils of young branchlets. The fruit is a dry, nut-like drupe with a dorsal keel, produced singly in the leaf axils. The perianth and stigma are persistent.

== Species and distribution ==
- Zelkova abelicea – Cretan zelkova (Crete in Greece)
- Zelkova carpinifolia – Caucasian zelkova (Turkey, Georgia, Armenia, Azerbaijan, Iran)
- Zelkova serrata – Keyaki or Japanese zelkova (Japan, Korea, Kuril Islands in Russia, Taiwan, China)
  - Zelkova serrata var. serrata
  - Zelkova serrata var. tarokoensis
- Zelkova sicula – Sicilian zelkova (Sicily, Italy, in two locations: Bosco Pisano and Ciranna)
- Zelkova sinica – Chinese zelkova (China)
- Zelkova schneideriana – Schneider's zelkova (China)

Hybrids

- Zelkova × verschaffeltii – Cut-leaf zelkova (Z. carpinifolia × Z. serrata)

== Ecology ==
The genus Zelkova was common throughout northern Europe and North America as late as the Pliocene. However, extensive Pleistocene glaciation has confined the genus to its present range to the eastern Mediterranean islands and the Caucasus, and in eastern Asia where only local glaciation occurred. Species of Zelkova were important elements of the vast forests that prevailed throughout the Northern Hemisphere during much of the Cenozoic.

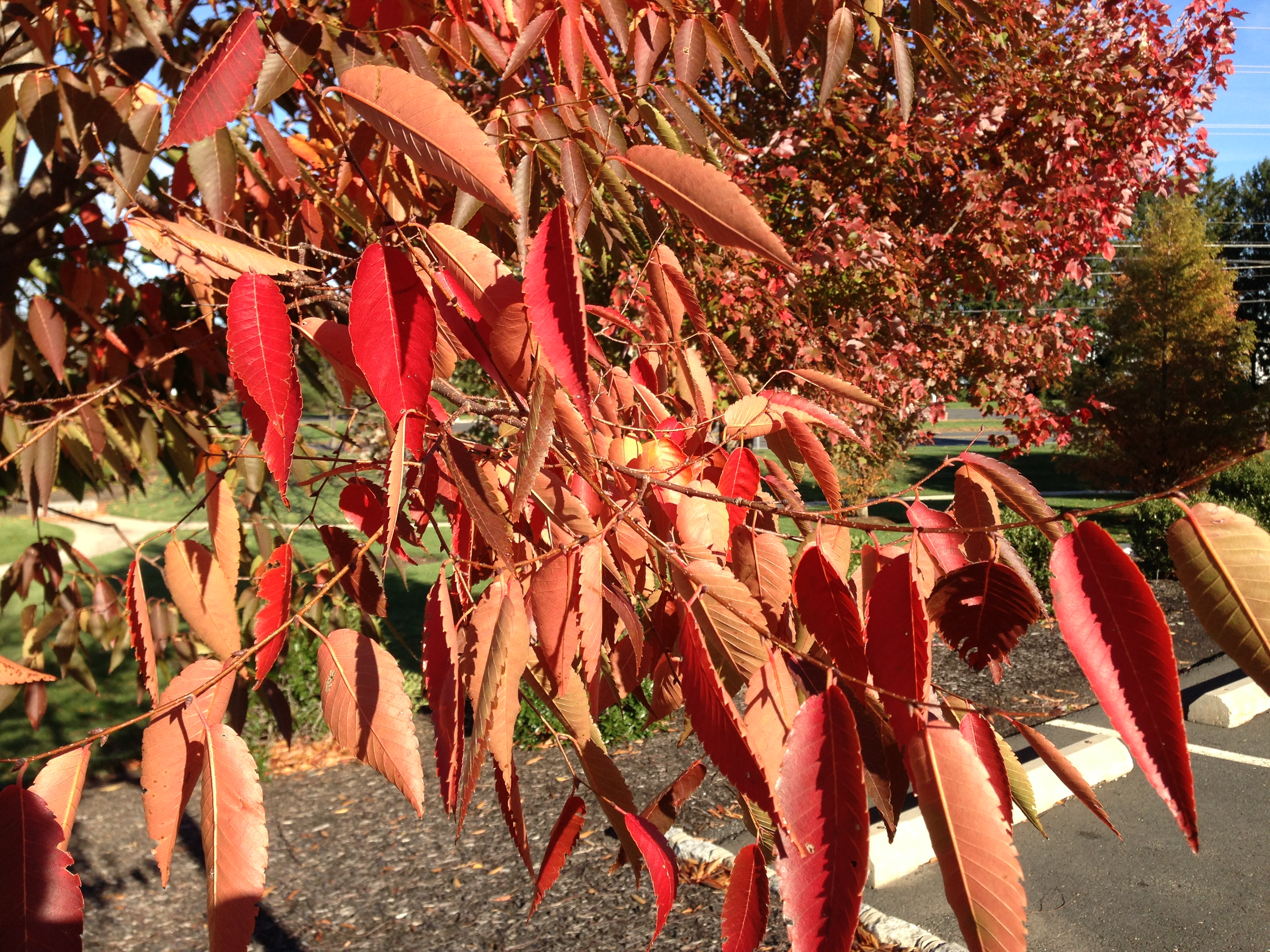
Autumn foliage

Today, the genus comprises six species with disjunct distribution patterns: three in eastern Asia [Zelkova serrata (Thunb.) Makino; Zelkova schneideriana Hand.-Mazz.; and Zelkova sinica C. K. Schneid.], one in southwestern Asia [Zelkova carpinifolia (Pall.) C. Koch] and two on the Mediterranean islands of Sicily (Zelkova sicula Di Pasq., Garfi & Quézel) and Crete [Zelkova abelicea (Lam.) Boiss.]. The oldest fossils attributed to Zelkova date from the early Eocene (55 million years ago) in western North America, where the genus is extinct today. In Bulgaria, Zelkova fossils were found in Paleogene and Neogene layers in the following locations: Zelkova ungeri (Ett.) Kov. — Lozenets, Kurilo, Chukurovo in Sofia Region, Dospey in Samokov Region, Pernik, Pirin Mine in Blagoevgrad Region, Bobov Dol in Kyustendil Region; Zelkova praelonga Berger — Pirin Mine in Blagoevgrad Region.

Zelkova abelicea is endemic to Crete (Greece); it has a fragmentary distribution in the four main mountain regions of Crete (Lefka Ori, Psiloritis, Dikti and Thrypti), between 900 and 1800 m above sea level, which corresponds to the upper timberline. It grows mainly on north-facing slopes or in and around rocky river-beds and gullies which remain moist during dry summers. The species is highly endangered through habitat fragmentation and destruction, overgrazing, fire and water stress.

The Sicilian Zelkova Z. sicula, only discovered in 1991, is listed as an endangered species. The two known populations close to Syracuse (Bosco Pisano and Ciranna) comprise a small number of low shrubs suffering from severe overgrazing; the natural mature size of undamaged specimens is unknown.

Whilst all the known Zelkova taxa are currently in cultivation and in botanic gardens or arboreta, relatively few collections are known to be from wild sourced material or known in the countries of their natural distribution. Z. sicula and Z. abelicea are the two taxa considered to be at most risk of extinction (Critically Endangered and Vulnerable). These two Zelkova species are the two with the most restricted natural distribution—both are small island endemics. The Zelkova with the widest natural distribution, Z. serrata, is also the most common Zelkova in botanic garden collections.

Phylogeography, using chloroplast and mitochondrial markers, has mostly focused on the Quaternary and the influence of the cycles of glaciation on species distribution and structure. Phylogeography has, however, also been used to document more ancient patterns, with some of them presumably dating as far back as the early Miocene. The retrieval of ancient patterns may be specific to tree species, which are assumed to evolve more slowly than herbaceous plants and shrubs. Zelkova trees live for centuries, which is a good indication that ancient patterns might be recovered using molecular markers.

A few phylogenetic and biogeographical studies have been carried out on Zelkova, but these studies had small sample sizes or weak representation of wild populations. A more comprehensive phylogeographical analysis, based on trnH–psbA, trnL and internal transcribed spacer regions 1 and 2 (ITS1 and ITS2), was the first to use a wide sampling of natural populations from nearly all the disjunct regions where Z. abelicea, Z. carpinifolia and Z. sicula presently grow. It aimed to assess the diversity within and among species using DNA from two cellular compartments that have different modes of inheritance and trace different histories.

== Cultivation and uses ==
Zelkova serrata and Z. carpinifolia are grown as ornamental trees. The wood is hard, used for making furniture. In Japan, the wood of the keyaki, or Z. serrata is used for making drums, called wadaiko. The most desired drums are hollowed out of a trunk of a zelkova tree, but in many cases, the drum is fashioned from staves of keyaki wood, using the same method as when constructing a barrel.

== Etymology ==
The name Zelkova derives from the native name of Z. carpinifolia in the Georgian language – one of the Kartvelian languages spoken in the Caucasus, as shown by the Georgian name, dzelkva, from the words dzeli, meaning 'bar' or 'pillar', and kva, meaning 'rock' or 'stone' The tree was often used for making rock-hard and durable bars for building and furniture.
