= Ambroise Verschaffelt =

Belgian botanist (1825–1886)

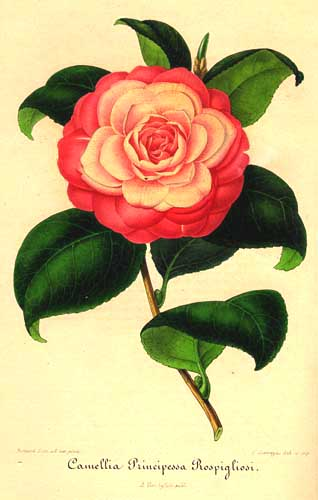
A plate of Camellia Principessa Rospigliosi from Nouvelle Iconographie volume 4 (1853)

Ambroise Colette Alexandre Verschaffelt (11 December 1825 – 16 May 1886) was a Belgian horticulturist and writer.

His grandfather Pierre-Antoine (1764–1844) was amongst the founders of the "Floralies gantoises" in 1808. His father Alexandre (1801–1850) was a major horticulturist of his city. The Verschaffelts were a family of Belgian nurserymen specializing in Camellia, Azalea, and palms. They introduced many new species from abroad–in particular from South America–collected for them by "plant hunters".

They published the Nouvelle Iconographie des Camellias (1848–1860) : it continues Lorenzo Berlèse’s work Iconographie du genre Camellia. In 1854, Ambroise took over from Charles Lemaire "Le Jardin Fleuriste" which became "L'Illustration Horticole" in 1858. Ambroise sold his business to Jean Linden (1817–1899) in 1869, together with "L'Illustration Horticole". He then retired but continued to be active on the botanical scene an acted at different occasions as a counselor to King Léopold II for his famous hothouses of Laeken. Ambroise was vice-president of the Royal Society for Agriculture and Botany of Ghent; he obtained numerous medals and prizes in horticultural exhibitions in his own country as well as in the United Kingdom (Cheltenham 1853, London 1861), Russia (Saint Petersburg 1869) and other countries.

== Family ==
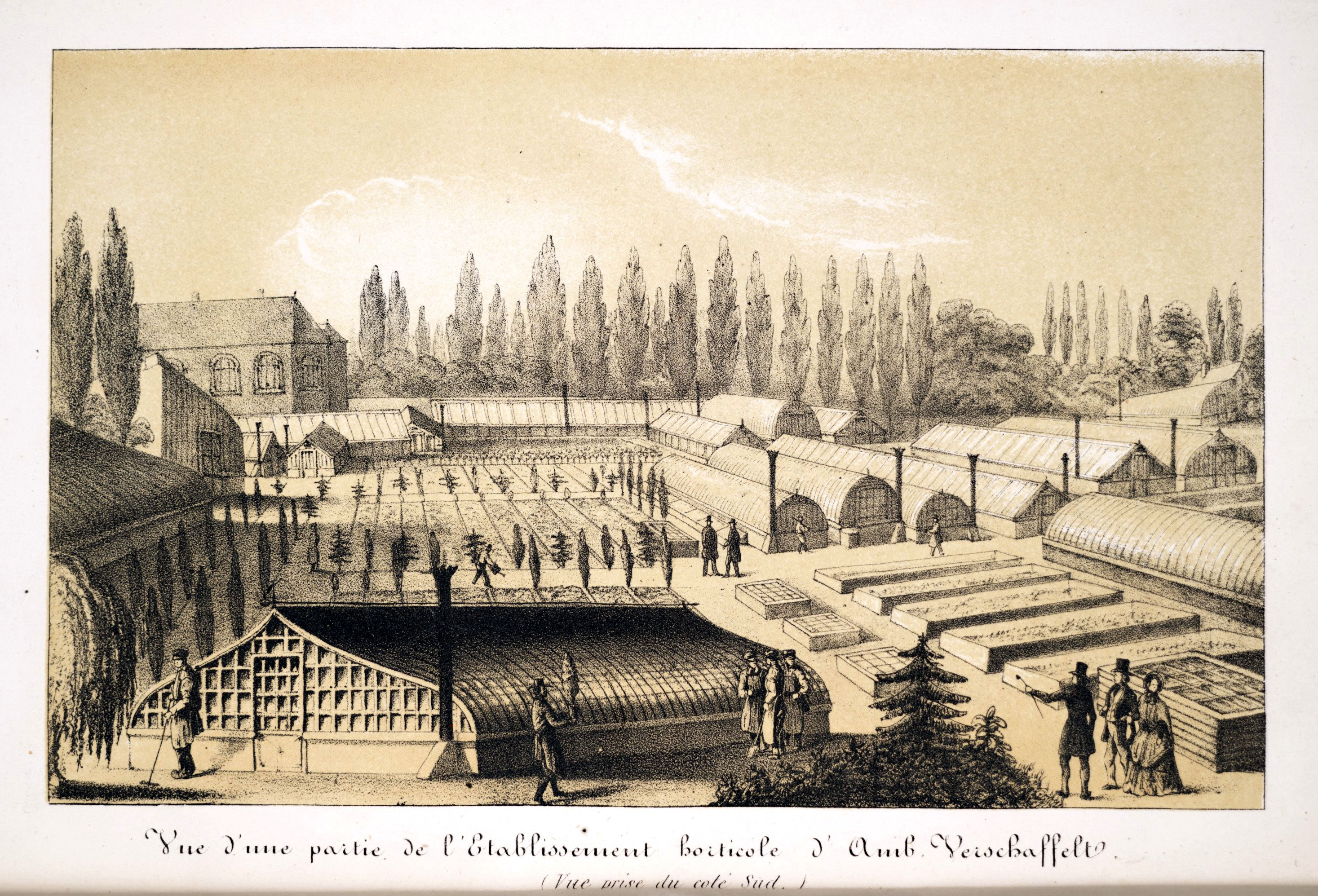
The Verschaffelt nursery in Ghent (1854).

- Pierre-Antoine Verschaffelt (1764–1844), not to be mistaken with the sculptor Pieter-Antoon Verschaffelt (1710–1793),
- Alexandre-Jacques Verschaffelt (1801–1850) first son of P-A Verschaffelt,
- Louis Verschaffelt, second son of P-A Verschaffelt,
- Jean-Charles Verschaffelt, (d. 1884) third son of P-A Verschaffelt,
- Ambroise Verschaffelt (1825–1886), son of Alexandre-Jacques Verschaffelt,
- Jean Nuytens-Verschaffelt (1836–1880), adopted son of Jean-Charles Verschaffelt.

== External links and sources ==
- L'Illustration horticole. 1854. (several volumes full text at google book search)
- camellia Madame Ambroise Verschaffelt
- The Standard Cyclopedia of Horticulture: A Discussion for the Amateur, and ...by Liberty Hyde Bailey – Gardening – 1917 (at Google Books)
- The Culture of Camellias annotated bibliography
