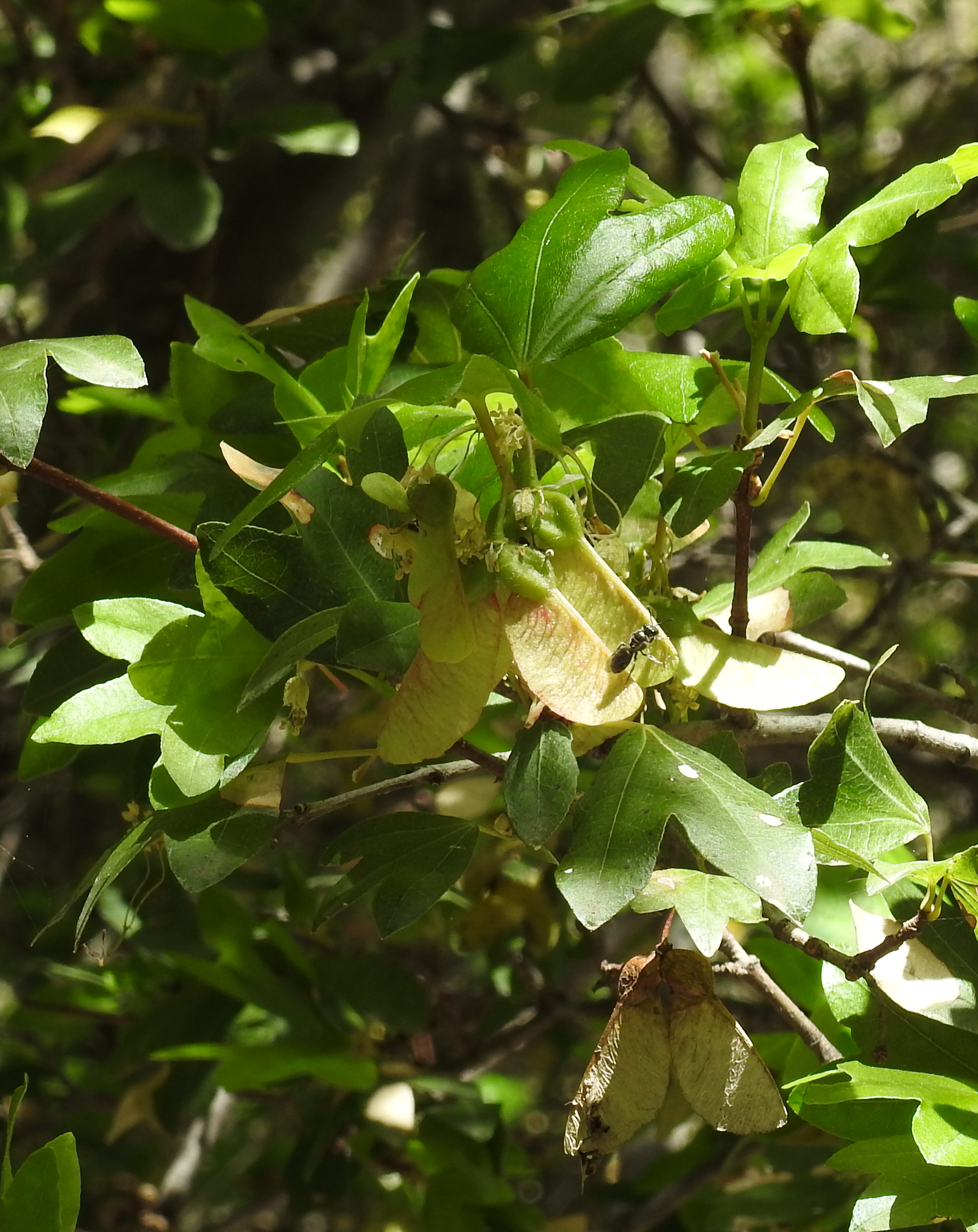

Conservation status
- Least Concern (IUCN 3.1)

Scientific classification
- Kingdom: Plantae
- Clade: Tracheophytes
- Clade: Angiosperms
- Clade: Eudicots
- Clade: Rosids
- Order: Sapindales
- Family: Sapindaceae
- Genus: Acer
- Section: Acer sect. Acer
- Series: Acer ser. Monspessulana
- Species: A. sempervirens

Binomial name
- Acer sempervirens L. 1767
- Distribution map

Synonyms
- Acer heterophyllum Willd.; Acer humile Salisb.; Acer orientale L.; Acer willkommii Wettst.

= Acer sempervirens =

Species of maple

Acer sempervirens, the Cretan maple, is a species of maple native to southern Greece and south-western Turkey.

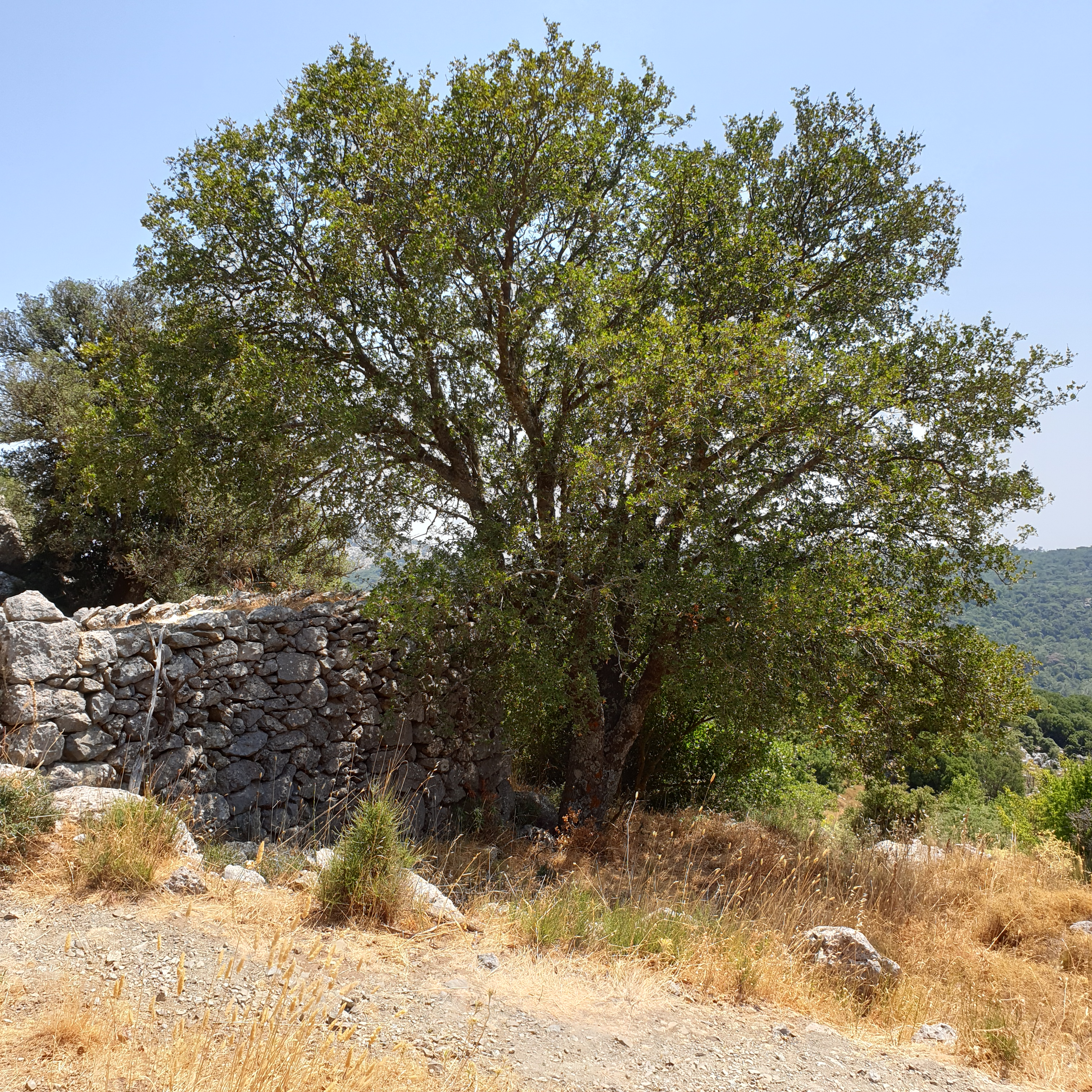
Cretan maple (Asfendamos), Dikti Mountains, Crete

== Description ==
Acer sempervirens is an evergreen or semi-evergreen shrub or small tree, one of the very few evergreen species in the genus. It grows to 10 metres (33 ft) tall with a trunk up to 50 centimetres (20 in) in diameter. The bark is dark grey, smooth in young trees, becoming scaly and shallowly fissured in mature trees. The shoots are green at first, becoming dull brown in the second year. The leaves are opposite, hard and leathery in texture, 1–4 centimetres (0.39–1.57 in) long and 1–3 centimetres (0.39–1.18 in) across, glossy dark green with a yellow 1 centimetre (0.39 in) petiole, variably unlobed or three-lobed (often on the same shoot); the lobes have an entire (toothless) margin. The flowers are yellow-green, produced in small pendulous corymbs. The fruit is a double samara with two rounded, winged seeds, the wings 1.5–3 centimetres (0.59–1.18 in) long, spread at an acute angle.

It is one of the most drought- and heat-tolerant species in the genus, occurring on dry, sunny hillsides at moderate elevations. It is closely related to Acer monspessulanum from further north and west in Europe, differing from it in being a smaller, often shrubby tree, and in its smaller, evergreen leaves.

== Distribution and habitat ==
This species is restricted to Greece, where it is found in the Peloponnese, the Aegean Islands, and Crete, and to southwestern Anatolia in Turkey.

It thrives in mountainous regions, growing at elevations from 300 to 1,700 meters. The species is typically found in maquis, forest edges, and roadside thickets, and it occasionally forms pure stands on Greek islands. In Greece, it is particularly common on limestone slopes with scattered trees of Juniperus drupacea. On Crete, it grows alongside the endemic Zelkova abelicea, where it is often considered a pioneer or secondary forest species.

== Cultivation and uses ==
Cretan maple is occasionally grown as an ornamental tree in western Europe; it was first introduced to Britain in 1752. A Cretan Maple was planted by Joseph Pitton de Tournefort in Paris's Jardin des Plantes in 1702, and remains standing.

== Gallery ==
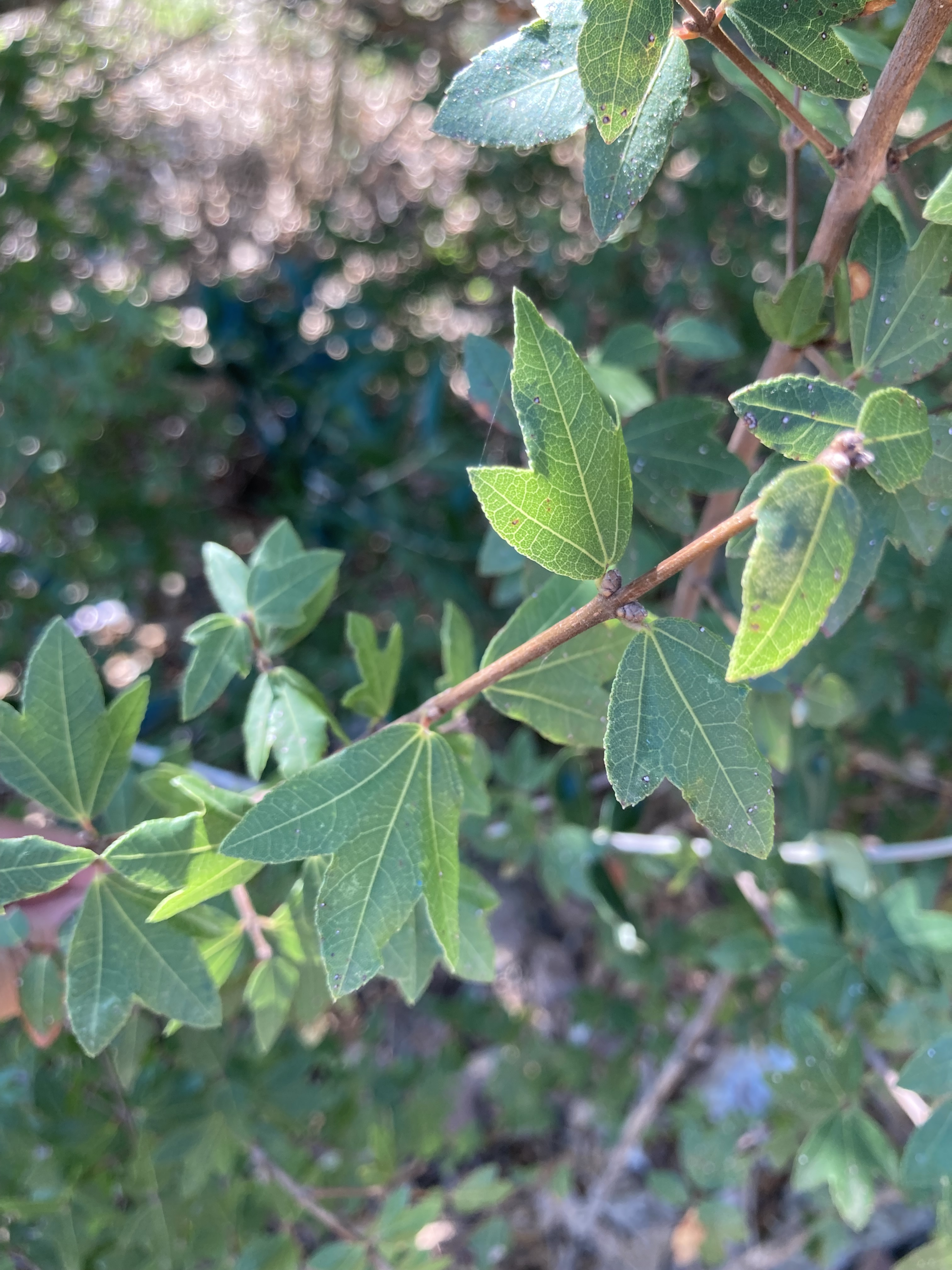
Cretan maple from Kythera.

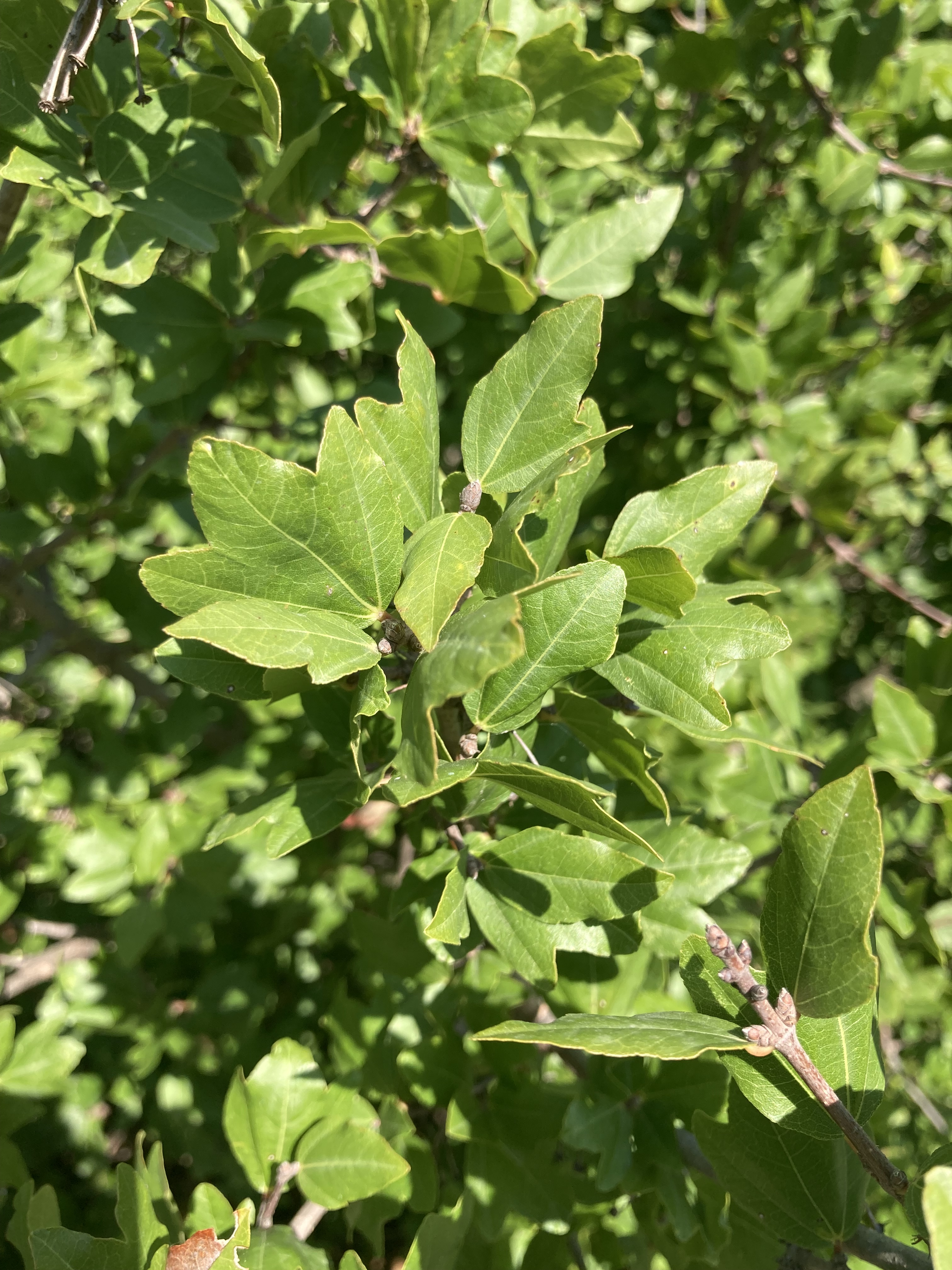
Another Cretan maple in Kythera.
