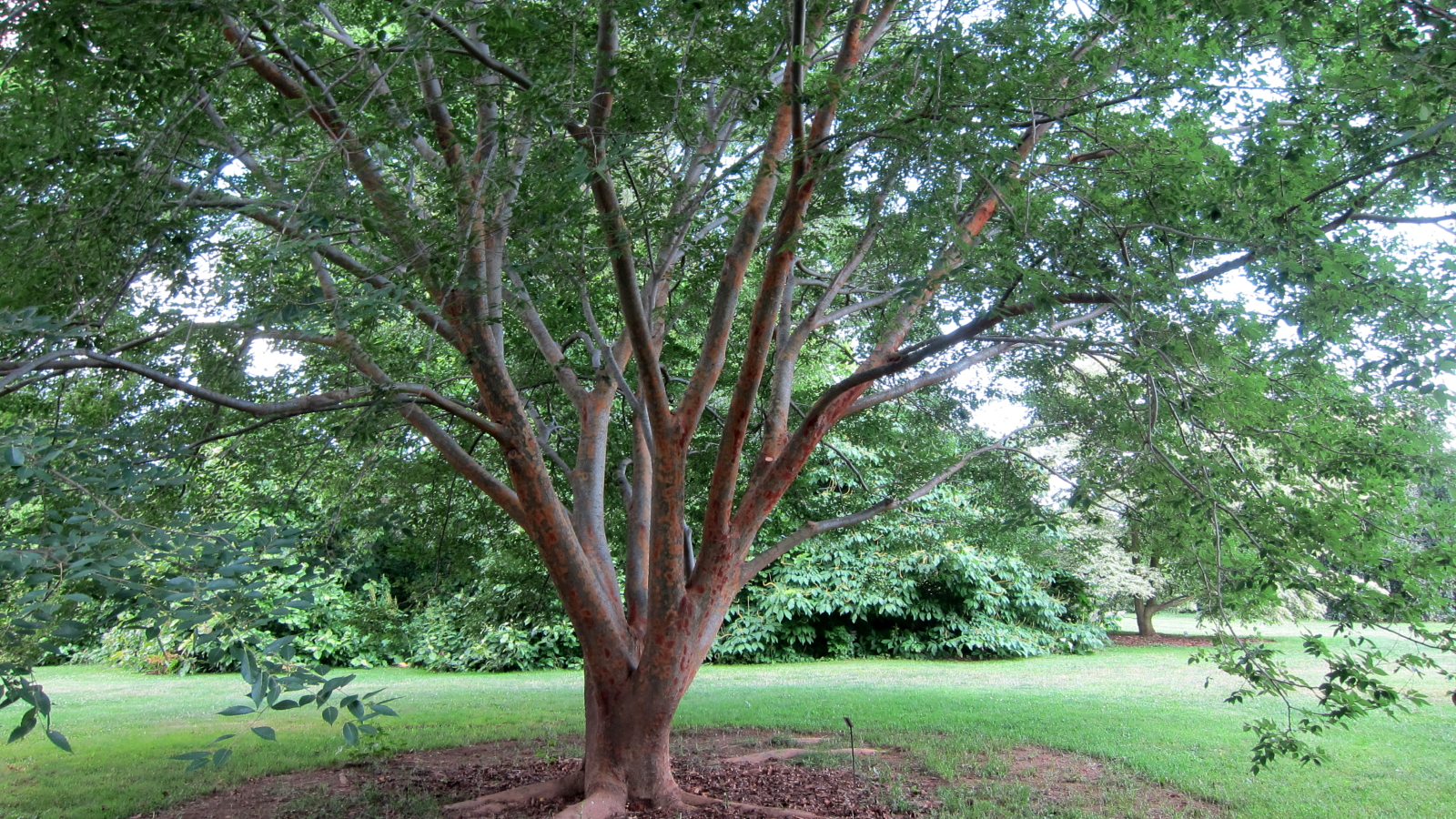
- Zelkova sinica in Wave Hill, New York City

Scientific classification
- Kingdom: Plantae
- Clade: Tracheophytes
- Clade: Angiosperms
- Clade: Eudicots
- Clade: Rosids
- Order: Rosales
- Family: Ulmaceae
- Genus: Zelkova
- Species: Z. sinica

Binomial name
- Zelkova sinica C.K.Schneid.

= Zelkova sinica =

Species of flowering plant

Zelkova sinica, the Chinese zelkova, is a species of flowering plant in the family Ulmaceae, native to central and southeastern China. A well-known landscaping tree in China, it is also used as a street tree in a number of cities in Europe and the United States.
