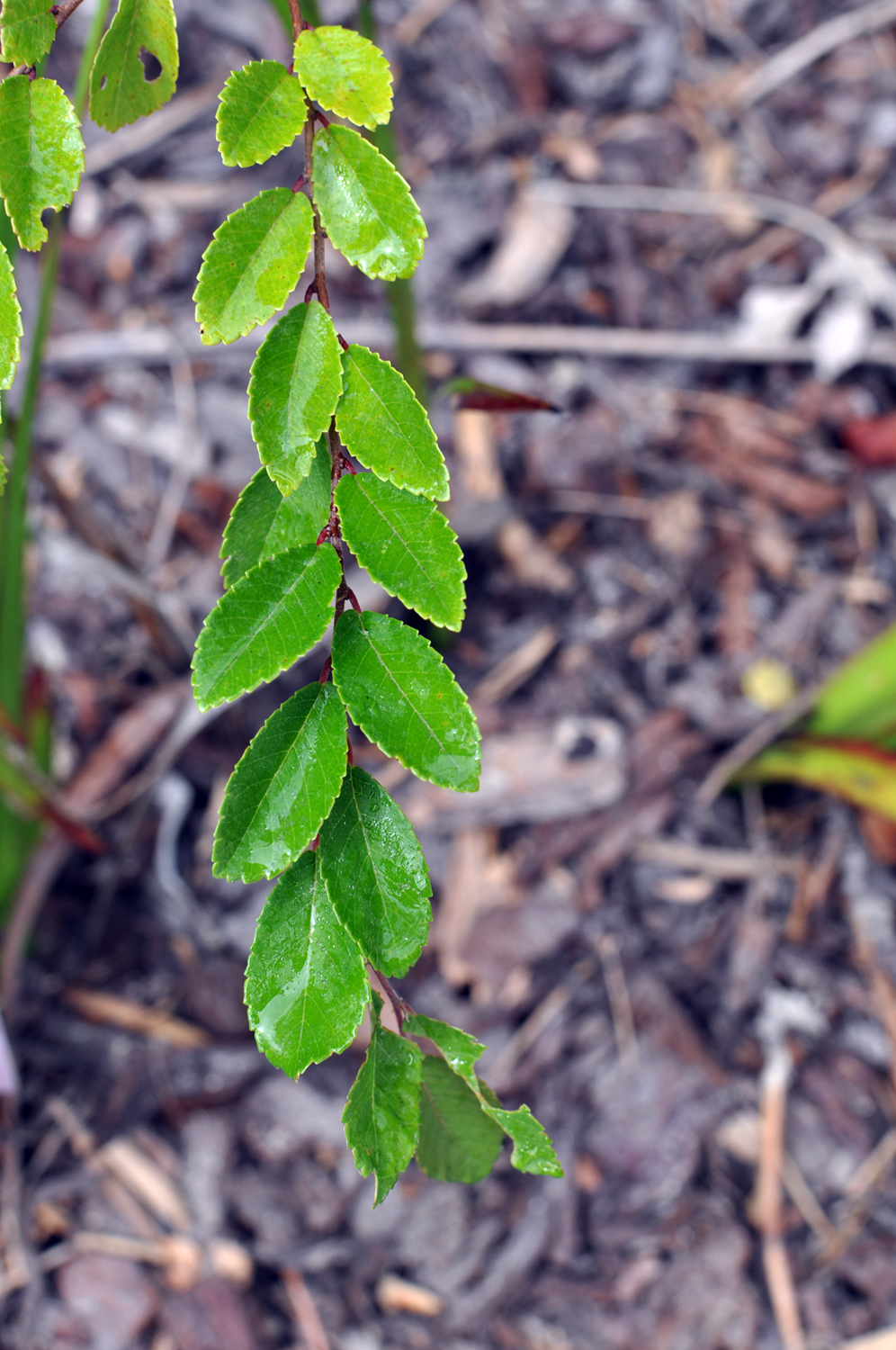

Conservation status
- Critically Endangered (IUCN 3.1)

Scientific classification
- Kingdom: Plantae
- Clade: Tracheophytes
- Clade: Angiosperms
- Clade: Eudicots
- Clade: Rosids
- Order: Rosales
- Family: Ulmaceae
- Genus: Zelkova
- Species: Z. sicula

Binomial name
- Zelkova sicula Di Pasq., Garfì & Quézel

= Zelkova sicula =

Species of flowering plant

Zelkova sicula is a species of Zelkova in the family Ulmaceae. It is a shrub endemic to Sicily.

== Description ==
It is a deciduous shrub growing to 2–3 metres (7–10 ft) tall; its natural mature size is unknown, as all existing specimens have been heavily browsed by goats, limiting their growth. The leaves are oval, 10–50 millimetres (0.4–2.0 in) long and 5–35 mm (0.2–1.4 in) wide, with a petiole 1–4 mm (0.04–0.16 in) long; the margins are lobed, with 6–8 lobes on each side.

== Conservation ==
The only known population, found in 1991, consists of 200–250 plants growing on the Monti Iblei area, in Buccheri, in southeast Sicily near Syracuse. This population are all thought to derive from possibly just one clone, or at the most only a very few distinct individuals. Its natural habitat is temperate forests and Mediterranean-type shrubby vegetation. It is threatened by habitat loss. The IUCN list this species as Critically Endangered.

== Accessions ==
- Icomb Place gardens, as Z. sicula
