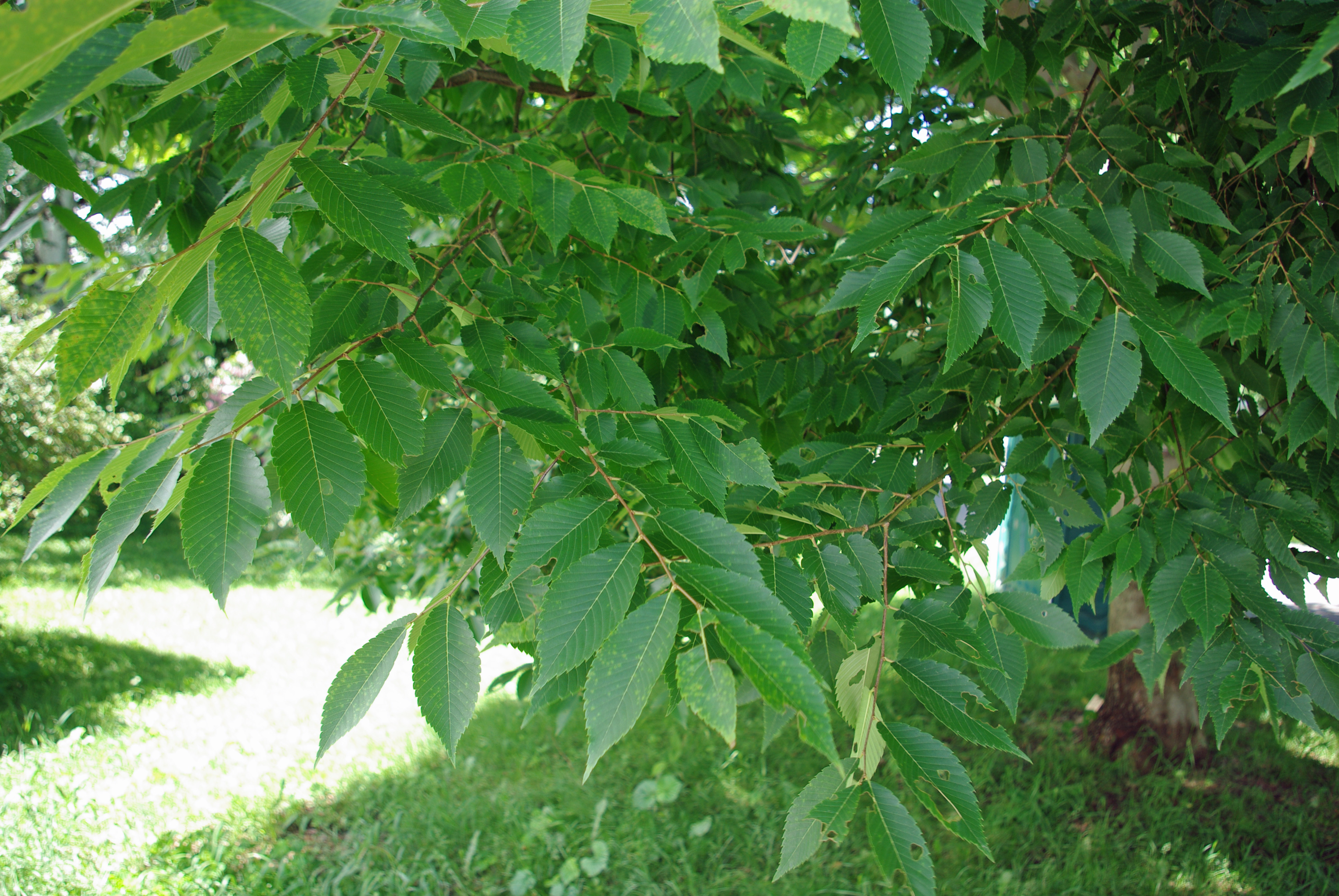
- Foliage
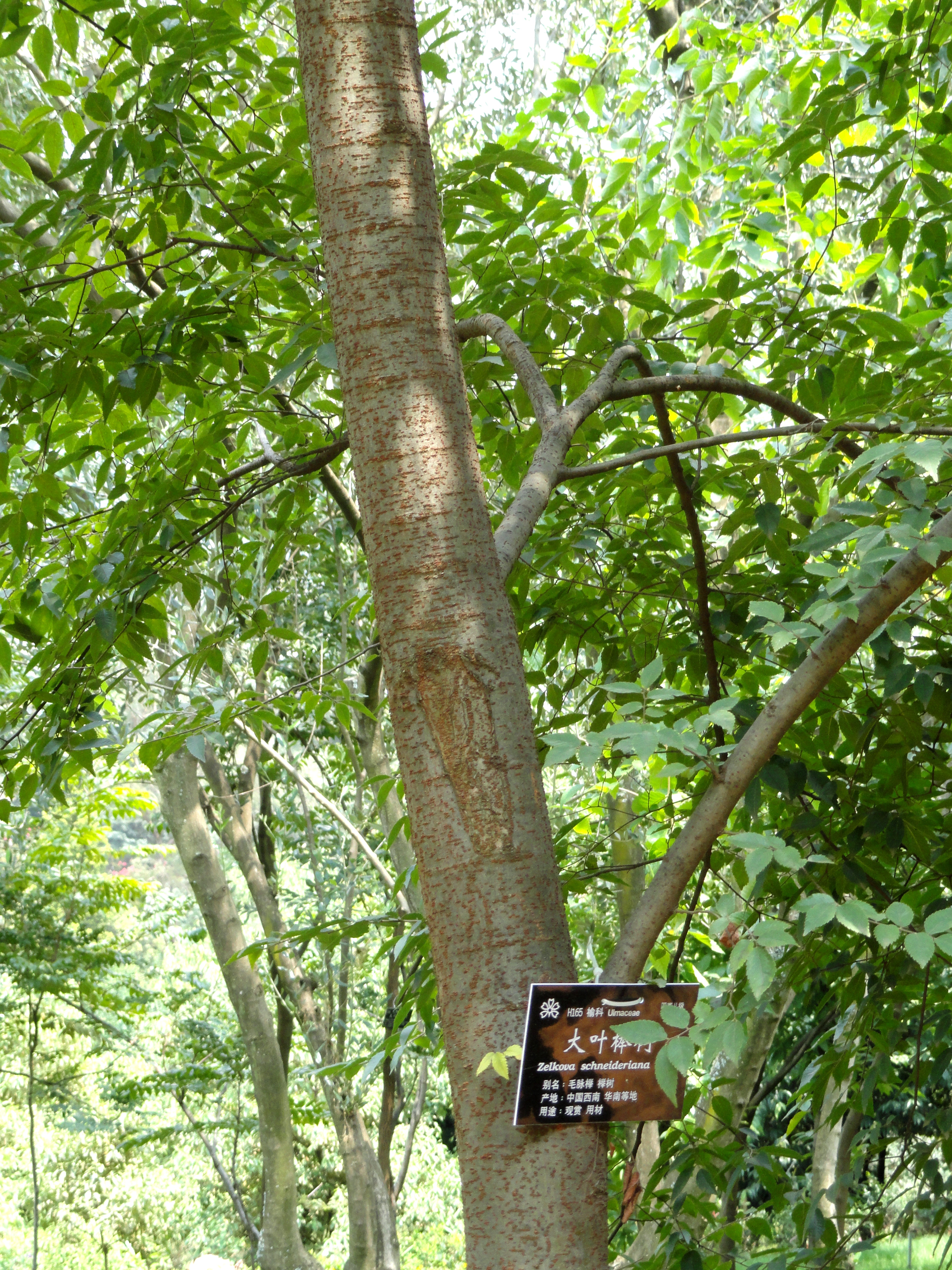
- Detail of trunk at the Kunming Institute of Botany

Scientific classification
- Kingdom: Plantae
- Clade: Embryophytes
- Clade: Tracheophytes
- Clade: Spermatophytes
- Clade: Angiosperms
- Clade: Eudicots
- Clade: Rosids
- Order: Rosales
- Family: Ulmaceae
- Genus: Zelkova
- Species: Z. schneideriana

Binomial name
- Zelkova schneideriana Hand.-Mazz.

= Zelkova schneideriana =

Species of flowering plant

Zelkova schneideriana, the Chinese zelkova (a name it shares with other members of its genus), is a species of flowering plant in the family Ulmaceae. It is found in southeastern Tibet, and central and southern China, usually alongside streams. A fast-growing deciduous tree with attractive exfoliating bark, it can reach 35 m (115 ft) tall and have a DBH of 80 cm (31 in). Although highly resistant to honey fungus, it can still (rarely) be afflicted with Dutch elm disease.

== Uses ==
Its timber is high quality and resistant to decay. Fiber can be extracted from the bark and used to make paper and rope. It is used as a street tree in Wuhan, China. When planted in urban settings in North Carolina, individuals showed signs of distress including crown dieback and cracking bark.

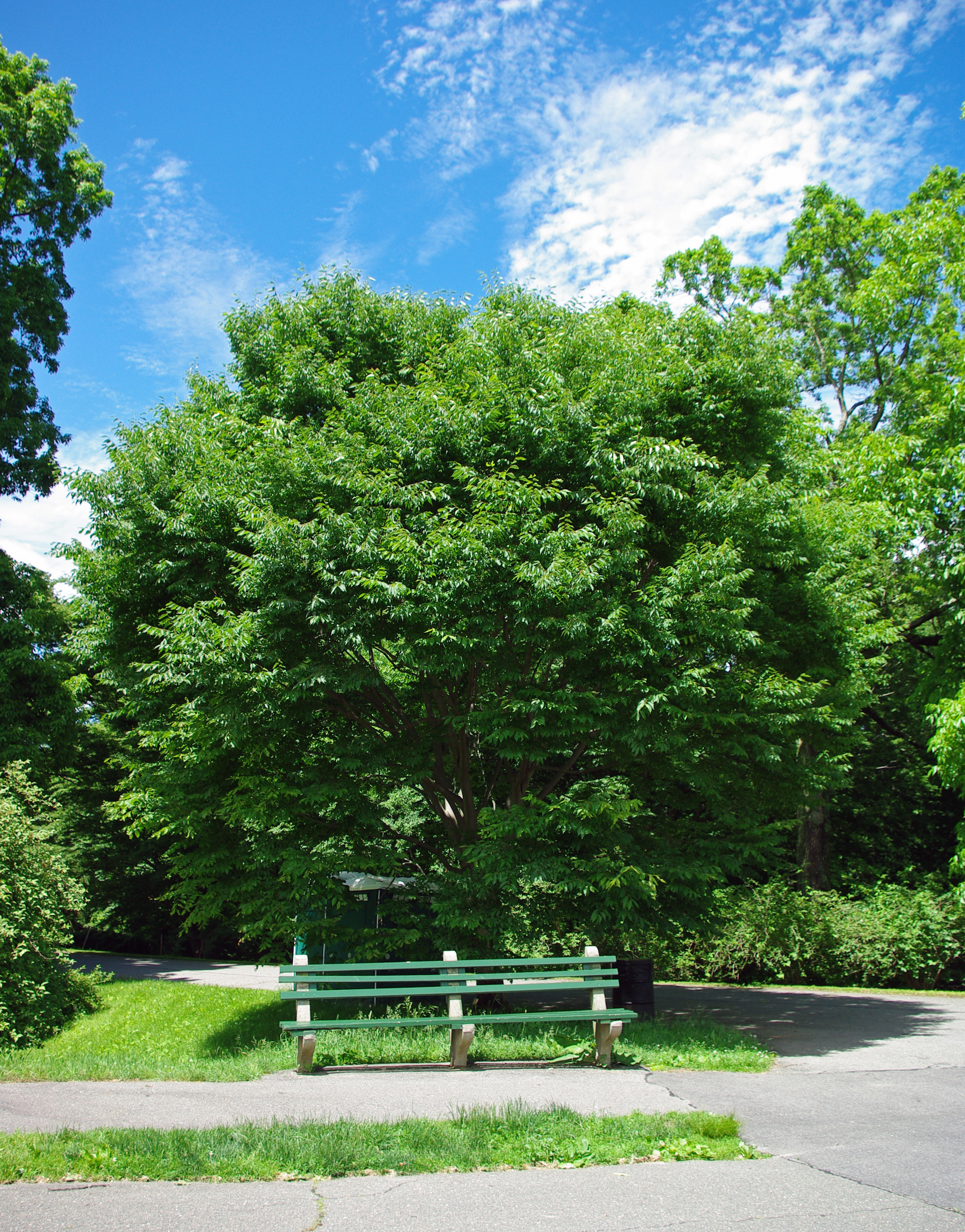
At the Arnold Arboretum

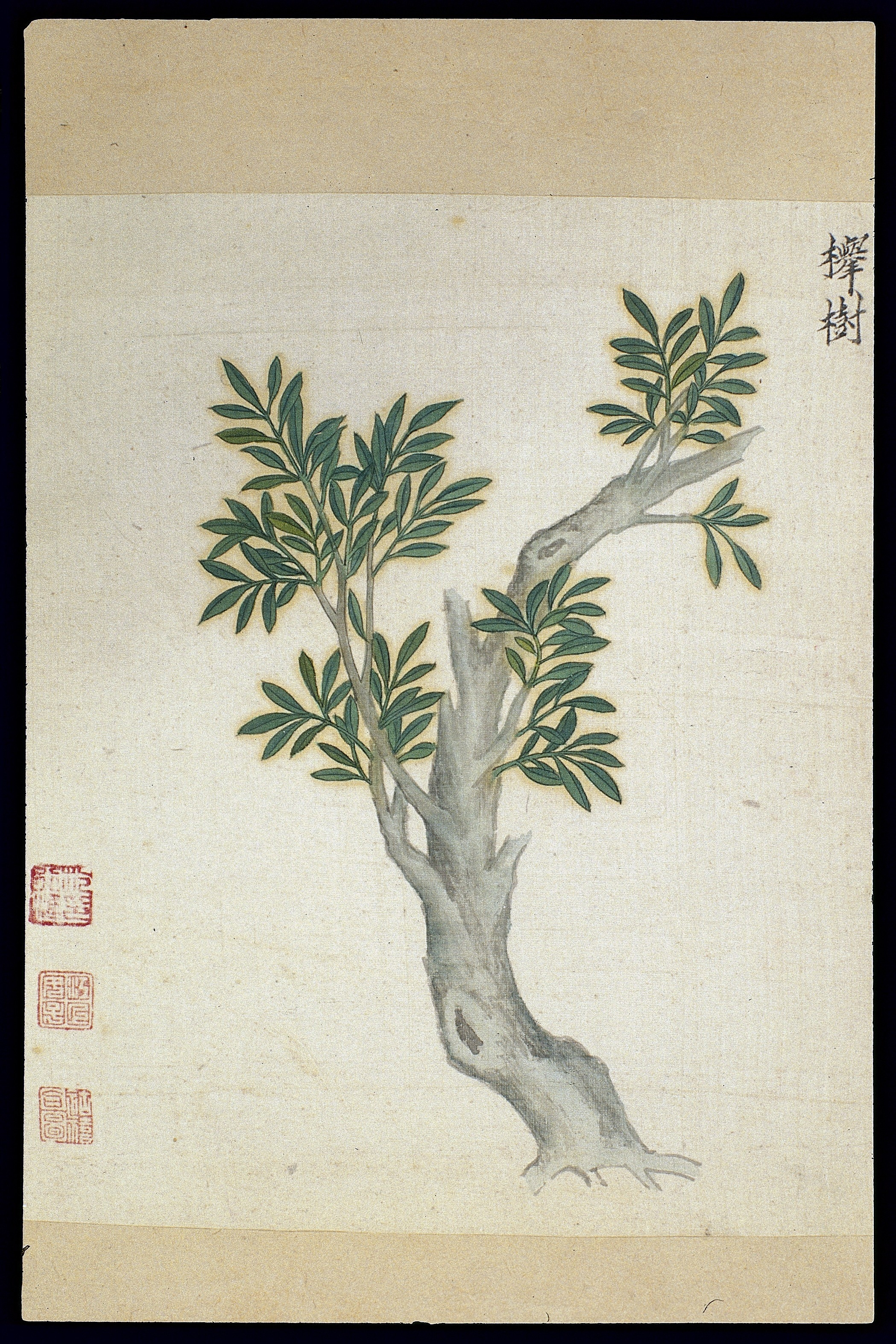
Ming dynasty depiction
