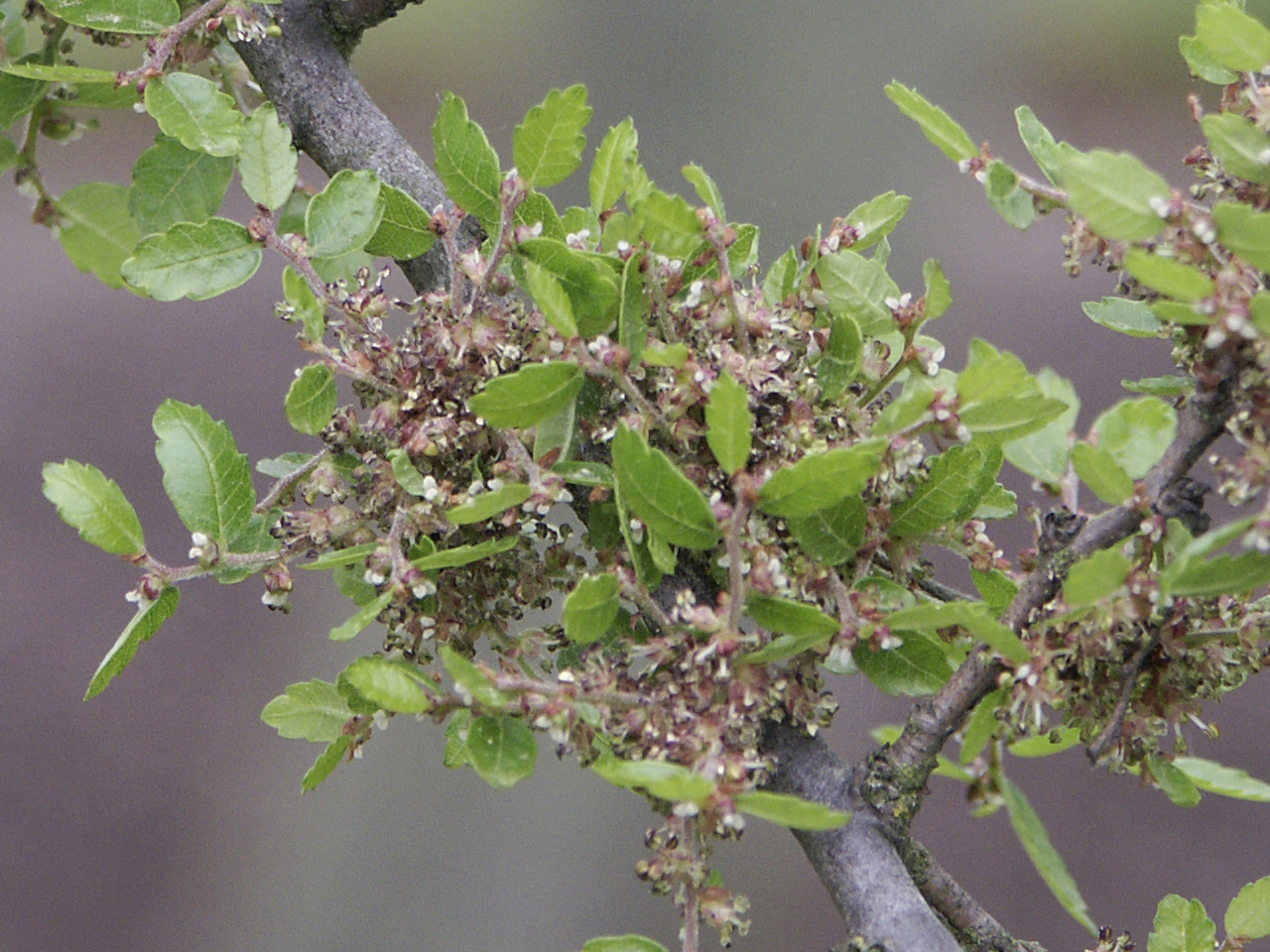

Conservation status
- Near Threatened (IUCN 3.1)

Scientific classification
- Kingdom: Plantae
- Clade: Embryophytes
- Clade: Tracheophytes
- Clade: Spermatophytes
- Clade: Angiosperms
- Clade: Eudicots
- Clade: Rosids
- Order: Rosales
- Family: Ulmaceae
- Genus: Zelkova
- Species: Z. abelicea

Binomial name
- Zelkova abelicea (Lam.) Boiss.

Synonyms
- Planera abelicea (Lam.) Schult. Ulmus abelicea (Lam.) Sm. Zelkova cretica (Sm.) Spach

= Zelkova abelicea =

Species of flowering plant

Zelkova abelicea is a species of tree in the family Ulmaceae. It is referred to by the common names Cretan zelkova, and on Crete proper as abelitsia (αμπελιτσιά). It is endemic to Crete. It is found in small numbers and is classified as Near Threatened on the IUCN red list of endangered species.

== Growth habit ==
It is a medium-sized tree that grows from 3 m (10 ft) to 5 m (16 ft) tall. The tree is strongly branched resulting in a dense, crown shaped habit that extends close to the ground. The leaves are small and green with serrated edges. Z. abelicea produces perfect hermaphroditic flowers which are small and scented, and pollination is therefore thought to be achieved by insects.

This species is capable of suckering, a form of reproduction where new shoots arise from an existing root system rather than from a seed. Natural regeneration by seed is rarely seen. Root cutting seem to show a 50% success rate, though best results may be seen in the cuttings taken from late August. Branch cutting of young shoots also root with moderate success when taken in late mid to late summer. This species is usually found on rocky, mountainous areas at altitudes between 850 and 1,800 m (2,790 and 5,910 ft).

== Shepherd's crook ==
Because of its tough nature, it was formerly the most preferred wood for making the traditional Cretan shepherd's versatile crook Greek: katsouna. Today it is forbidden by law to use Z. abelitsia for making a shepherd's crook, since it is made of an entire young tree.

== Conservation status ==
The International Union for Conservation of Nature Red List of Threatened Species has assessed the species as Near Threatened (NT). The species is threatened by overgrazing, habitat loss, and reduced seed production due to climate change.

== Accessions ==
=== Europe ===
- Icomb Place gardens, as Z. abelicea.

== Sources ==
- Fielding, J. & Turland, N.; Mathew, B. (ed.), 2005. Flowers of Crete. Royal Botanic Gardens, Kew.
- Turland, N. J., Chilton, L. & Press, J. R., 1993. Flora of the Cretan area: annotated checklist & atlas [2nd impression, 1995, with printing errors corrected]. The Natural History Museum and HMSO, London.
- Søndergaard, P. & Egli, B.R.: Zelkova abelicea (Ulmaceae) in Crete: Floristics, Ecology, Propagation and Threats. - Willdenowia 36 (Special Issue): 317-322 - ISSN 0511-9618, copyright 2006 BGBM Berlin-Dahlem available as PDF file
- "Cretan Zelkova (Zelkova abelicea)." Arkive. Wildscreen: Promoting Conservation through Wildlife Imagery. 4 May 2009 <>.
