= Lorenzo Berlèse =

Italian botanist, clergyman and horticulturist (1784–1863)

The Abbe Berlèse (1784 in Campomolino, Italy – August 16, 1863 in Campomolino, Italy) was the greatest camellia scholar of the nineteenth century. He was born and died in Campomolino, Italy. He was ordained priest in the Seminario Vescovile di Ceneda. He lived and worked for circa 40 years in Paris, where he had his own greenhouses. The first edition of his book, published in 1837, began to establish a formal classification system for camellia varieties. He was cofounder (with 400 others) and vice-president of the Société Royale d'Horticulture de Paris the predecessor of the National Horticultural Society of France. He is remembered by the Camellia Berlesiana and Camellia Campomolendina which bear his name.

== External links and sources ==
- Monography of the Genus Camellia Or: An Essay on Its Culture, Description ... by Lorenzo Berlèse, Boston, J. Breck & company, 1838, 102 pages (full text at google books)
- Iconographie du genre Camellia, en trois tomes, (Paris, 1841-1843)
- L'abate L. Berlese biopage in Italian
