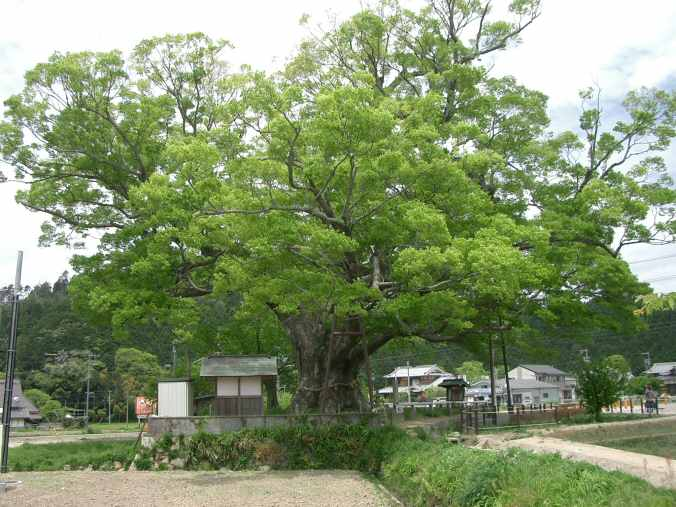
- "Noma Keyaki", a 1,000-year-old keyaki in Nose near Osaka in Japan, 25 m tall, 11.95 m trunk circumference; second-largest known specimen

Conservation status
- Near Threatened (IUCN 3.1)

Scientific classification
- Kingdom: Plantae
- Clade: Tracheophytes
- Clade: Angiosperms
- Clade: Eudicots
- Clade: Rosids
- Order: Rosales
- Family: Ulmaceae
- Genus: Zelkova
- Species: Z. serrata

Binomial name
- Zelkova serrata (Thunb.) Makino

= Zelkova serrata =

Species of tree

Zelkova serrata (Japanese zelkova, Japanese elm, keyaki, or keaki; Japanese: 欅, romanized: keyaki or 槻, tsuki; simplified Chinese: 榉树; traditional Chinese: 櫸樹; pinyin: jǔshù; Korean: 느티나무; RR: neutinamu) is a species of the genus Zelkova native to Japan, Korea, eastern China and Taiwan. It is often grown as an ornamental tree, and used in bonsai. There are two varieties, Zelkova serrata var. serrata in Japan and mainland eastern Asia, and Zelkova serrata var. tarokoensis (Hayata) Li on Taiwan which differs from the type in its smaller leaves with less deeply cut serration on the margins.

== Description ==
Zelkova serrata is a medium-sized deciduous tree usually growing to 30 m (98 ft) tall. It is characterized by a short trunk dividing into many upright and erect spreading stems forming a broad, round-topped head. The tree grows rapidly when young though the growth rate slows to medium upon middle age and maturity.

It has alternately arranged leaves growing to 5 cm (2 in) long and broad. The leaves themselves are simple and ovate to oblong-ovate with serrated or crenate margins, to which the tree owes its specific epithet serrata. The leaves are acuminate or apiculate, rounded or subcordate at the base, and contain 8–14 pairs of veins. The leaves are rough on top and glabrous or nearly glabrous on the underside. They are green to dark green in spring and throughout the summer, changing to yellows, oranges and reds in autumn. The petioles are 2–5 mm (1/16–3/16 in) long.

Zelkova serrata is monoecious. It develops flowers in spring with the leaves. Buds are ovoid, acutish, with many imbricate, dark brown scales. They diverge at a 45-degree angle from the stem. The staminate flowers are shortly pedicellate and approximately 3 mm in diameter, clustered in the axils of the lower leaves. The pistillate flowers are solitary or few in axils of the upper leaves, sessile and usually about 1.5 mm in diameter. The flowers are yellow-green, not showy, and occur in tight groups along new stems. They give rise to small, ovate, wingless drupes that ripen in late summer to autumn. The drupe is green maturing to brown, subsessile and 2.5 to 3.5 mm (3/32 to 1/8 in) in diameter.

To identify Zelkova serrata, one would look for a short main trunk, low branching and a vase-shaped habit. The twigs are slender with small, dark conical buds in a zigzag pattern. The branches are usually glabrous. The bark is grayish white to grayish brown and either smooth with lenticels or exfoliating in patches to reveal orange inner bark. The branchlets are brownish-purple to brown.

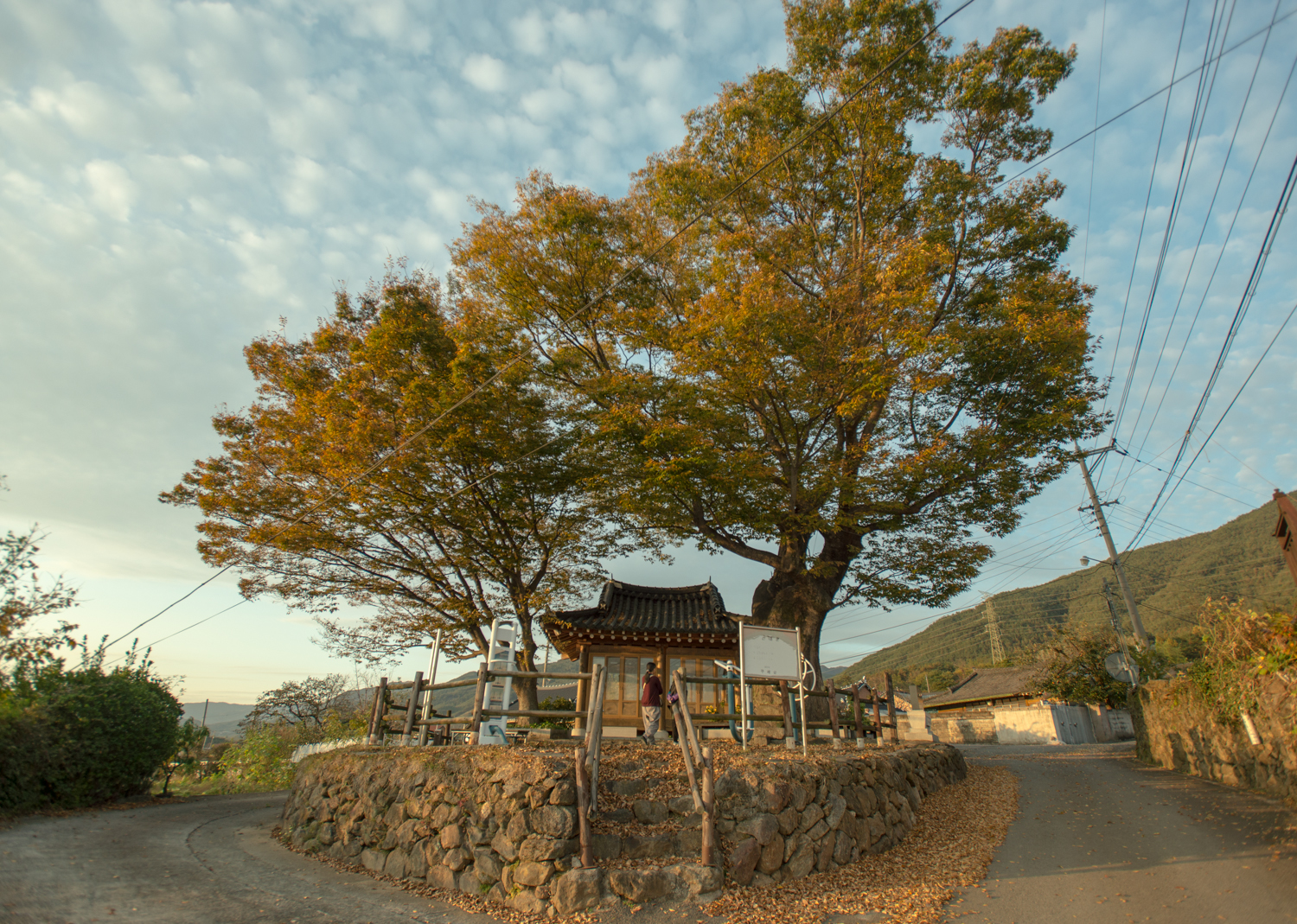
A Zelkova 'Dangsan Namu' in Suhan Village, Suwol-ri, Gurye-gun, Korea

== Threats ==
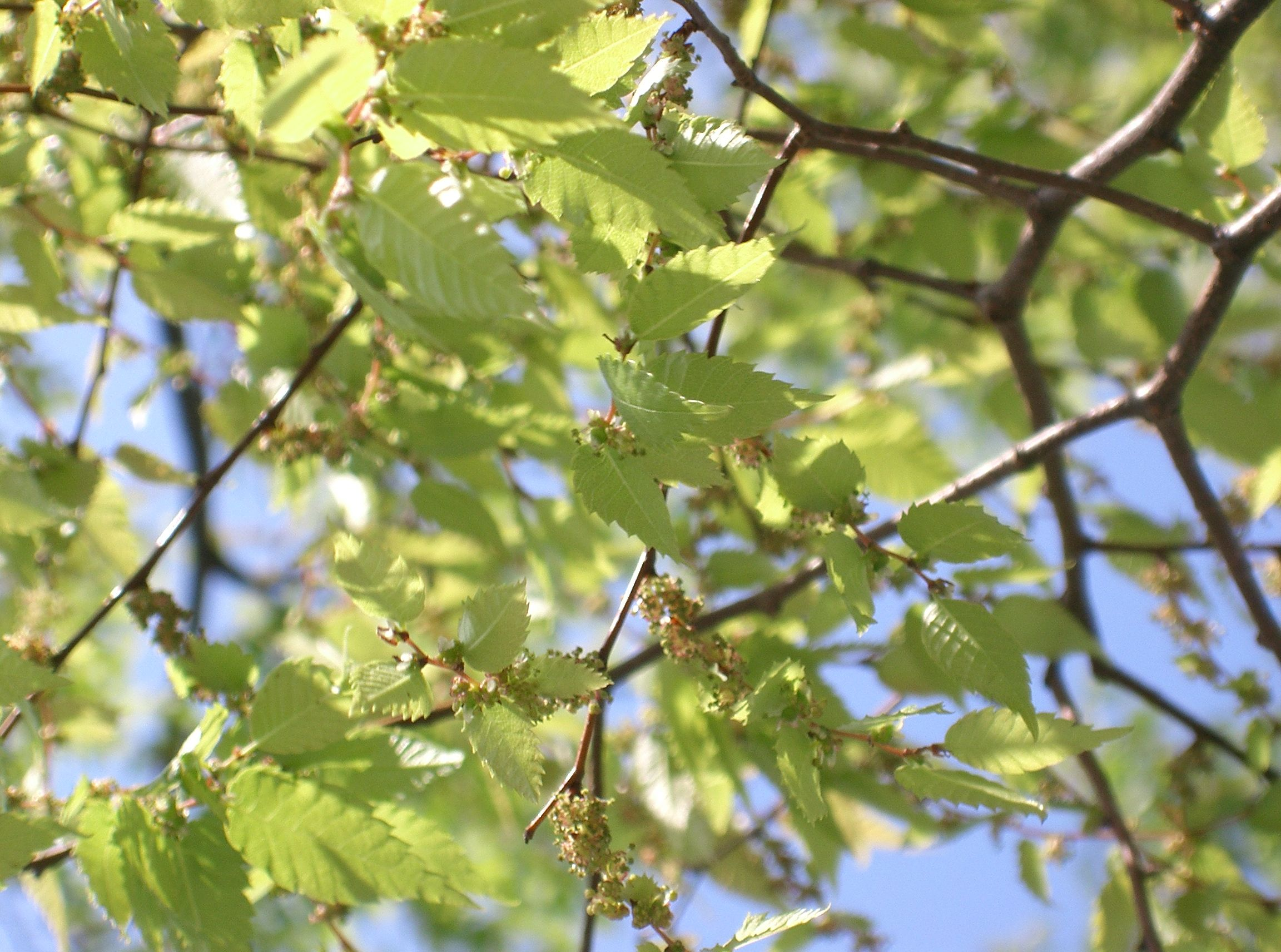
Foliage and flowers in spring

The threats to this tree include colder temperature, which often result in twig dieback. It is highly resistant to Dutch elm disease, which makes it a good replacement tree for American elm. Zelkova serrata is similar in appearance to the elms, though may be distinguished by its unwinged fruit and leaves which are symmetrical rather than uneven at their base. Zelkova serrata also shows good resistance to elm leaf beetle and Japanese beetle.

The tree is prone to fungus Griphosphaerioma zelkovicola which was first observed in Japan on the bark of Zelkova serrata trees in 2003.

== Cultivation ==
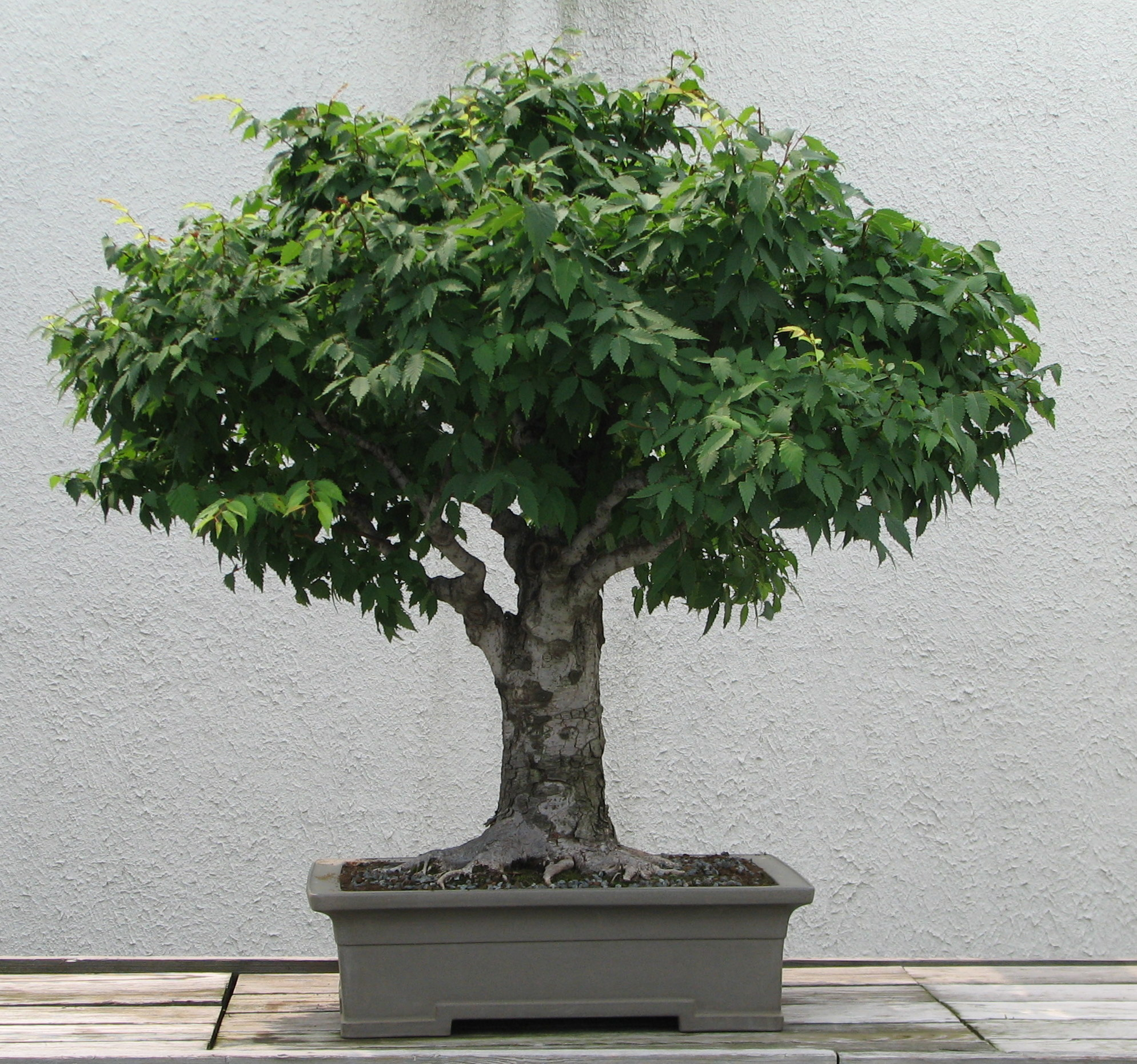
Zelkova serrata bonsai from the United States National Arboretum

Zelkova serrata is planted as a lawn or park tree for its attractive bark, leaf color and vase shape. It provides good shade and has an easy fall cleanup. It is easy to transport, and often available in burlap form. It is also commonly used for bonsai; its attractive shape and colors make it a popular choice for the art. It is often grown as an ornamental tree, both in its native area and in Europe and North America. The first cultivation outside of Asia was by Philipp Franz von Siebold, who introduced it to the Netherlands in 1830. Recently, it has been planted as a "street tree" in New York City and Philadelphia. In the UK it has gained the Royal Horticultural Society's Award of Garden Merit.

Within the United Kingdom, the Royal Horticultural Society's Plantfinder currently lists 38 suppliers for the pure species and associated varieties.

This tree requires full to partial sun and prefers moist, well-drained soils. A fertilizer rich in potassium and nitrogen encourages new vegetation and floral buds. It is adaptable and tolerant of heat, little water, nutrient-poor soils and various pH. It should be periodically thinned to allow light into the inner canopy. Zelkova Serrata is propagated by seeds, rooted stem cuttings and grafting. The seeds germinate without pretreatment, though the percentage is better when stratified at 5 °C (41 °F) for 60 days. Because germination requires stratification, the seed is best sown early in the year. To ensure survival it may be necessary to pot the tree and grow it in a greenhouse for its first winter. It may be reintroduced into its permanent habitat after the final frost.

Numerous cultivars have been selected, including:

- 'Fuiri Keyaki' (variegated leaves)
- 'Goblin' (dwarf)
- 'Goshiki' (variegated leaves)
- 'Green Vase' (tall, narrow crown)
- 'Green Veil' (pendulous branchlets)
- 'Iruma Sango' (fastigiate)
- 'Nire Keyaki' (semi-dwarf)
- 'Pulverulenta' (variegated leaves)
- 'Spring Grove' (upright crown)
- 'Variegata' (variegated leaves)
- 'Village Green' (grows more rapidly than ordinary seedlings and develops a straight smooth trunk. Hardier than trees of Japanese origin)
- 'Variegata' (weak growing, small leaved form with a narrow white rim around the margin of the leaf)
- 'Parkview' (selection with good vase-shape, size similar to species)
- 'Urban Ruby' (red autumn colour)
- 'Musashino' (tightly columnar in form, fast growing)
- 'Ogon' (bright green-yellow almost gold colored leaves all year, with a contrasting bronze colored bark)

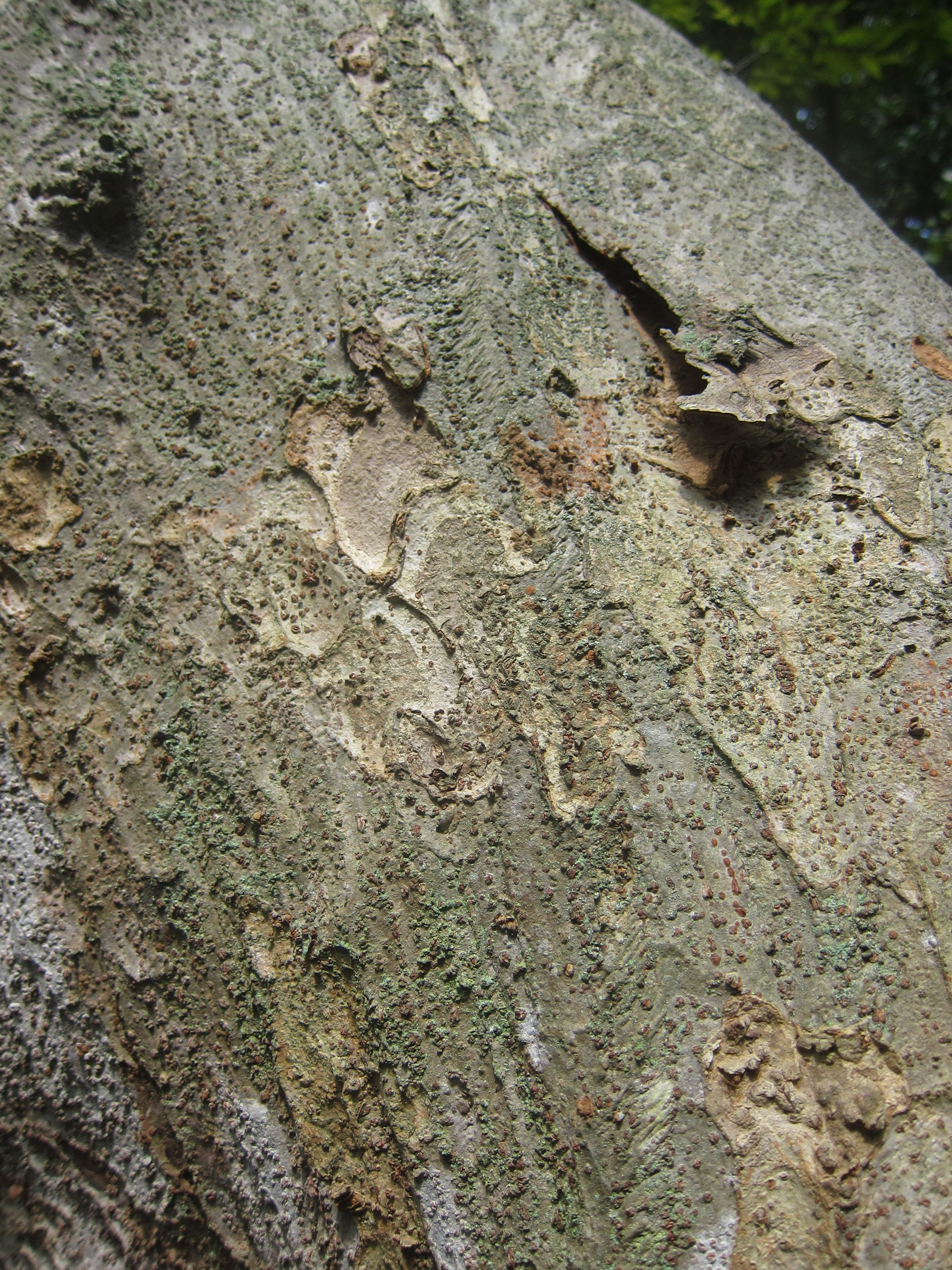
Bark of mature Japanese zelkova

It has also hybridised with Zelkova carpinifolia in Europe, the hybrid being named Zelkova × verschaffeltii.

== Uses ==
Keyaki wood is valued in Japan and used often for furniture, such as tansu, as well as being considered the ideal wood for the creation of taiko drums.

== In culture ==
In Korea, Zelkova serrata has been considered a symbol of protection for villages since ancient times, and can still be found planted at central points in cities, towns and villages around the country. The trees often stand next to small pavilions, serving both as shaded informal gathering points, and spaces for traditional rituals and ceremonies involving prayer and offerings to the tree. The oldest of these trees are estimated to be in excess of 1,000 years in age, and are protected as natural monuments by Korean law. In 2013, the Korea Forest Research Institute announced a project to clone the zelkova, pine, and ginkgo trees that are identified as natural monuments, so their lineage will not be lost in case of disaster or death due to age.

According to data investigated by Korea Forest Service in 1989, the largest number of trees over 500 years old were specimens of Zelkova serrata, among which more than ten have been registered as Natural Monuments of Korea.

The tree is a symbol of a number of Japanese cities and prefectures: Saitama Prefecture, Miyagi Prefecture, Fukushima Prefecture, Fukushima-shi, Abiko-shi, Tachikawa-shi, Yokohama-shi, Machida City in Tokyo Metropolis District, Takatsuki City and more.

== Gallery ==
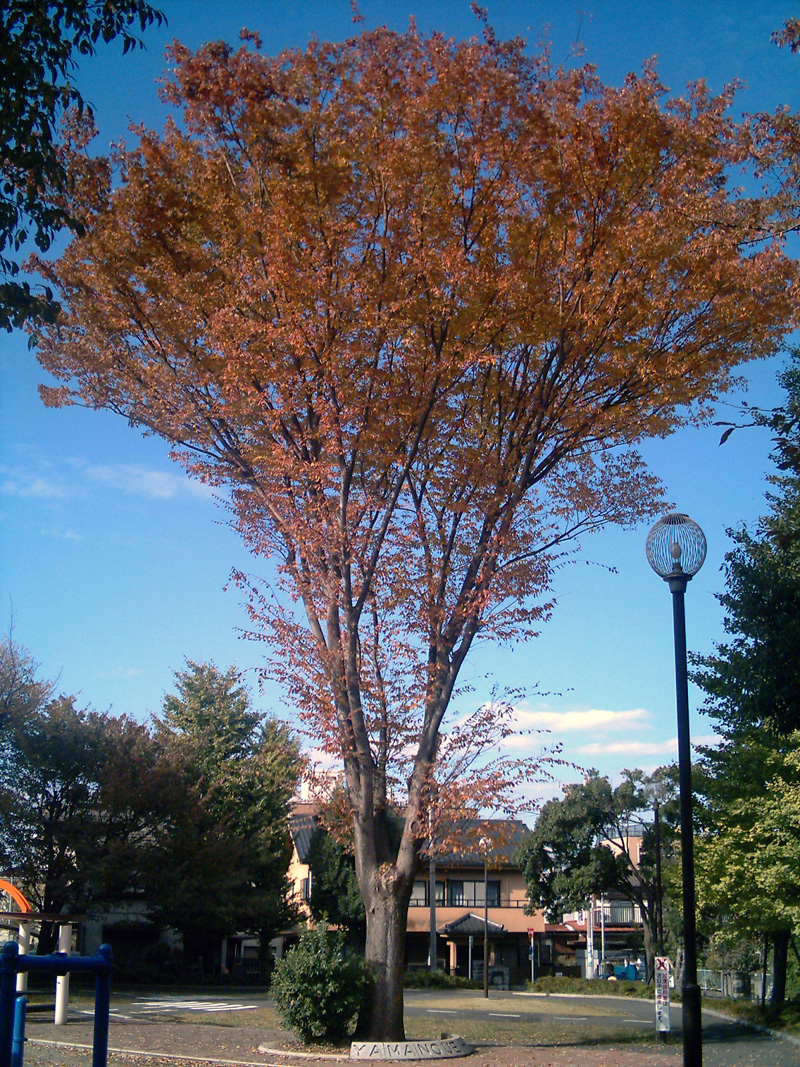
Autumn colour, November, Saitama Prefecture, Japan

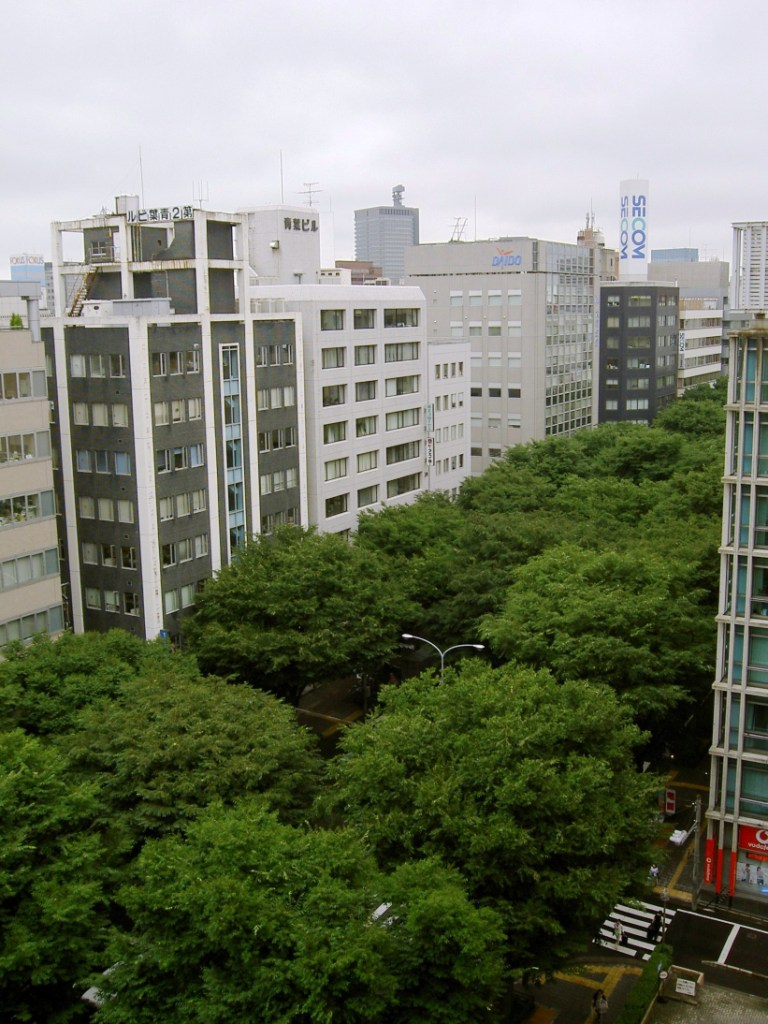
Trees lining an avenue in Sendai, Japan

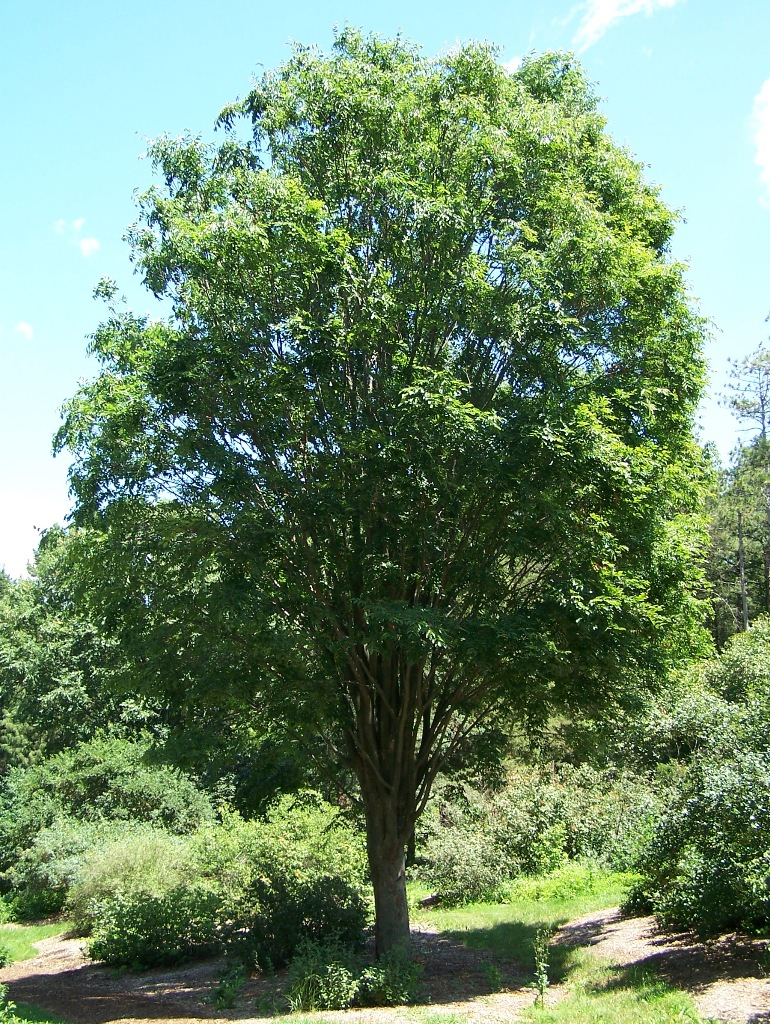
Morton Arboretum
acc. 10-54-1

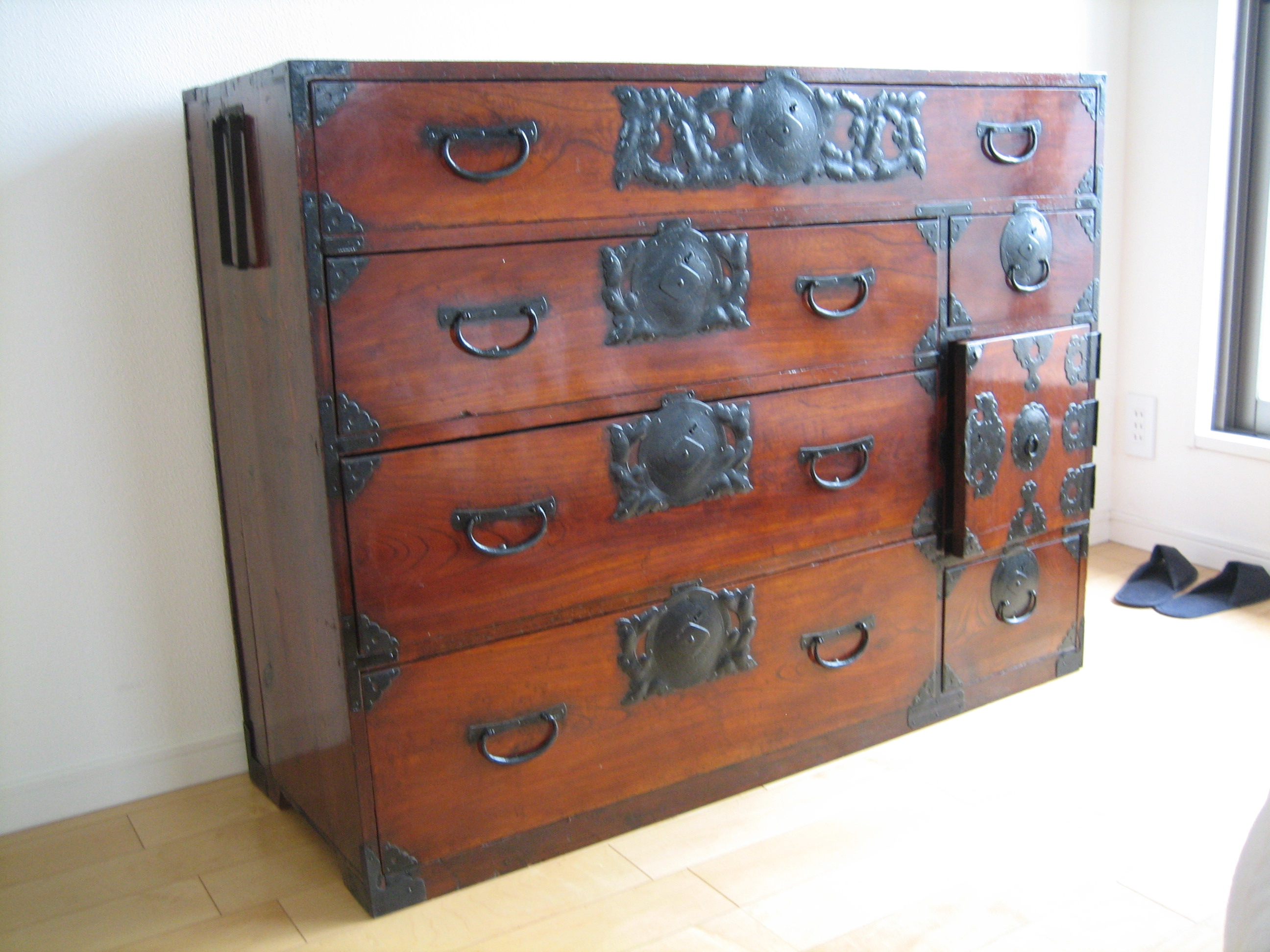
A Japanese Sendai-dansu for kimono made from keyaki wood

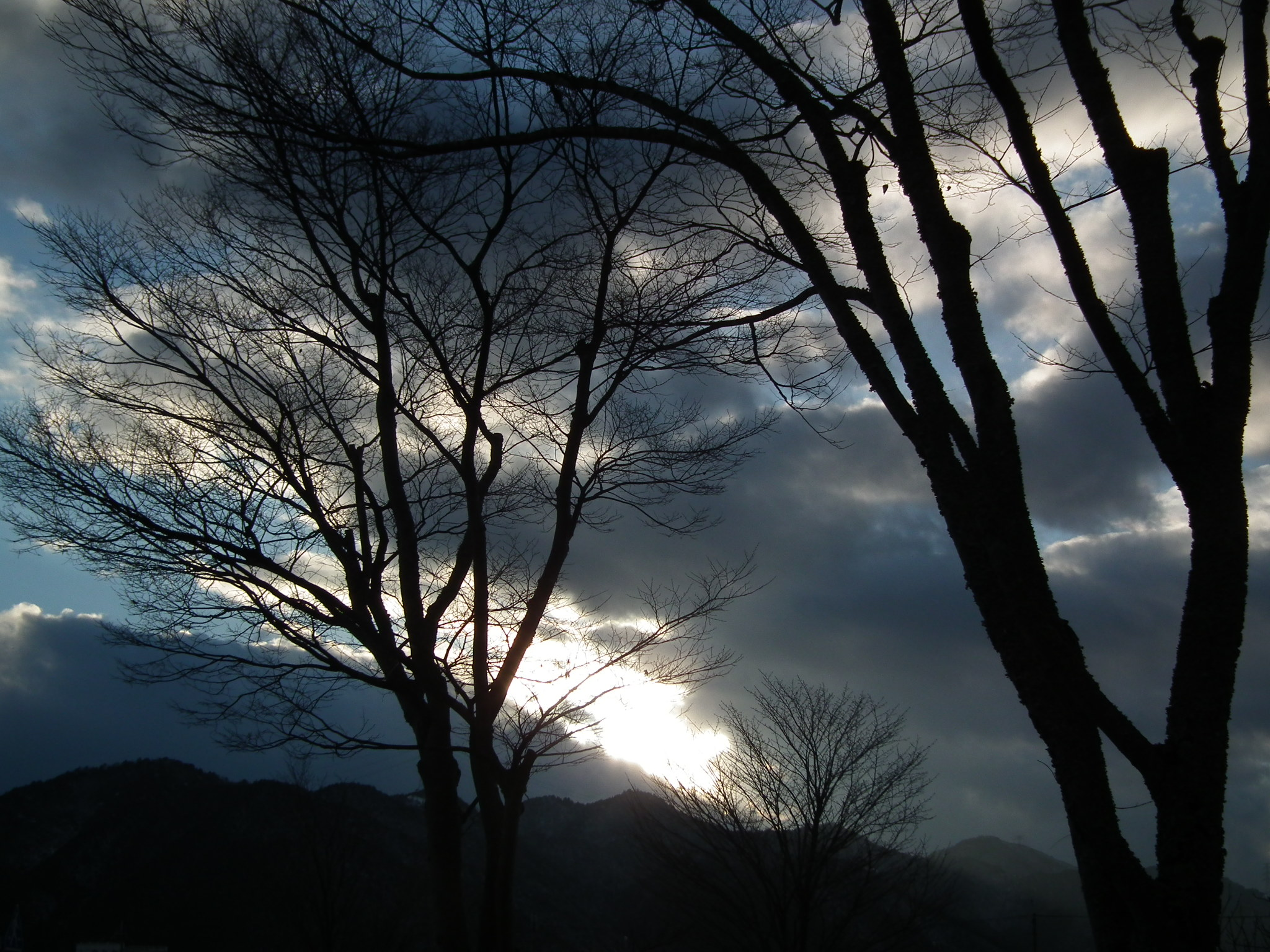
Sasayama, Hyogo in the winter

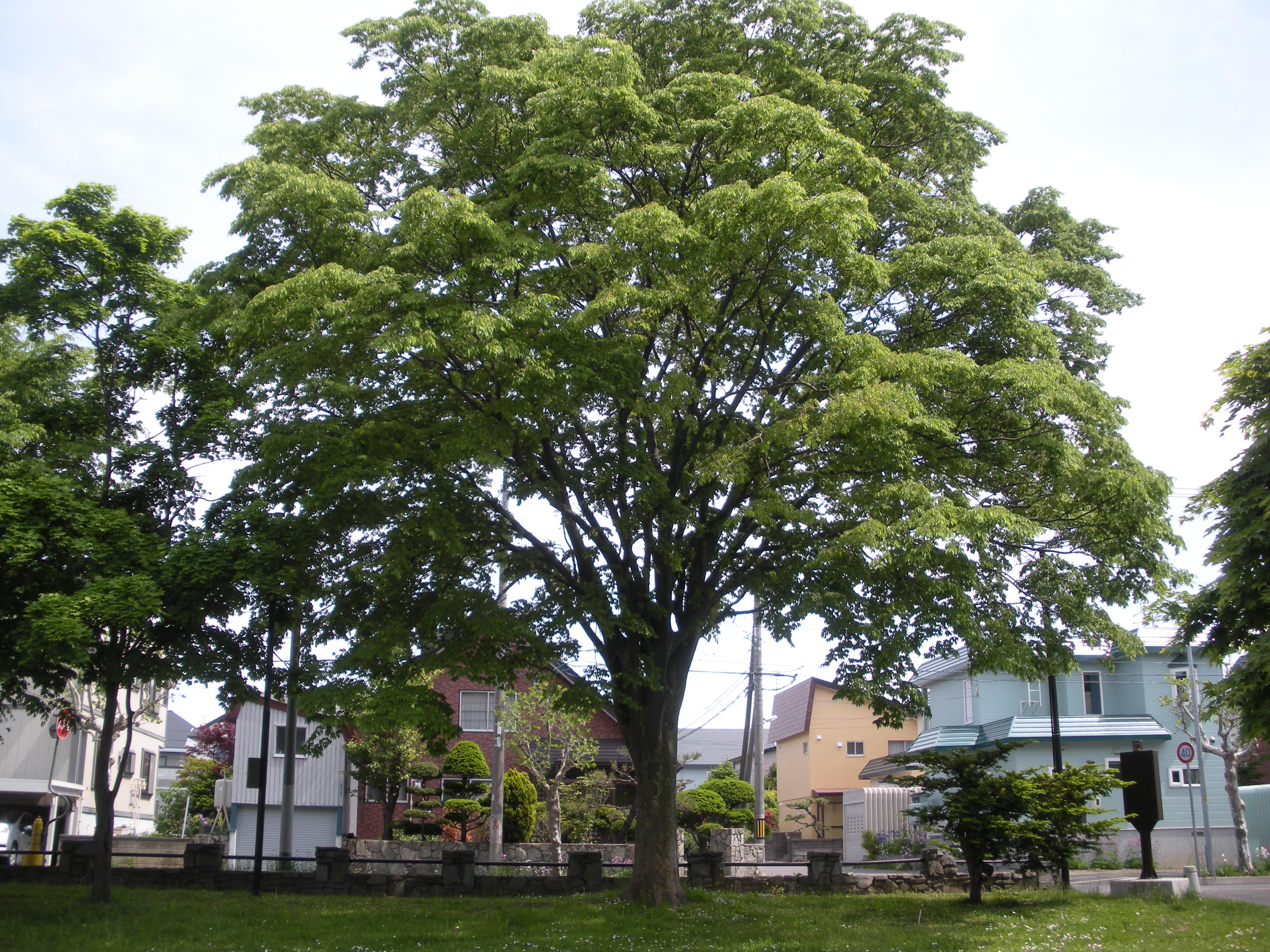
An example of a mature tree in Ebetsu, Hokkaido
