= Leopold Dippel =

German botanist

- Born: 4 August 1827; Lauterecken, Germany
- Died: 4 March 1914 (aged 86); Darmstadt, Germany
- Education: Academy of Forestry
- Known for: Botany; Dendrology
- Spouse: Sophie Fried (m. 1851)
- Scientific career
- Fields: Botany; Dendrology
- Workplaces: Technische Universität Darmstadt; Chemical-Technical School
- Author abbrev. (botany): Dippel

Georg Heinrich Leopold Dippel (4 August 1827 – 4 March 1914) was a German botanist. He was the son of a royal Bavarian forester, Carl Friedrich Peter Dippel, and Sussanna Purpus. He attended schools in Kaiserslautern and Zweibrücken. From 1845, he studied at the Academy of Forestry in Aschaffenburg, until he graduated in 1848. During his time there he was a member of the Munich Corps Hubertia fraternity. He continued his studies in Jena under the tutelage of Matthias Jacob Schleiden. Under him, he learned more extensively about botany and pioneered his work in microscopy and his research on the structure of plant's bodies. From July 1869, he worked at the Technische Universität Darmstadt, as a professor of Botany and Zoology, Botany, and Cellular Histology. His interests turned towards Dendrology at this point. He brought many foreign trees and shrubs, mostly collected by his first cousin Carl Albert Purpus in North America and Mexico, and sent them to Germany. He was the rector of the Technical University of Darmstadt from 1870 to 1871 and the Dean of the Chemical-Technical School from 1882 to 1887. He retired at the end of the summer semester in 1896.

== Honors ==
- 1863: Prize of the French Academy of Sciences.
- 1864/65: rates of the Dutch Society for Experimental Science.
- 1865: Honorary doctorate from the Faculty of Arts of the University of Bonn.
- 1914: Honorary Member of the Royal Microscopical Society, London.

== Works ==
- The microscope and its application Volume I (1867) Volume II (1869)
- Handbook of Dendrology - description of domestic and cultivated outdoor trees and shrubs. For botanists, gardeners and foresters (1889-1893 Part I to III) doi: 10.5962 / bhl.title.12978 doi: 10.5962 / bhl.title.20463
- Participation in "The Whole Science." Third revised and enriched edition. Printed and published by GD Baedeker Essen 1873.
