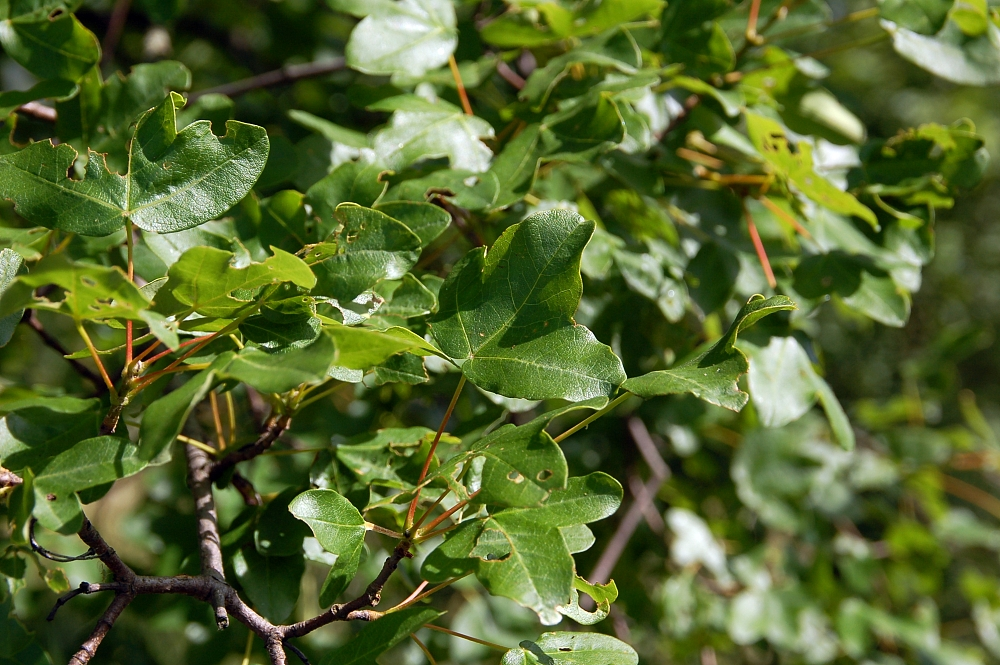
- Foliage

Conservation status
- Least Concern (IUCN 3.1)

Scientific classification
- Kingdom: Plantae
- Clade: Tracheophytes
- Clade: Angiosperms
- Clade: Eudicots
- Clade: Rosids
- Order: Sapindales
- Family: Sapindaceae
- Genus: Acer
- Section: Acer sect. Acer
- Series: Acer ser. Monspessulana
- Species: A. monspessulanum

Binomial name
- Acer monspessulanum L.
- Distribution map

Synonyms
- List: Acer commutatum C.Presl; Acer denticulatum Dippel; Acer heckianum Asch. ex Wesm.; Acer hungaricum Borbás; Acer illyricum J.Jacq.; Acer liburnicum (Pax) Dippel; Acer monspessulanum subsp. athoum (Bornm. & Sint.) Lippold ex F.K.Mey.; Acer monspessulanum var. athoum Bornm. & Sint.; Acer monspessulanum subf. cruciatum Jovan.; Acer monspessulanum subf. obtentum Jovan.; Acer monspessulanum subf. tenuilobum Jovan.; Acer rectangulum Dulac; Acer talyschense Radde-Fom.; Acer trifolium Duhamel; Acer trilobatum Lam.; Acer trilobum Moench

= Acer monspessulanum =

Species of maple

Acer monspessulanum, the Montpellier maple, is a species of maple native to the Mediterranean region from Morocco and Portugal in the west, to Turkey, Syria, Lebanon, and Israel/Palestine in the east, and north to the Jura Mountains in France and the Eifel in Germany.

== Description ==
Acer monspessulanum is a medium-sized deciduous tree or densely branched shrub that grows to a height of 10 to 15 metres (33 to 49 ft) (rarely to 20 m or 66 ft). The trunk is up to 75 centimetres (30 in) in diameter, with smooth, dark grey bark on young trees, becoming finely fissured on old trees. Among similar maples is most easily distinguished by its small three-lobed leaves, 3–6 cm long and 3–7 cm wide, glossy dark green, sometimes a bit leathery, and with a smooth margin, with a 2–5 cm petiole. The leaves fall very late in autumn, typically in November.

The flowers are produced in spring, in pendulous, yellow to white corymbs 2–3 cm long. The samaras are 2–3 cm long with rounded nutlets.

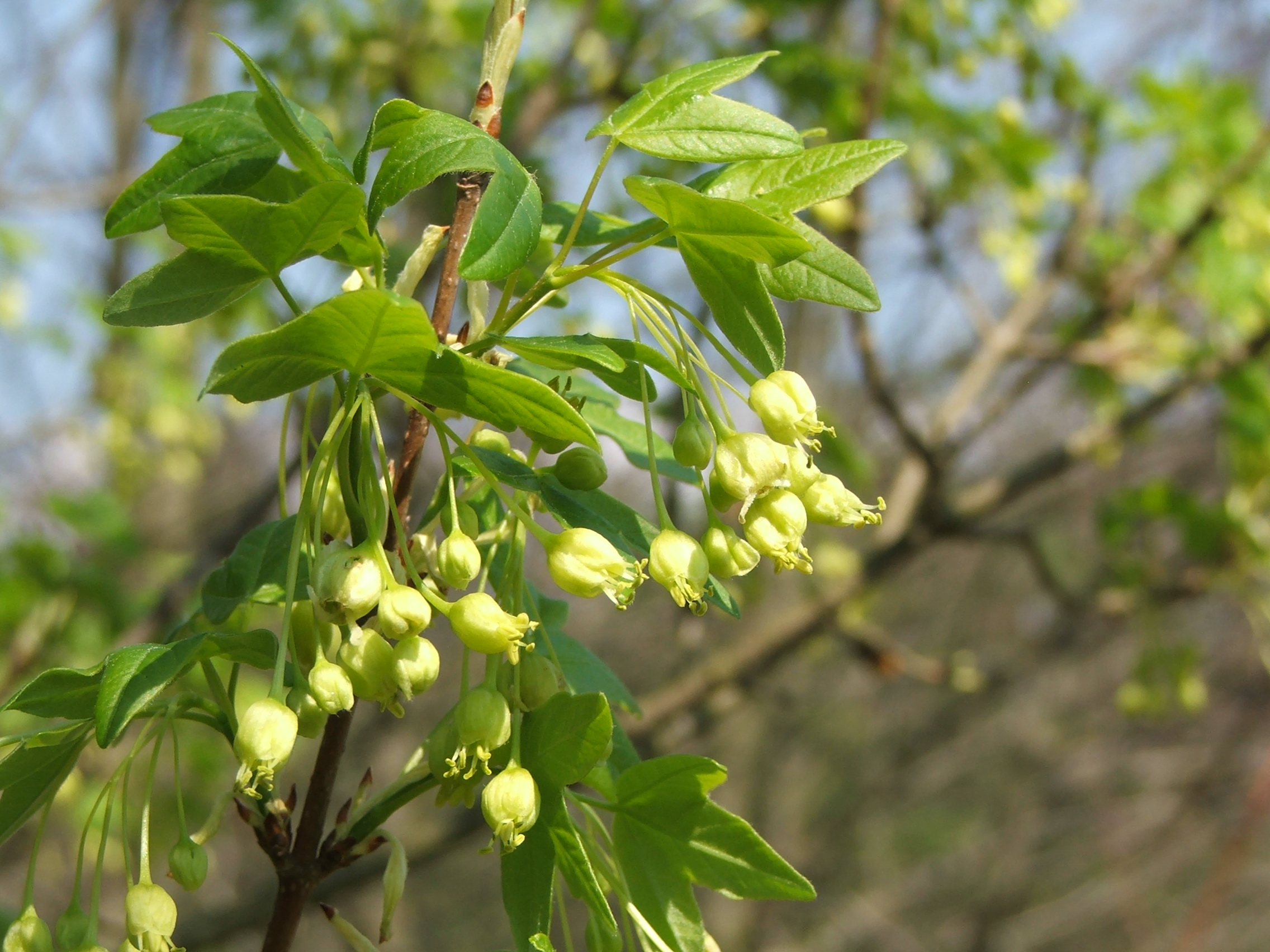
Flowers and young leaves in spring

=== Subspecies ===
It is variable, and a number of subspecies and varieties have been described, but few are widely accepted as distinct. The most widely accepted as distinct is Acer monspessulanum subsp. microphyllum (Boiss.) Bornmueller, from Turkey and Lebanon, with smaller leaves not over 3 cm broad.

The species can be mistaken for Acer campestre (field maple), another maple native to Europe, from which it is best distinguished by the clear sap in the leaves (milk-white in field maple), and the much narrower angle between the samara wings.

Orange seed pods hang from a branch of a Montpellier maple tree seen in Siruana, Spain (2026).

== Cultivation ==
Among maples not endemic to Japan, A. monspessulanum (and the similar A. campestre) are popular among bonsai enthusiasts. In both cases, the smallish leaves and shrubby habit of the maple respond well to techniques to encourage leaf reduction and ramification. These bonsai have an appearance distinct from those created from maples such as Acer palmatum whose leaves are more frilly and translucent.

Otherwise, Acer monspessulanum is rarely seen in cultivation outside of arboreta. In the United States, a mature specimen may be seen at Arnold Arboretum in Boston, Massachusetts, and the Fort Worth Botanic Gardens in Fort Worth, Texas.

A specimen can also be found in the arboretum of the Montreal Botanical Gardens.
