= Ulmus × hollandica 'Etrusca' =

Elm cultivar

- Hybrid parentage: U. glabra × U. minor
- Cultivar: 'Etrusca'
- Origin: England

The hybrid cultivar Ulmus × hollandica 'Etrusca' was first mentioned by Nicholson in Kew Hand-List Trees & Shrubs 2: 139. 1896, as U. montana (: glabra) var. etrusca, but without description. The tree at Kew, judged by Henry to be "not distinct enough to deserve a special name", was later identified as of hybrid origin, U. glabra × U. minor 'Plotii', by Melville.

== Description ==
The Kew specimen was a small tree with ascending branches. Herbarium specimens show oval or near orbicular leaves (the latter with an abrupt, longish tip, without tapering), and a short petiole.

== Etymology ==
The tree was possibly named for its resemblance to Tuscan cypress. Melville photographed a mature, roughly conical elm at Bulby, Lincolnshire, labelling the photograph U. glabra × U. plotii [:U.minor 'Plotii'], but the tree is otherwise unconnected with 'Etrusca'.

== Cultivation ==
'Etrusca' was present in The Hague in the 1930s. No specimens are known to survive.

== Synonymy ==
- Ulmus montana (: glabra) var. etrusca: Nicholson in Kew Hand-List Trees & Shrubs 2: 139. 1896.
