= Guy Messenger =

English botanist (1920–1993)

Kenneth Guy Messenger (27 February 1920 – 25 November 1993) was an English botanist best known for his research in Rutland Flora, his interest in elm trees, and highlighting the loss of plot elms.

Guy Messenger taught biology at Uppingham School from 1949 to 1980. He was a council member of the Botanical Society of the British Isles and also the Leicestershire and Rutland Trust for Nature Conservation.

In addition to botanical research, he had an interest in Cartography and was a member of the Charles Close Society for the Study of Ordnance Survey Maps. Cambridge University Library's Map Department received a large donation of Ordnance Survey maps from his estate.

== Publications ==
- Messenger, Guy (1971). Flora of Rutland. Leicester (New Walk, Leicester LE1 6TD: Leicester Museums and Art Gallery. ISBN 978-0-9500435-3-1.
