= Ulmus aff. 'Plotii' =

Elm cultivar

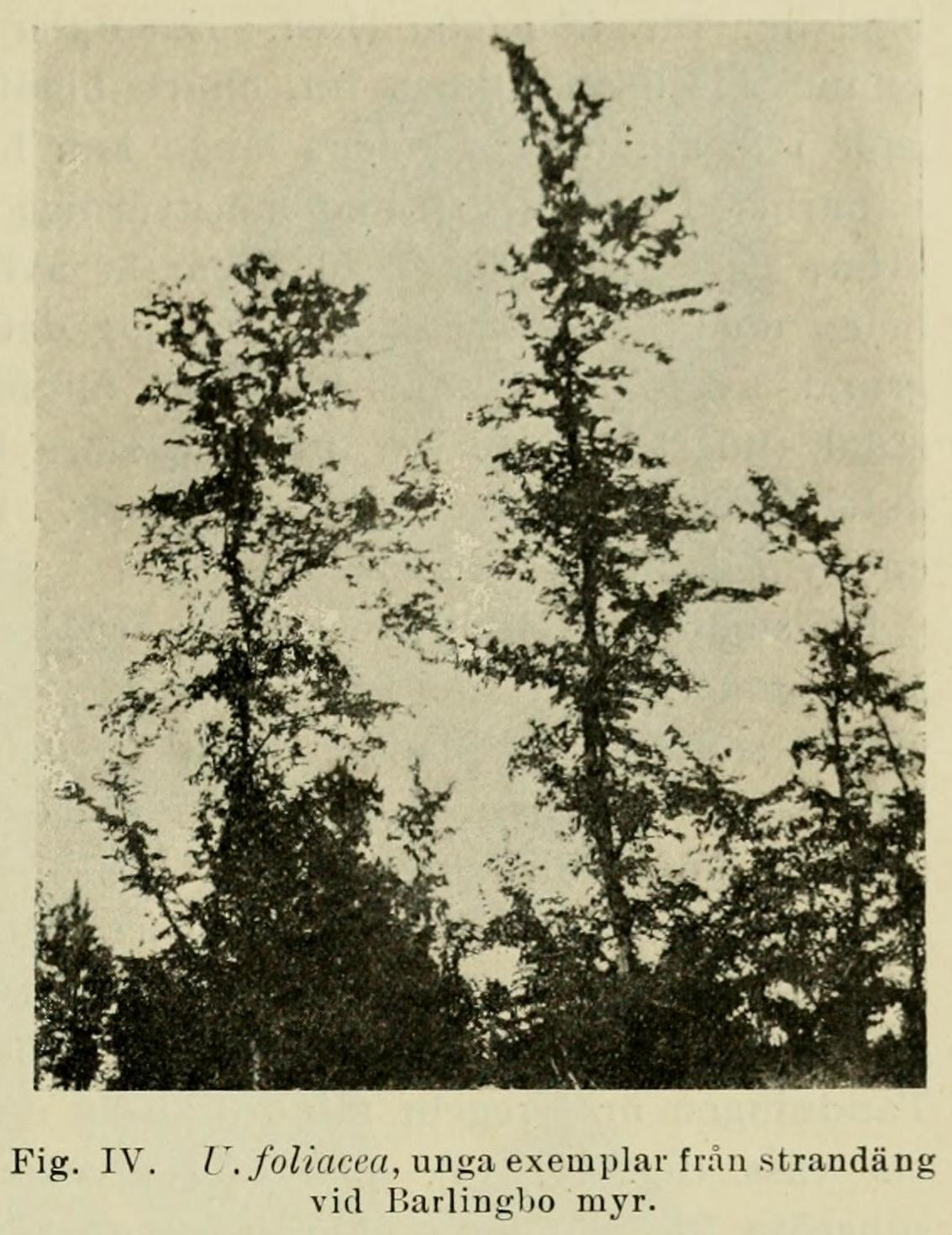
- Young Plot-like field elms, Barlingbo, Gotland, Sweden
- Genus: Ulmus
- Cultivar: Ulmus aff. 'Plotii'
- Origin: Europe

Ulmus aff. 'Plotii', or 'pseudo-Plotii', was the name first used by Melville in the 1940s (in the form aff. plotii) for elms in England, of various genotypes, that resemble but do not completely match the 'type'-tree, U. minor 'Plotii'. It was taken up again, with name adapted, following Dr Max Coleman's findings about Plot Elm (2000) and his paper on British elms (2002).

Melville's brief description, at the end of a paragraph on Plot Elm in a 1948 paper, of "a second small-leaved elm, as yet unnamed, found in the lower Thames Valley and East Anglia", that "shares some of the curious features of the Plot Elm but lacks its graceful habit", may be a reference to his aff. 'Plotii'.

Plot-like field elms have also been observed in U. minor fringe areas outside England.

== Description ==
Elms of the aff. 'Plotii' group "are very close to Plot Elm and have a number of characteristics of the 'type', but their crowns are too broad and regular to match 'true Plot'." They are characterised by some or all of the following diagnostic features: a mature crown of unilateral habit; short shoots that produce more than five leaves in a flush; subequal cordate leaf base; and red club-shaped glandular hairs on leaf surface.

== Pests and diseases ==
The trees are susceptible to Dutch elm disease, but as they produce abundant root-suckers immature specimens probably survive in their areas of origin.

== Cultivation ==
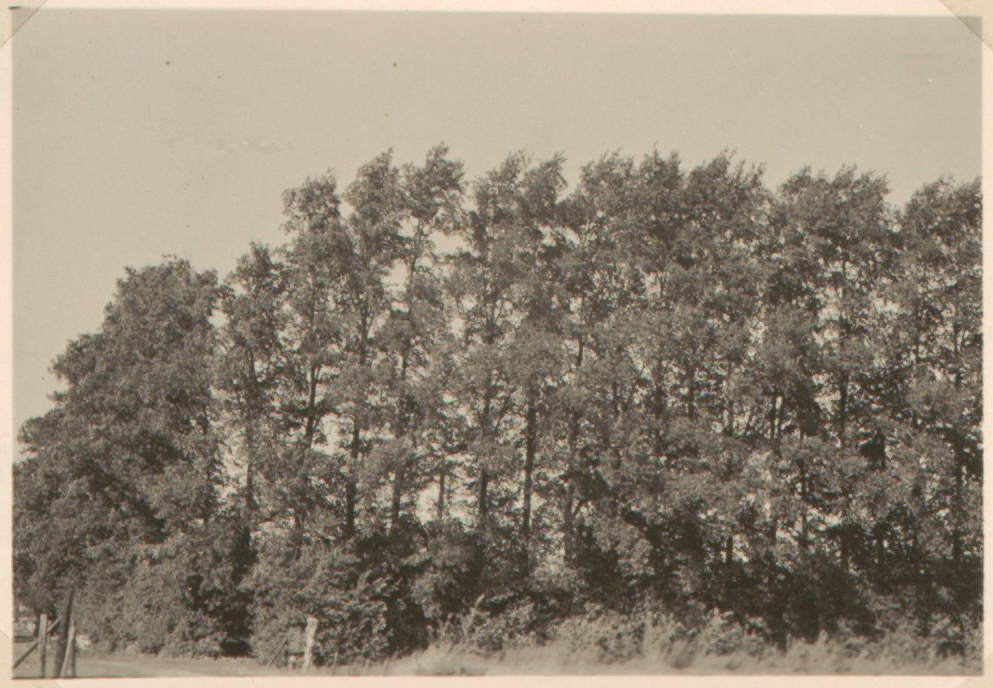
Plot-like elms at Abbekinderen, Zeeland, the Netherlands, 1952, conjectured by Touw as U. minor × U. plotii (1958)

A few Plot-like field elms have entered cultivation (see 'Accessions' below).

Two trees formerly labelled U. minor subsp. minor × U. minor var. lockii, and referred to in Coleman (2000) as 'pseudo-Plotii', that stand (2025) in the Royal Botanic Garden, Edinburgh, have been identified on the RBGE database as U. minor 'Umbraculifera Gracilis'. An elm cultivar of the same clone and similar age, also formerly known as U. aff. 'Plotii', stands on Whitehouse Loan, Bruntsfield Links, Edinburgh.

== Hybrids ==
This group of elms is likely to hybridize in the wild both with wych elm and with U. minor.

== Accessions ==
- Wakehurst Place Garden, Wakehurst Place, UK, as U. plotii. Acc. no. 1977–6692 (ex. Tedstone de la Mere SO692587. Melville ref. 7677), collected by Melville.
