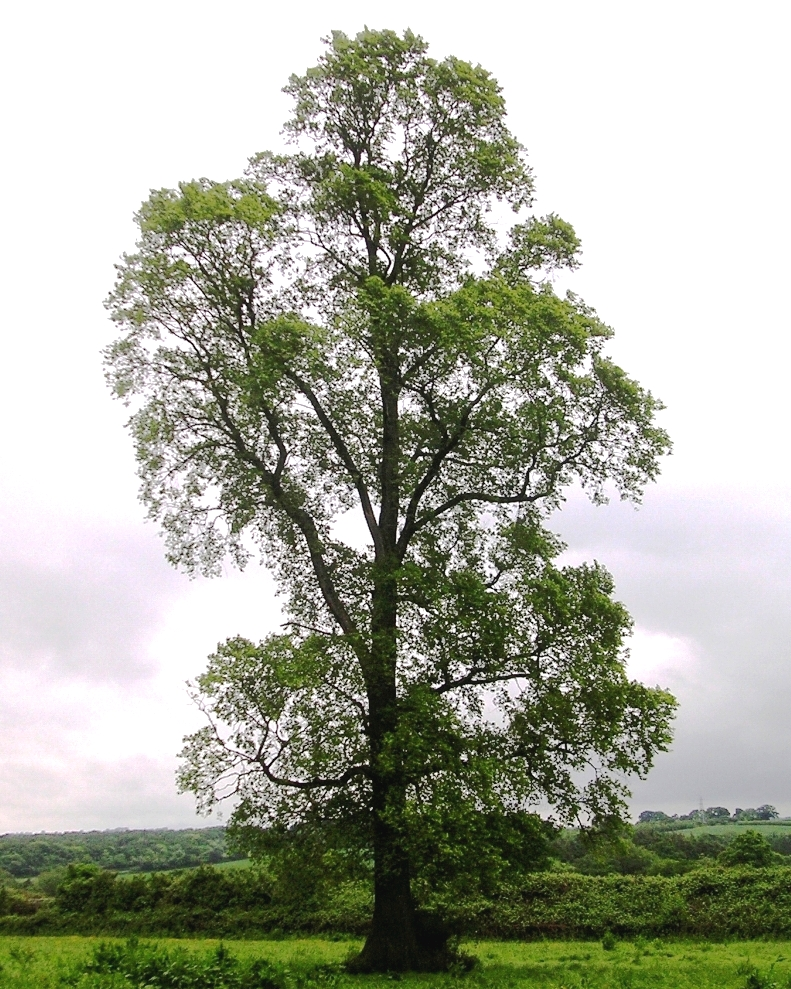
- Smooth-leaved elm at East Coker, Somerset, 2008

Scientific classification
- Kingdom: Plantae
- Clade: Tracheophytes
- Clade: Angiosperms
- Clade: Eudicots
- Clade: Rosids
- Order: Rosales
- Family: Ulmaceae
- Genus: Ulmus
- Species: U. minor Mill.
- Subspecies: U. m. subsp. minor

Trinomial name
- Ulmus minor subsp. minor

Synonyms
- Ulmus campestris var. laevis Spach, Planch.; Ulmus campestris var. glabra Hartig, Planch., Aschers. & Graebn.; Ulmus carpinifolia Gled.; Ulmus foliaceae Gilibert, Sarg.; Ulmus glabra (non Huds.), Ley, Mill., Smith, Loudon, Rchb., Wilkomm, C. K. Schneid.; Ulmus micrantha Kitt.; Ulmus microphylla Mill.; Ulmus nitens Moench; Ulmus sparsa Dumrt.

= Ulmus minor subsp. minor =

Subspecies of tree

Ulmus minor subsp. minor, the narrow-leaved elm (also known as smooth-leaved elm or East Anglian elm), was the name used by R. H. Richens (1983) for English field elms that were not English elm, Cornish elm, Lock elm or Guernsey elm. Many publications, however, continue to use plain Ulmus minor for Richens's subspecies, a name Richens reserved for the undifferentiated continental field elms. (Ulmus minor is native to southern Europe and Asia Minor including Iran.) The name Ulmus minor subsp. minor is justified by the existence of at least one other distinctive U. minor subspecies, U. minor subsp. canescens (accepted as such by Plants of the World Online). Dr Max Coleman of Royal Botanic Garden Edinburgh argued in his 2002 paper 'British Elms' that there was no clear distinction between species and subspecies.

In England, narrow-leaved elm is the commonest field elm in East Anglia, the East Midlands, and eastern Kent.

== Description ==
The smooth-leaved elm is a deciduous tree that can grow to 35 m. Its Latin synonym carpinifolia alludes to the superficial similarity of the leaves to those of hornbeam Carpinus sp., while the common names contrast the smooth upper surface and narrowness of the leaves with those of the wych elm, which are rough and broad. The apetalous perfect wind-pollinated flowers, and fruit (samaras) are very similar to those of the species.

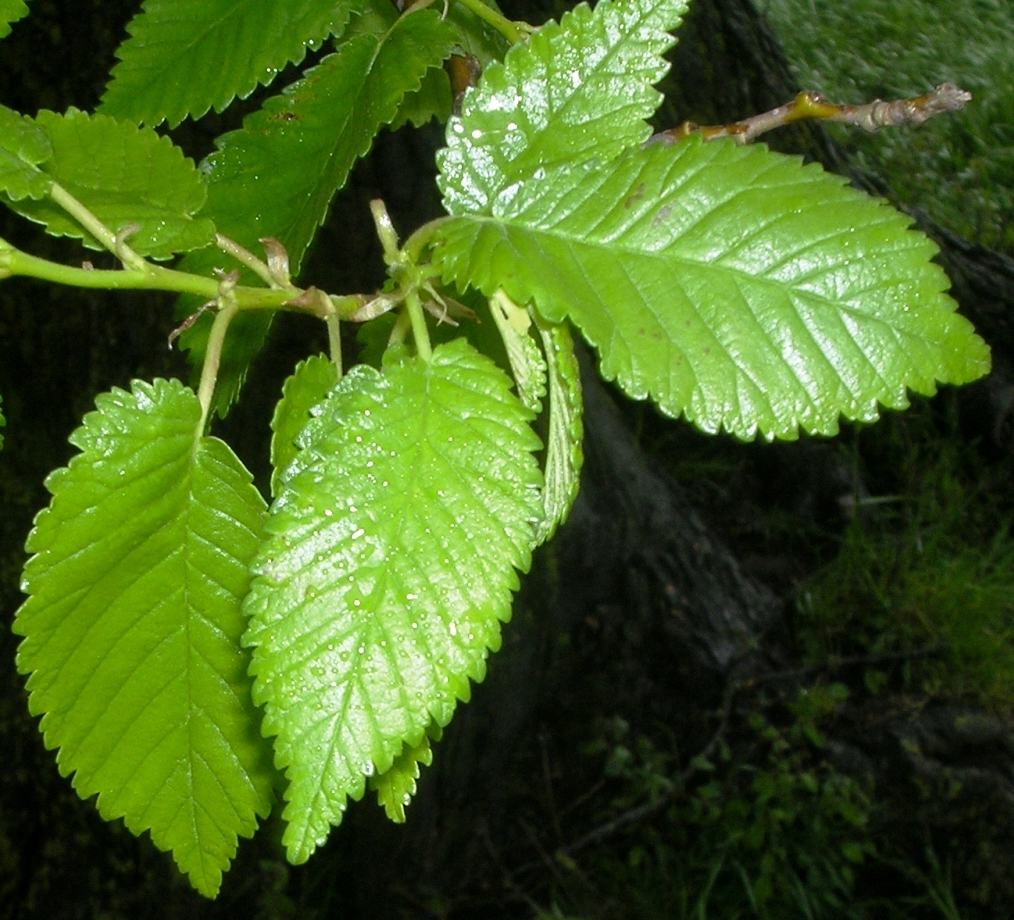
Smooth-leaved elm foliage, May

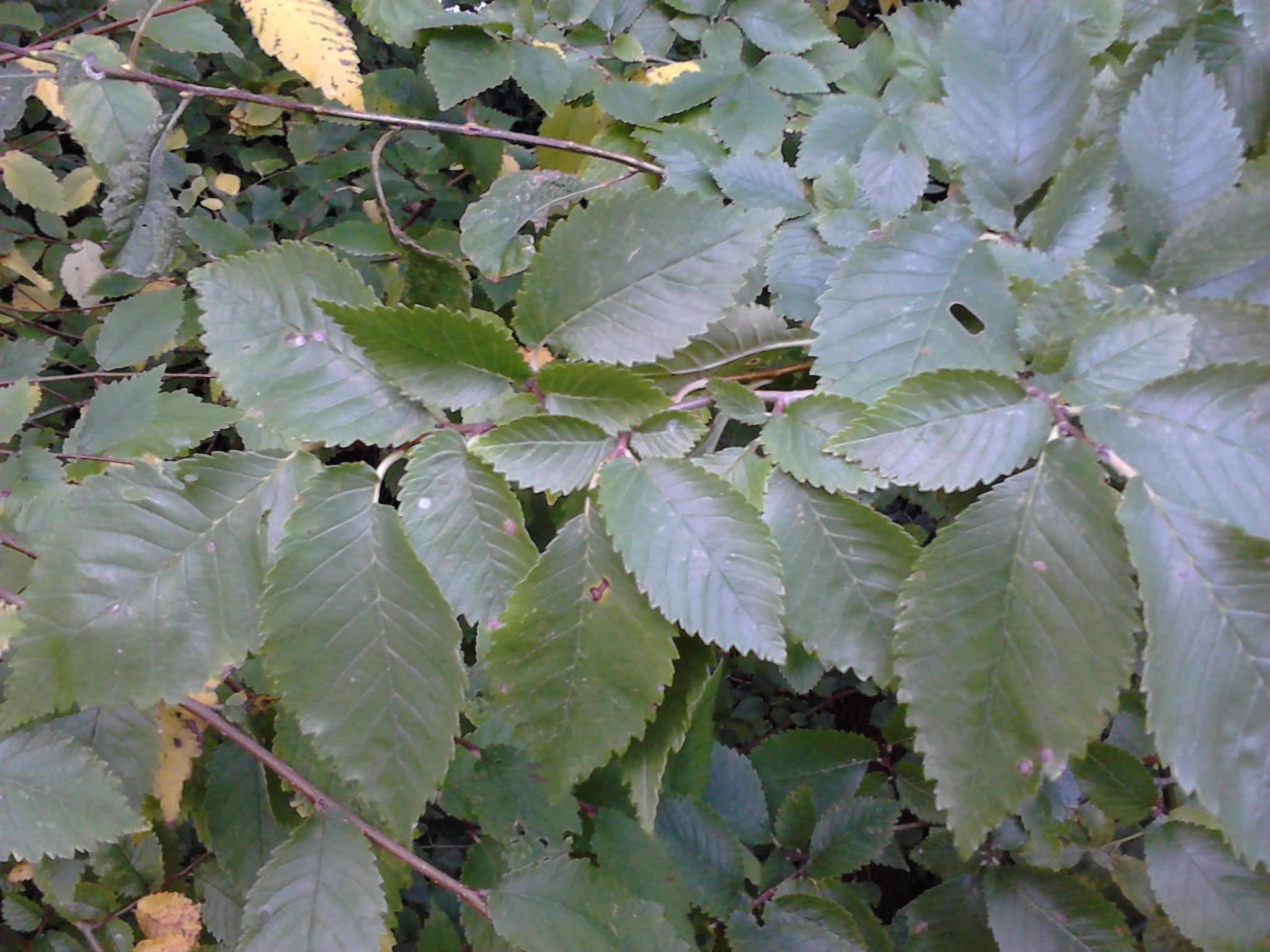
Smooth-leaved elm foliage, October

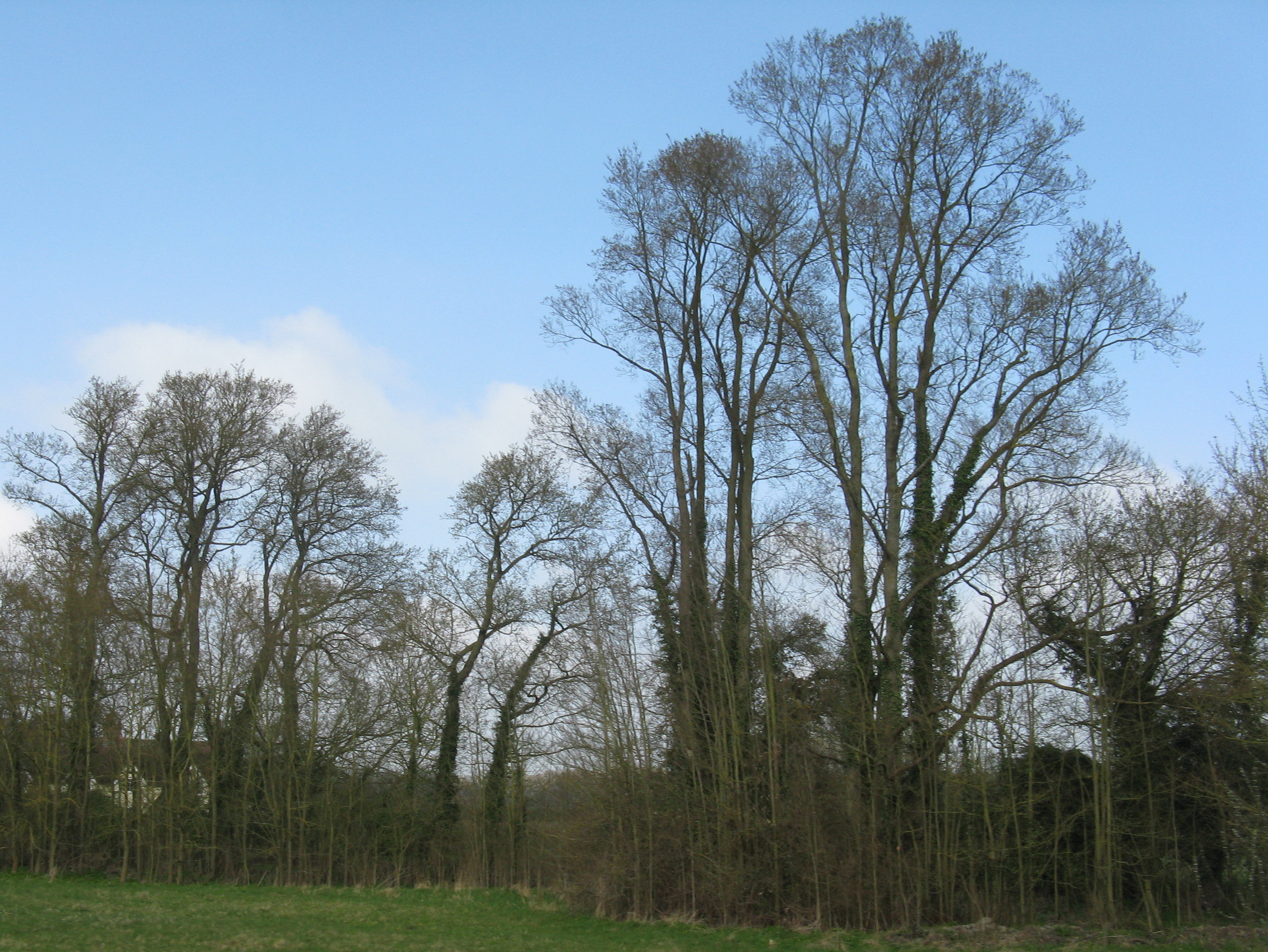
East Anglian elms in spring, near Abbots Ripton, Cambridgeshire (2017)

== Pests and diseases ==
Although the smooth-leaved elm is generally susceptible to Dutch elm disease, it is genetically a highly variable tree and it is possible some specimens survive in the UK owing to an innately high level of resistance (see Cultivation). Research currently (2009) in hand by Cemagref at Le Pepiniére forestiére de l'Etat, Guémené-Penfao, France, should confirm this. However, all smooth-leaved elm varieties are believed to have been introduced into Britain from central and southern Europe during the Bronze Age, and some, being beyond their natural climates and environments, may be growing slowly and thus producing smaller springwood vessels restrictive to the Ophiostoma fungus. Good performance in the field may also be owing to resistance to bark beetle feeding or breeding. Moreover, several types of this subspecies also have very pendulous twigs when mature, a factor which could also make them unattractive to foraging Scolytus beetles, which are disinclined to invert themselves.

As the tree suckers readily, its genetic resources are not considered endangered.

The subspecies has a moderate to high susceptibility to the elm leaf beetle, Xanthogaleruca luteola, and a moderate susceptibility to elm yellows.

== Cultivation ==
Four great East Anglian elms, Ulmus minor subsp. minor, tower over an oak (left) and a two-storey house, Badingham, Suffolk, 1984

Many mature specimens still survive in England, notably in East Anglia. The Woodland Trust currently lists (2013) some 120 surviving "ancient" smooth-leaved elms in England and Wales, some of which are among the elms now being cloned, propagated and planted as part of The Conservation Foundation's 'Great British Elm Experiment' and 'Ulmus londinium' projects, a scheme to identify disease-resistant strains and return elms to city and countryside. Among "varieties with most resistance", Professor Oliver Rackham noted (1986) the 'Boxworth elm', still thriving (2022) in and around Boxworth, Cambridgeshire, and from c.2010 propagated experimentally by the Conservation Foundation.

In a more academically based project, most of the clones of the surviving European field elms that have been tested since the 1990s for innate resistance to Dutch elm disease by national research institutes in the EU, with a view to returning field elm to cultivation in Europe, would be classified by Richens's system as Ulmus minor subsp. minor. Results from Spain (2013), for example, confirm that a very small number of surviving field elms (about 0.5% of those tested) appear to have comparatively high levels of tolerance of the disease, and it is hoped that a controlled crossing of the best of these will produce resistant Ulmus minor hybrids for cultivation.

Of pendulous Ulmus nitens (U. minor subsp. minor), Elwes noted (1913) that in Hertfordshire and along the western borders of Essex "the most graceful form of this tree may be seen in perfection". Narrow-leaved elm was occasionally planted as an ornamental urban tree.

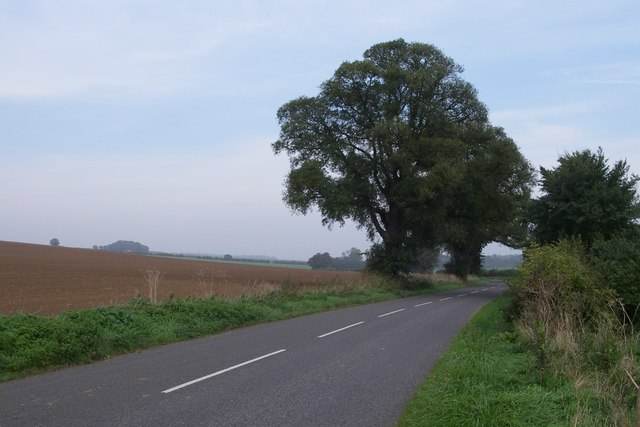
Narrow-leaved elms (East Anglian elm group), Dean Road, Bartlow, Cambridgeshire (2006)

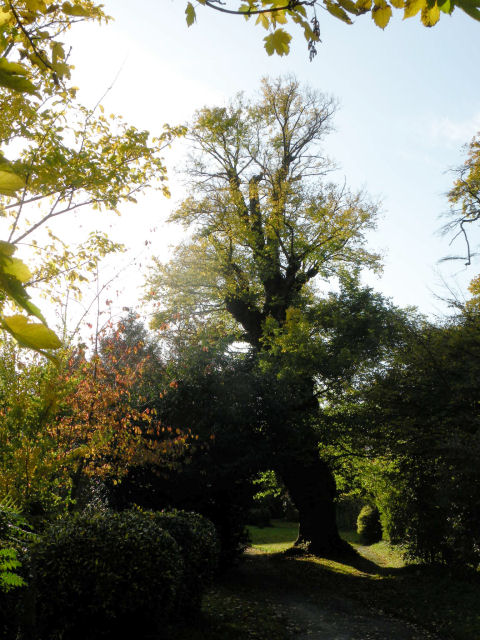
Pollarded 'Boxworth elm' (East Anglian elms group), Boxworth, Cambridgeshire (2008)

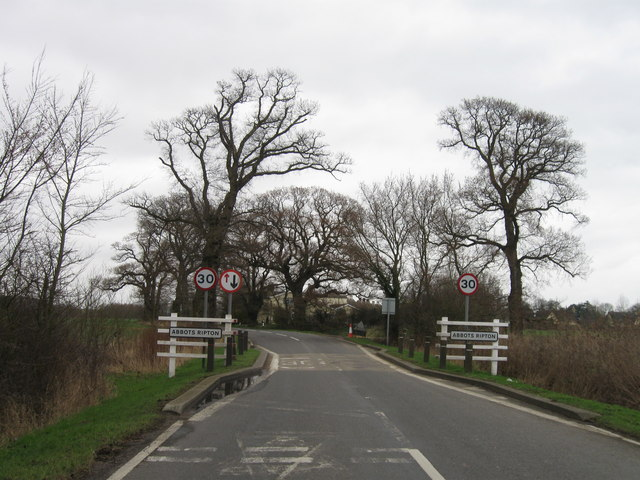
East Anglian elms (all the trees here), Abbots Ripton, Huntingdonshire (2011)

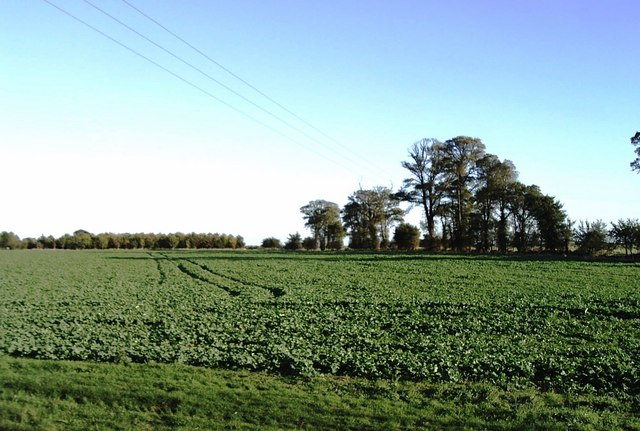
Narrow-leaved elms near Tillingham, Dengie peninsula, Essex (2010)

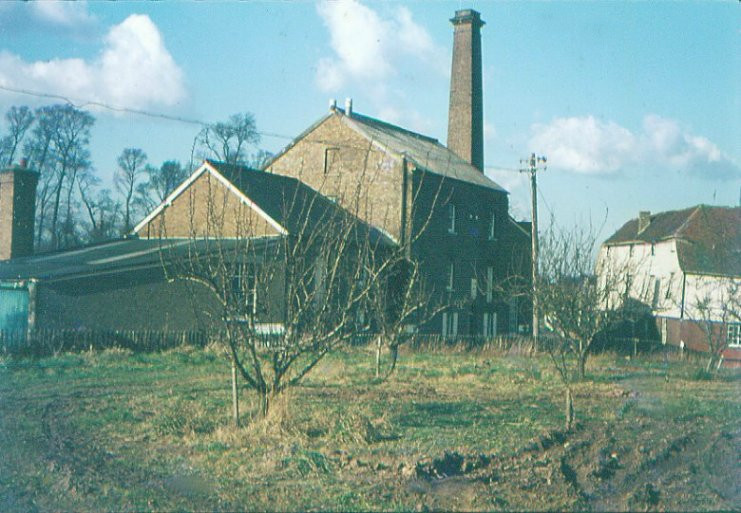
East Kent narrow-leaved elms above Tonge Mill, near Sittingbourne (1969)

== Notable trees ==
The largest recorded tree in the UK grew at Great Amwell in Hertfordshire, measuring 40 m in height and 228 cm diameter at breast height (d.b.h.) in 1911. Another famous specimen was the great elm that towered above its two siblings at the bottom of Long Melford Green, Long Melford, Suffolk, till the group succumbed to disease in 1978. The three "were survivors of a former clone of at least nine elms, one dating from 1757". The Long Melford elms were painted in 1940 by the watercolourist S. R. Badmin in his 'Long Melford Green on a Frosty Morning', now in the Victoria and Albert Museum.

The largest known surviving trees are at East Coker, Somerset (30 m high, 95 cm d.b.h.), Termitts Farm near Hatfield Peverel, Essex (25 m high, 145 d.b.h.), and Melchbourne, Bedfordshire, (147 cm d.b.h.). An old East Anglian elm that stands (2024) by the Post Office, Abbots Ripton, Cambridgeshire, was incorrectly identified as 'Atinia' in Seddon and Shreeve's Great British Elms (Kew Gardens, 2024).

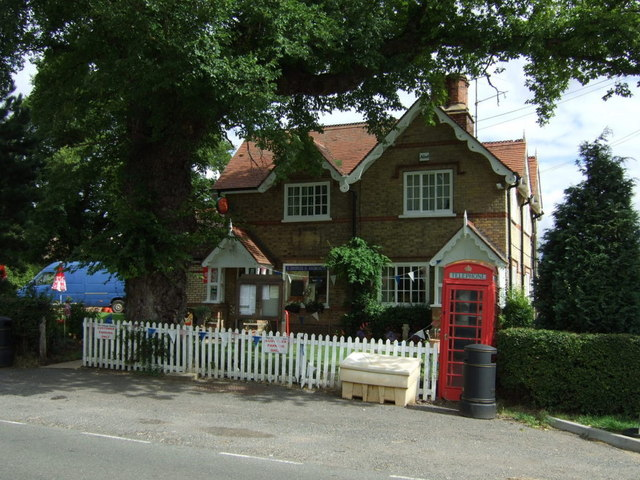
The old East Anglian elm by the Post Office, Abbots Ripton (2014)

== Cultivars ==
- Ulmus minor 'Argenteo-Variegata' (variegated smooth-leaved elm)

== Hybrids and hybrid cultivars ==
The tree's natural range in eastern England overlaps with that of wych elm (Ulmus glabra), the two species hybridizing to produce elms of the Ulmus × hollandica group. Nursery cultivars in this group with English U. minor subsp. minor in their parentage include 'Vegeta', 'Cicestria', and 'Smithii'.

U. minor subsp. minor is believed to have hybridized also with Plot's elm to create elms of the Ulmus × viminalis group, presumed source of the cultivar 'Viminalis' or 'Antarctica'.

== Accessions ==
=== North America ===
- Brooklyn Botanic Garden, New York, acc. nos. 350001, X02487 (as U. carpinifolia).
- Dawes Arboretum , Newark, Ohio. 3 trees, listed as U. carpinifolia, no acc. details available.
- Dominion Arboretum, Ottawa, Ontario, Canada. Listed as U. carpinifolia. No acc. details available.

=== Europe ===
- Brighton & Hove City Council, NCCPG Elm Collection.
- Royal Botanic Garden, Wakehurst Place, as U. carpinifolia Gled., acc. nos. 1975–6201, 1977–6682, collected by Melville.
