= Ulmus minor 'Goodyeri' =

Elm cultivar

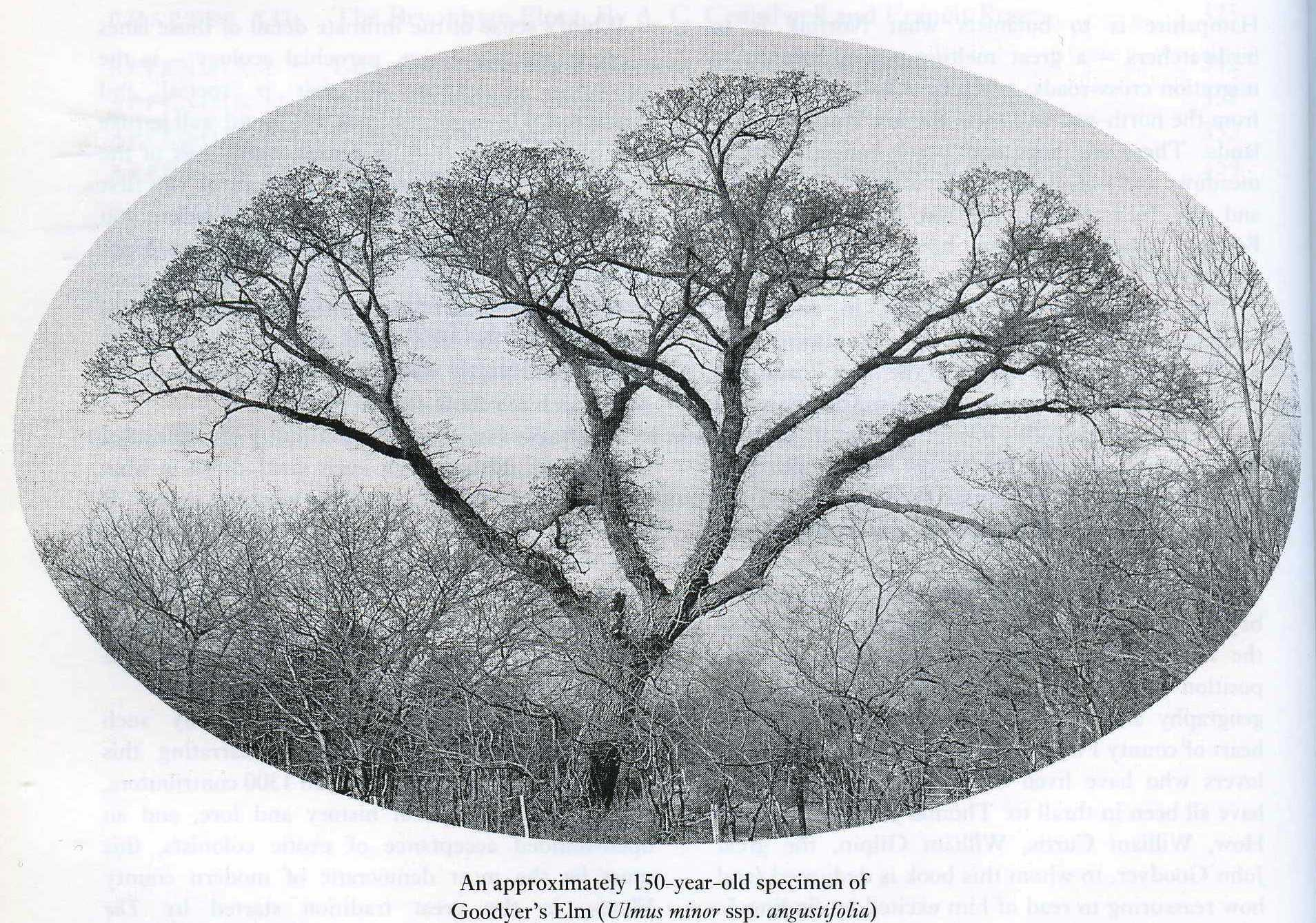
- Goodyer Elm, Rockford, c. 1960
- Species: Ulmus minor
- Cultivar: 'Goodyeri'
- Origin: Pennington, England

The Field Elm cultivar Ulmus minor 'Goodyeri', commonly known as 'Goodyer's Elm', was discovered by John Goodyer in 1624 at Pennington near the Hampshire coast between Lymington and Christchurch. No old specimens are known to survive, but the tree is perpetuated by numerous root suckers, notably in the lanes about the Alice Lisle public house in the New Forest hamlet of Rockford. The tree has suffered misidentification in the centuries since its discovery, firstly by Philip Miller in his 'Gardeners' Dictionary' of 1731, and later in the early 20th century by Augustine Henry and Marcus Woodward, who both confused the tree with Plot Elm, whose centre of distribution is in the East Midlands, some 200 miles away and of completely different appearance.

Augustin Ley prepared a herbarium specimen from Goodyer's Elm (without using that name) near Lymington in 1882, calling the trees just Ulmus glabra Mill.. Melville rediscovered Goodyer's Elm in 1937, publishing an account of it in 1938 and describing it as a form of Cornish Elm. In a later paper, 'The names of the Cornish and the Jersey elm' (Kew Bulletin, 1960), he acknowledged that the suggestion that Goodyer's was a variety of Cornish had already been made by Weston in his Flora Anglicana (1775): "It is evident that by the time Weston published the Flora Anglicana he had reached the conclusion that the Cornish Elm and Goodyer's Hampshire Elm were varieties of a single species, which was distinct from U. campestris."

== Synonymy ==
- Ulmus stricta var. goodyeri Melville
- Ulmus minor subsp. angustifolia var. goodyeri Richens

== Description ==
The tree is chiefly distinguished by its short bole and low, spreading branches. In other respects, notably its small leaves <3 cm long by 1.5 cm wide, the tree is very similar to Cornish Elm. Oliver Rackham noted that Cornish elms with "more spreading" crowns grow around Truro and on the Lizard Peninsula, illustrating the variety, which he called 'Lizard Elm', with a 1980 photograph.

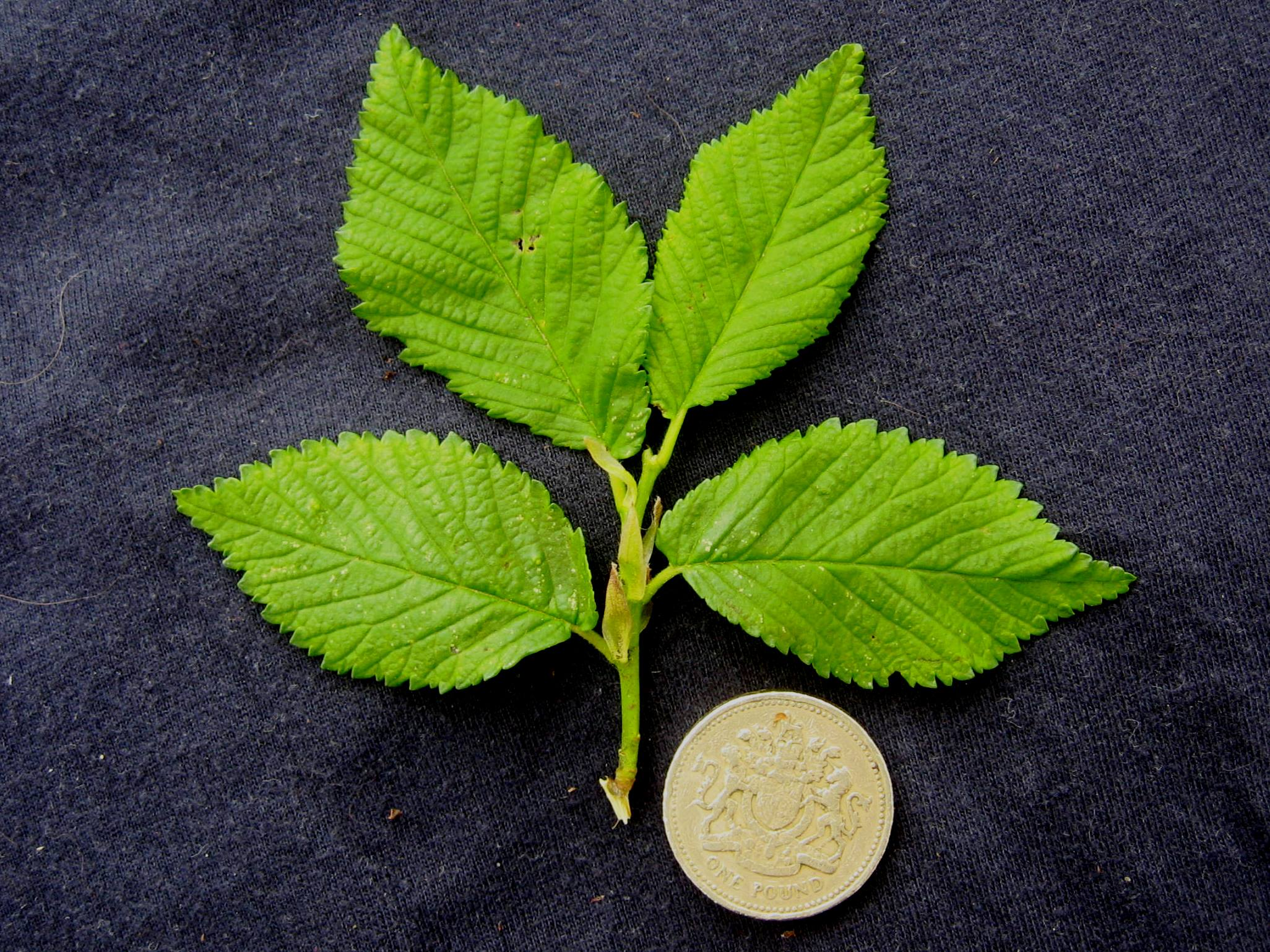
Goodyer's Elm leaves and £1 coin

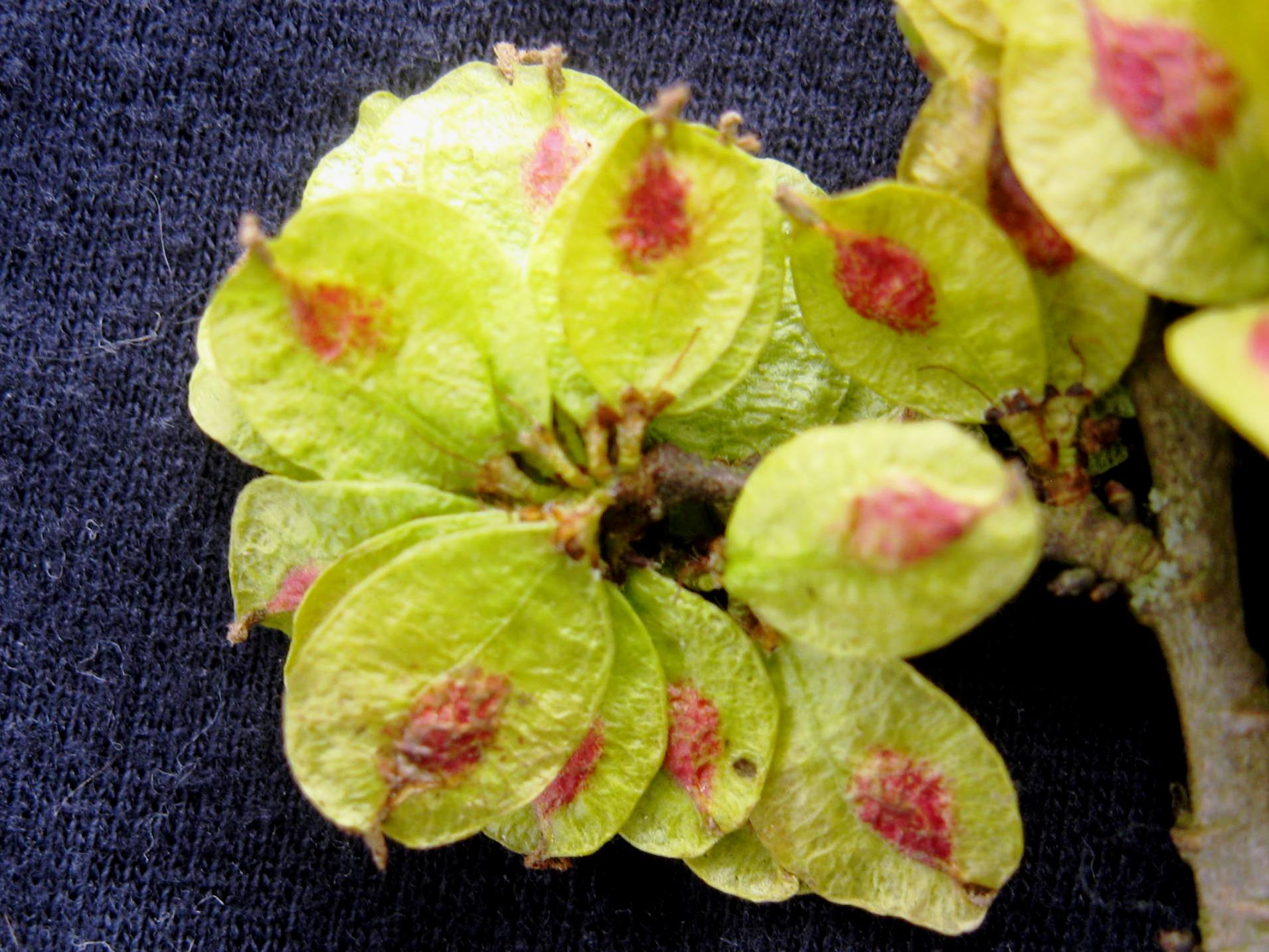
Goodyer's Elm samarae

== Pests and diseases ==
Goodyer's Elm is very susceptible to Dutch elm disease.

== Cultivation ==
The tree is not known to be in cultivation in the UK, with the exceptions of two specimens introduced to arboreta 2012–16 (see 'Accessions'), nor is it known to have been introduced to continental Europe, North America or Australasia.

== Notable trees ==
A small but sexually mature tree survives beneath an oak near the Alice Lisle public house at Rockford, its trunk severely arched by its search for light.

== Accessions ==
=== Europe ===
- Grange Farm Arboretum, Sutton St James, Spalding, Lincolnshire, UK. As U. minor subsp. angustifolia var. goodyeri. Acc. no. 1081.
- Sir Harold Hillier Gardens, Romsey, Hants., UK. Acc. no. 2016.0400
