= Ulmus minor 'Plotii' =

Cultivar of the field elm

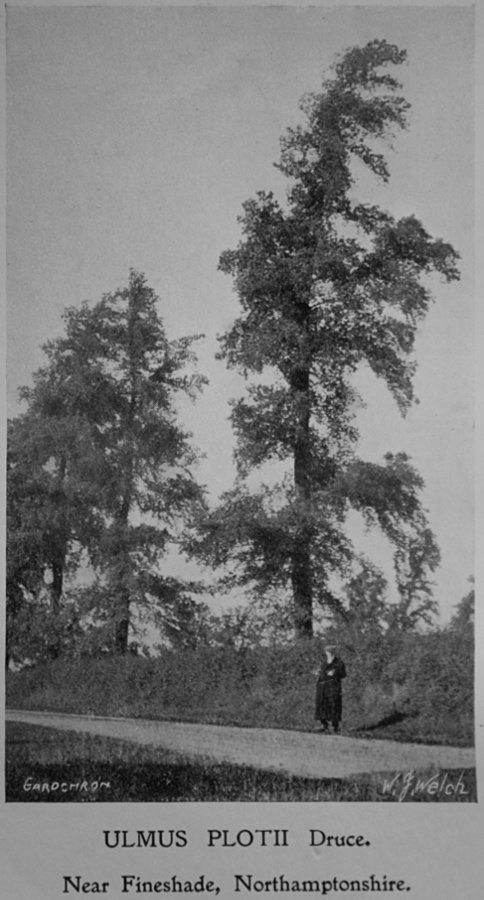
- 'Plotii', near Fineshade, 1911
- Species: Ulmus minor
- Cultivar: 'Plotii'
- Origin: England

The field elm cultivar Ulmus minor 'Plotii', commonly known as Lock elm or Lock's elm (its vernacular names), Plot's elm or Plot elm, and first classified as Ulmus sativa Mill. var. Lockii and later as Ulmus plotii by Druce in 1907-11 (see 'Etymology'), is endemic mainly to the East Midlands of England, notably around the River Witham in Lincolnshire, in the Trent Valley around Newark-on-Trent, and around the village of Laxton, Northamptonshire. Ronald Melville suggested that the tree's distribution may be related to river valley systems, in particular those of the Trent, Witham, Welland, and Nene. Two further populations existed in Gloucestershire. It has been described as Britain's rarest native elm, and recorded by The Wildlife Trust as a nationally scarce species.

As with other members of the Field Elm group, the taxonomy of Plot Elm has been a matter of contention, several authorities, notably Professor Clive A. Stace in New Flora of the British Isles (2010), recognizing it as a species in its own right. It is as U. plotii Druce that the specimens held by the Royal Botanic Gardens at Kew and Wakehurst Place are listed. R. H. Richens, however, contended (1955, 1977, 1983) that it is simply one of the more distinctive clones of the polymorphous Ulmus minor, conjecturing that it arose as an U. minor sport and that its incidence in the English Midlands may have been linked to its use as a distinctive marker along Drovers' roads. After Richens had challenged the species hypothesis, the tree was the subject of a study at the Royal Botanic Garden Edinburgh by Dr Max Coleman (2000), which showed that trees a perfect fit with the 'type' material of Plot elm were of a single clone (genetically identical to each other). Arguing in a 2002 paper that there was no clear distinction between species and subspecies, and suggesting that known or suspected clones of U. minor, once cultivated and named, should be treated as cultivars, Coleman preferred the designation U. minor 'Plotii' to U. minor var. plotii or var. lockii, forms used in late 20th-century publications.

Alfred Rehder considered Ulmus Plotii Druce synonymous with Jonathan Stokes' Ulmus surculosa argutifolia, described from trees at Furnace Mill near North Wingfield, Derbyshire, (Note: Possibly a misprint for Furnace Hill, near North Wingfield.) before 1812. Earlier still, a herbarium specimen labelled Ulmus angustissima collected in the 1670s by Edward Morgan, the Welsh botanist referred to by Evelyn in his Diary and colleague of Thomas Johnson, was identified by Druce in 1919 as Ulmus plotii. Morgan's source location is not recorded; the nearest Plot Elm (recorded in the 20th century) to his North Wales home was in Shropshire.

Augustine Henry, though he equated (1913) the elm with Druce's, miscalled it Goodyer's Elm (U. minor 'Goodyeri'). The trees John Goodyer discovered were near the south coast at Pennington, Hampshire, some 200 miles away from the centre of distribution of 'Plotii' and very dissimilar in structure.

== Description ==
Richens stated that "a unilateral habit is the prime diagnostic feature of U. plotii." This habit of branching tends to make the Plot appear narrow from some angles. Before the advent of Dutch elm disease, this slender, "loose-habited", monopodial tree grew to a height of 30 metres (98 ft). It was chiefly characterized by its cocked crown comprising a few short ascending branches. Richens likened its appearance to an ostrich feather, and noted "a general tendency for shoots to continue growth as long shoots". Melville noted more specifically that Plot "is unusually variable in the type of shoot produced on normal branches of the crown. In some seasons trees produce occasional branches bearing only semi-long shoots – i.e. shoots intermediate in character between typical short-shoots and the long extension shoots." These semi-long shoots (also known as "proliferating short-shoots") have smaller, more rounded, more coarsely toothed leaves. The bark remains smooth for several years. A few longer lower branches were often a feature of its profile; the form of old trees will have depended on whether or not these survived cropping and pruning. The obovate to elliptic acuminate leaves are small, nearly equal at the base, rarely > 4 cm in length, with comparatively few marginal teeth, usually < 70; the upper surfaces dull, with a scattering of minute tubercles and hairs. Leaf-flush is comparatively late. (Note: A circa 1950 photograph of PoW Camp 138 at Bassingham, Lincolnshire, shows a line of Plot just coming into leaf at the same time as horse chestnut is in flower.) The samarae rarely ripen, but when mature are narrowly obovate, < 13 mm in length, with a triangular open notch.

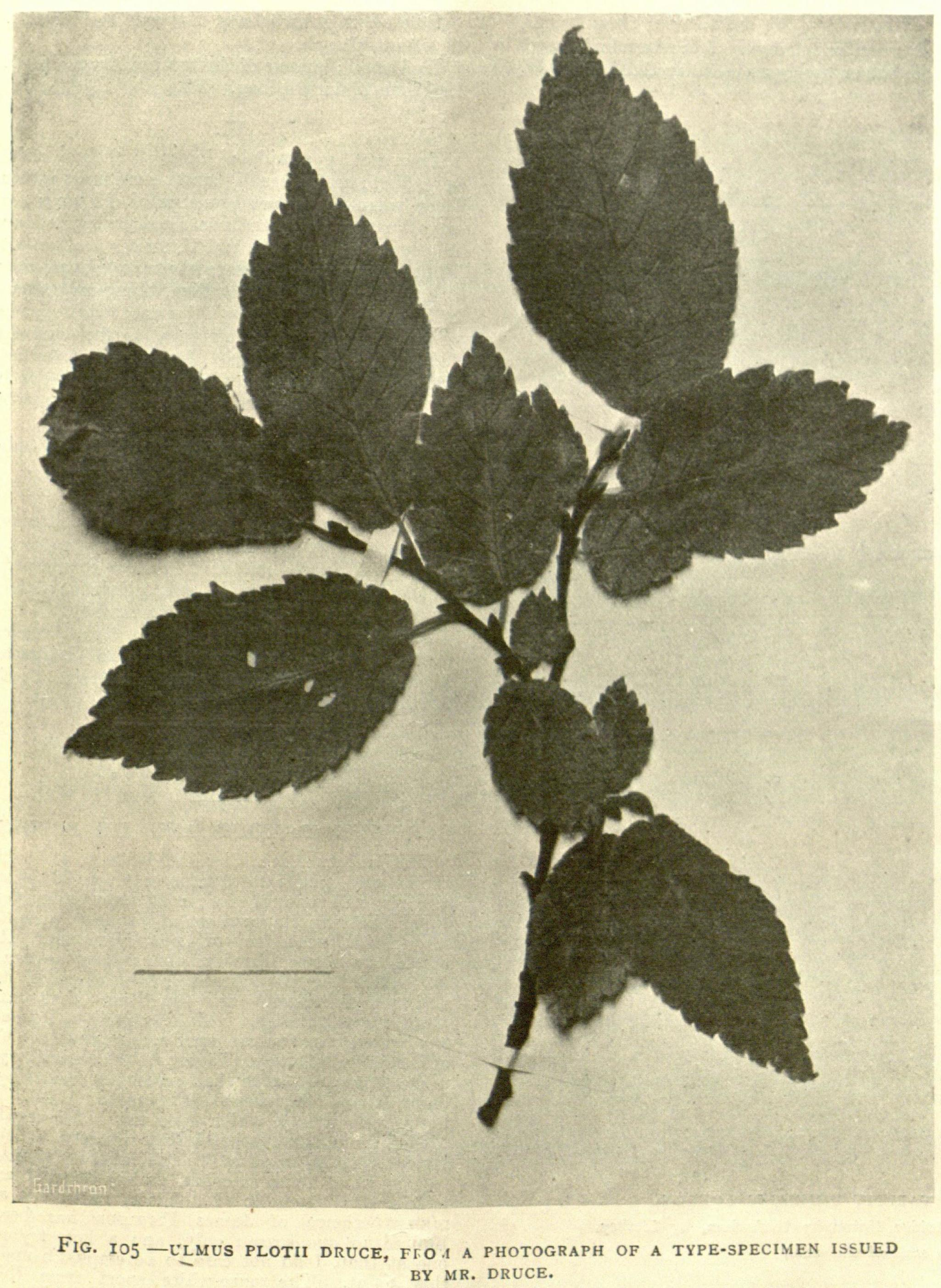
Ulmus plotii Druce leaves, The Gardeners' Chronicle, 1912

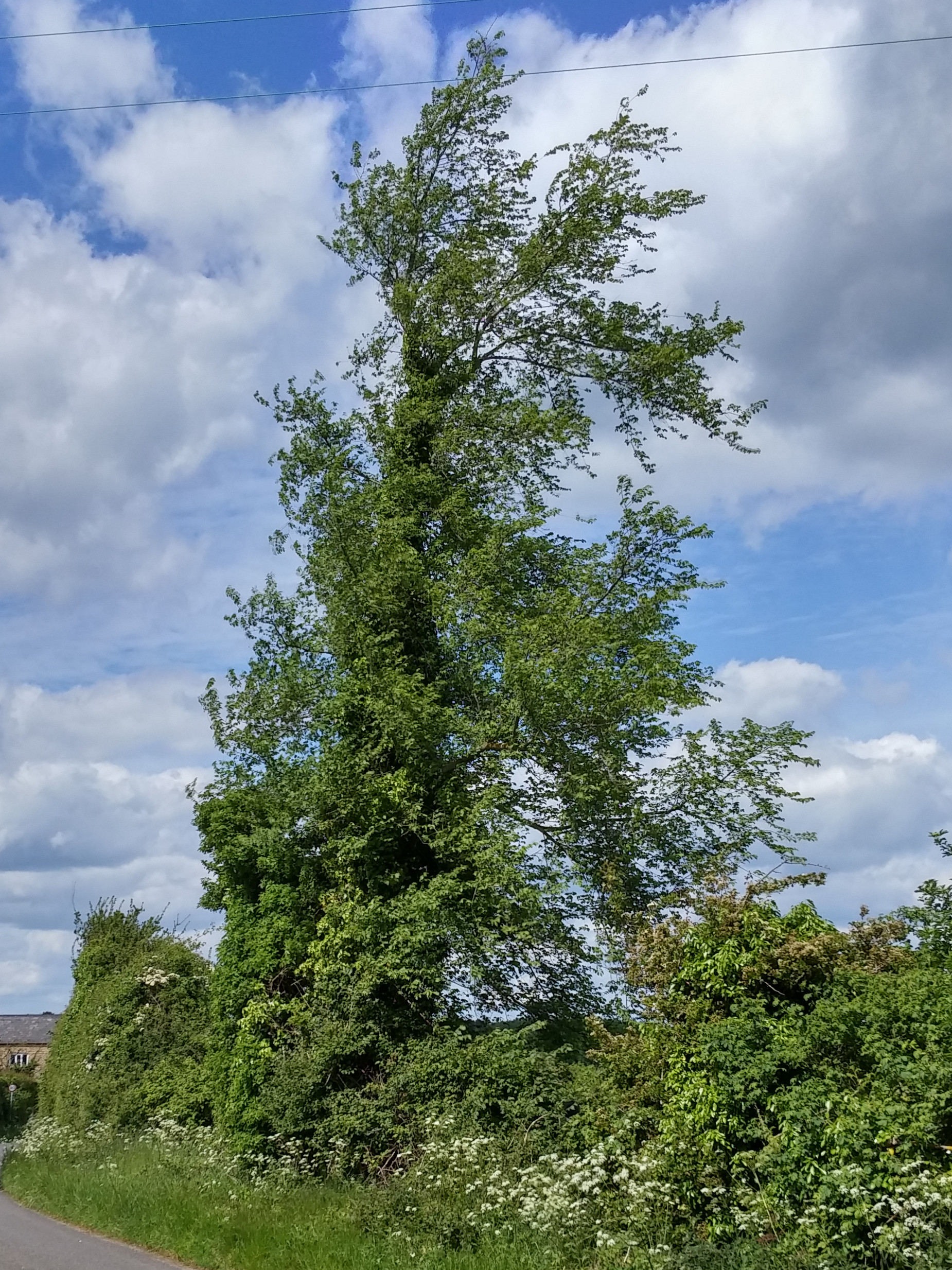
Young Plot Elm, Laxton, Northamptonshire, 2015

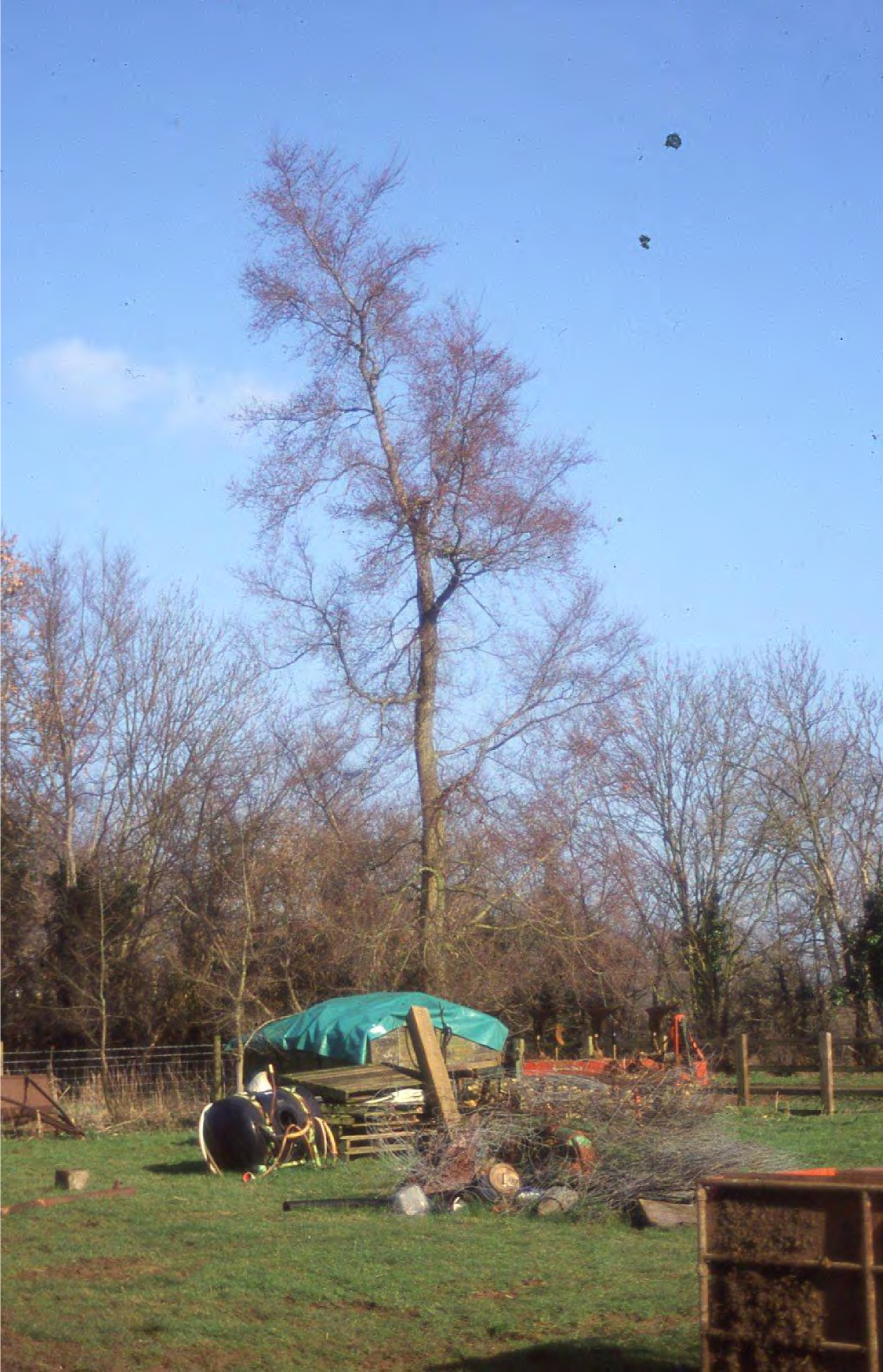
Plot Elm, Laxton, Northamptonshire (upper stem missing)

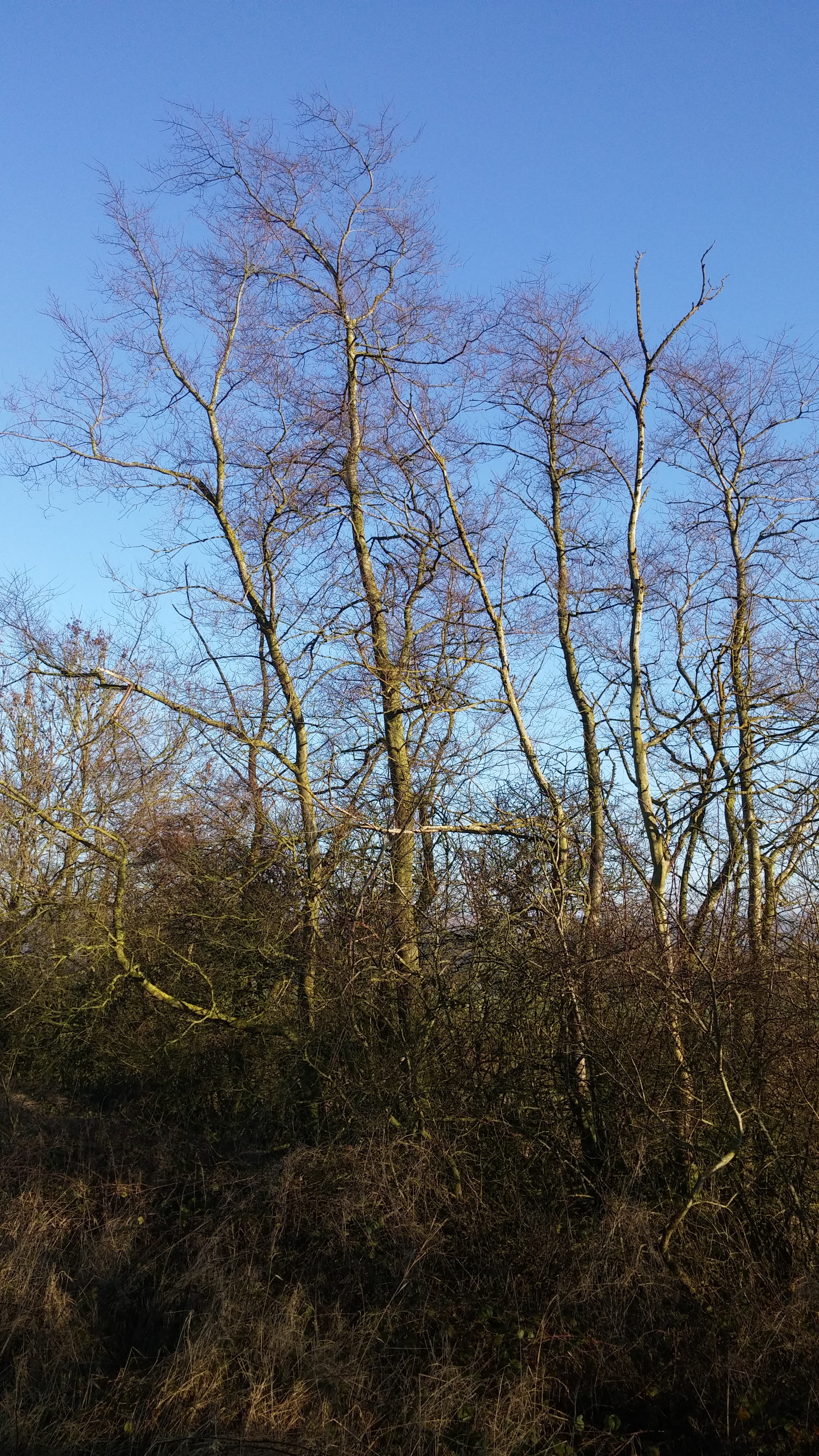
Young 'Plotii' in winter, Scamblesby, Lincolnshire

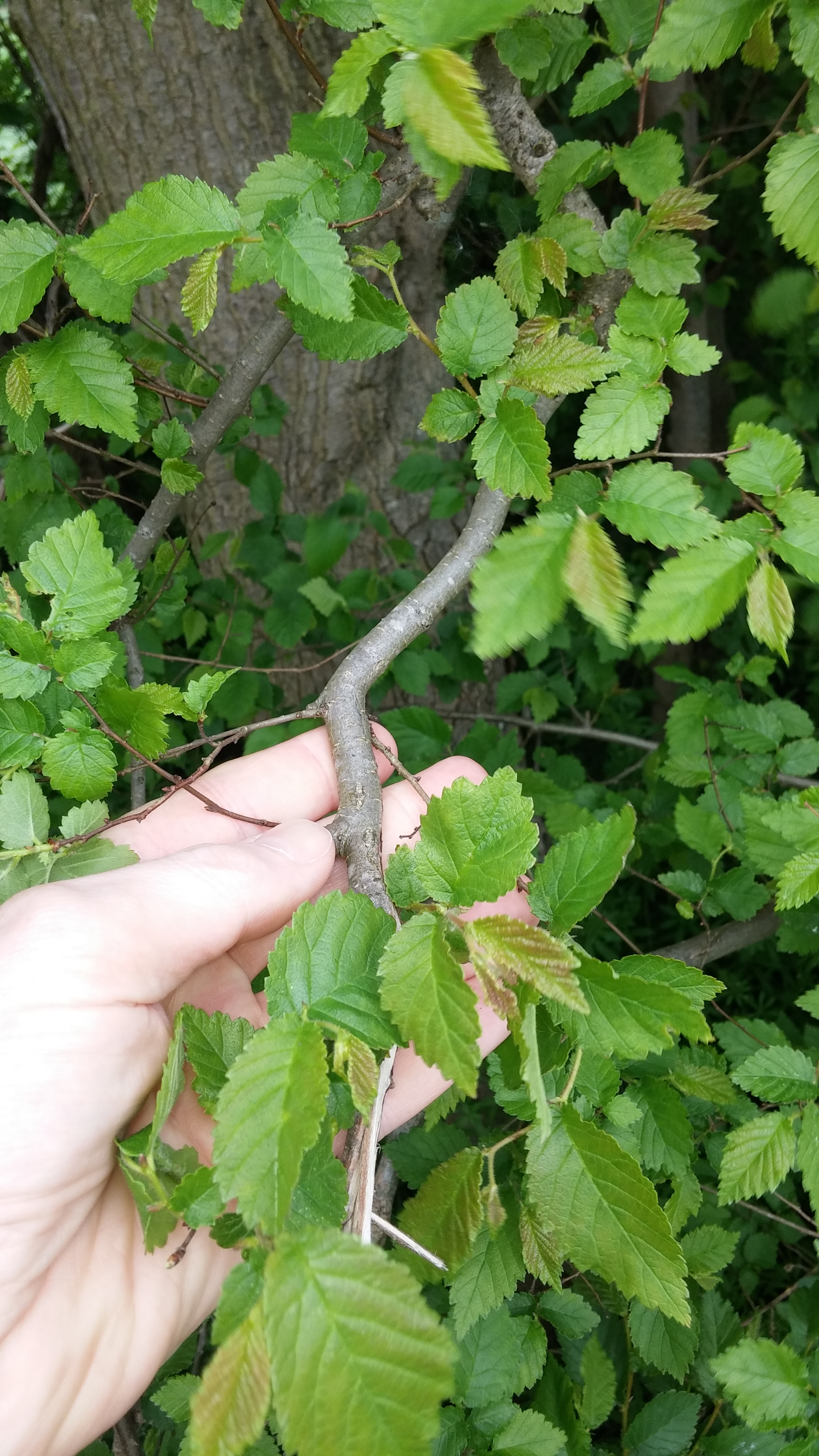
Plot foliage in mid-May, Caythorpe, Nottinghamshire

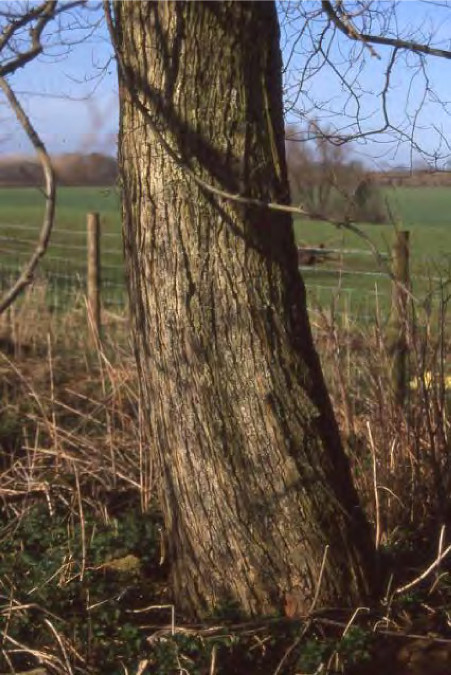
Plot bark, Laxton, Northamptonshire

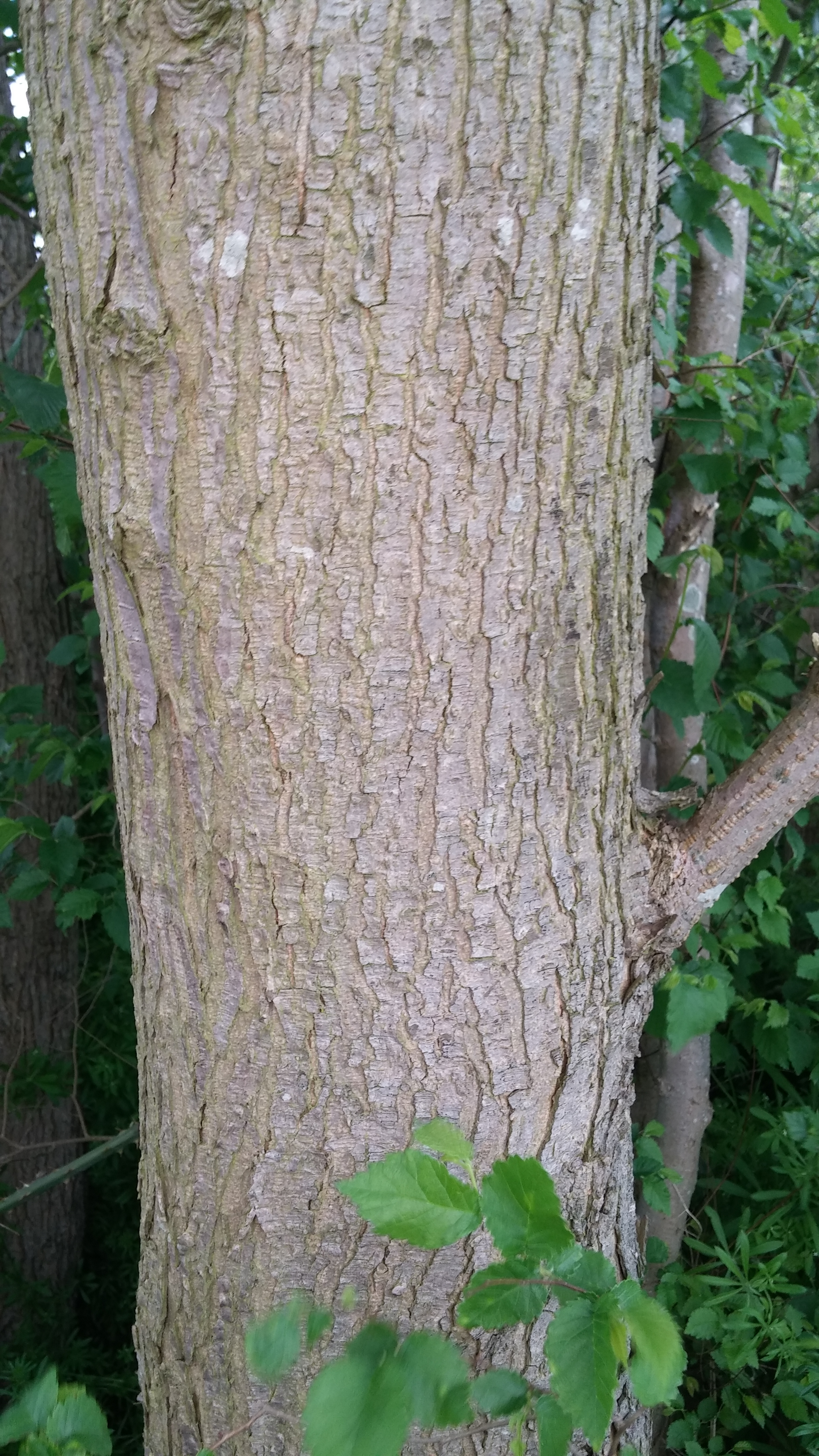
Young Plot bark, Caythorpe, Nottinghamshire

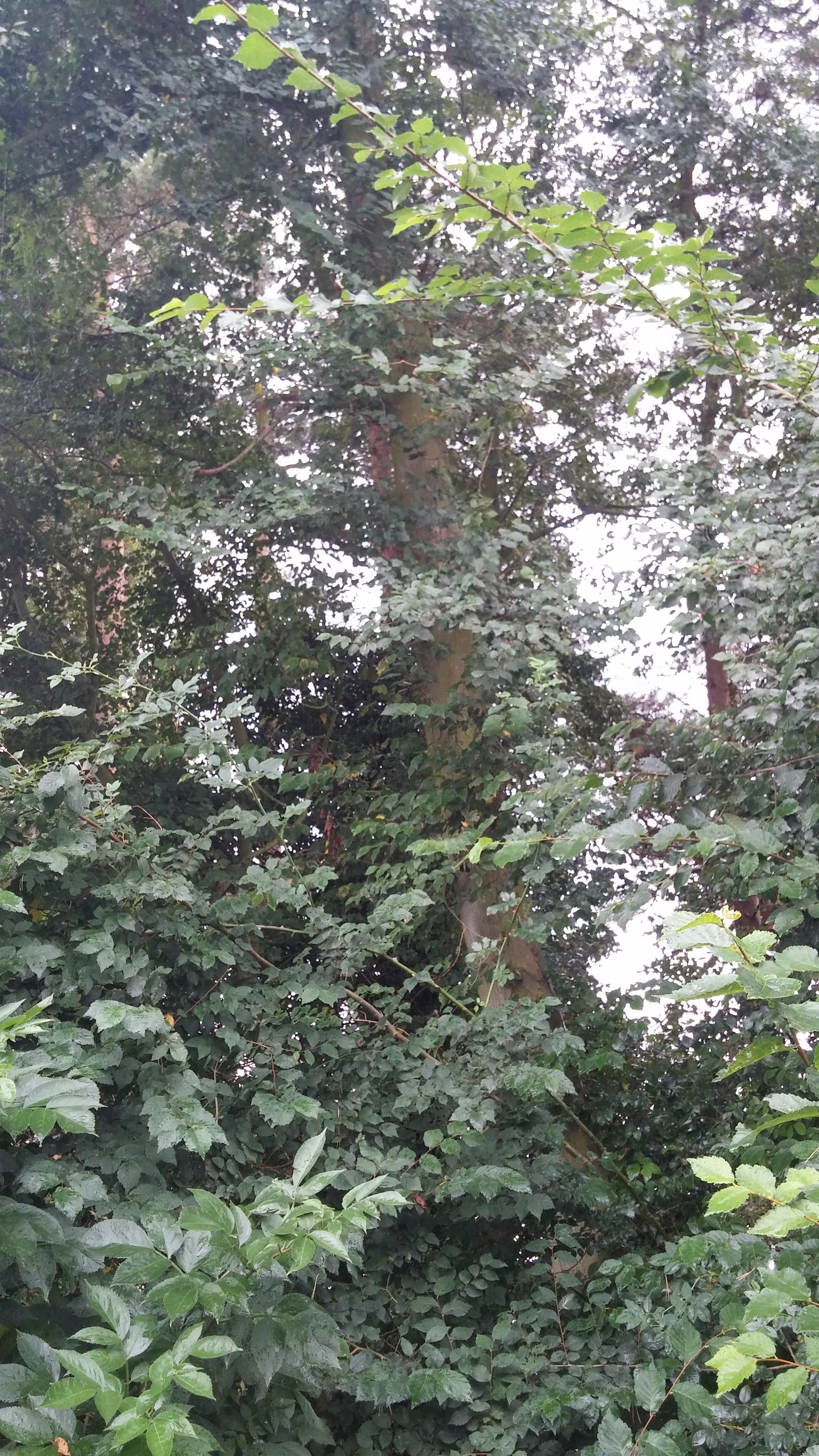
Plot foliage and young bark, Utterby, Lincolnshire

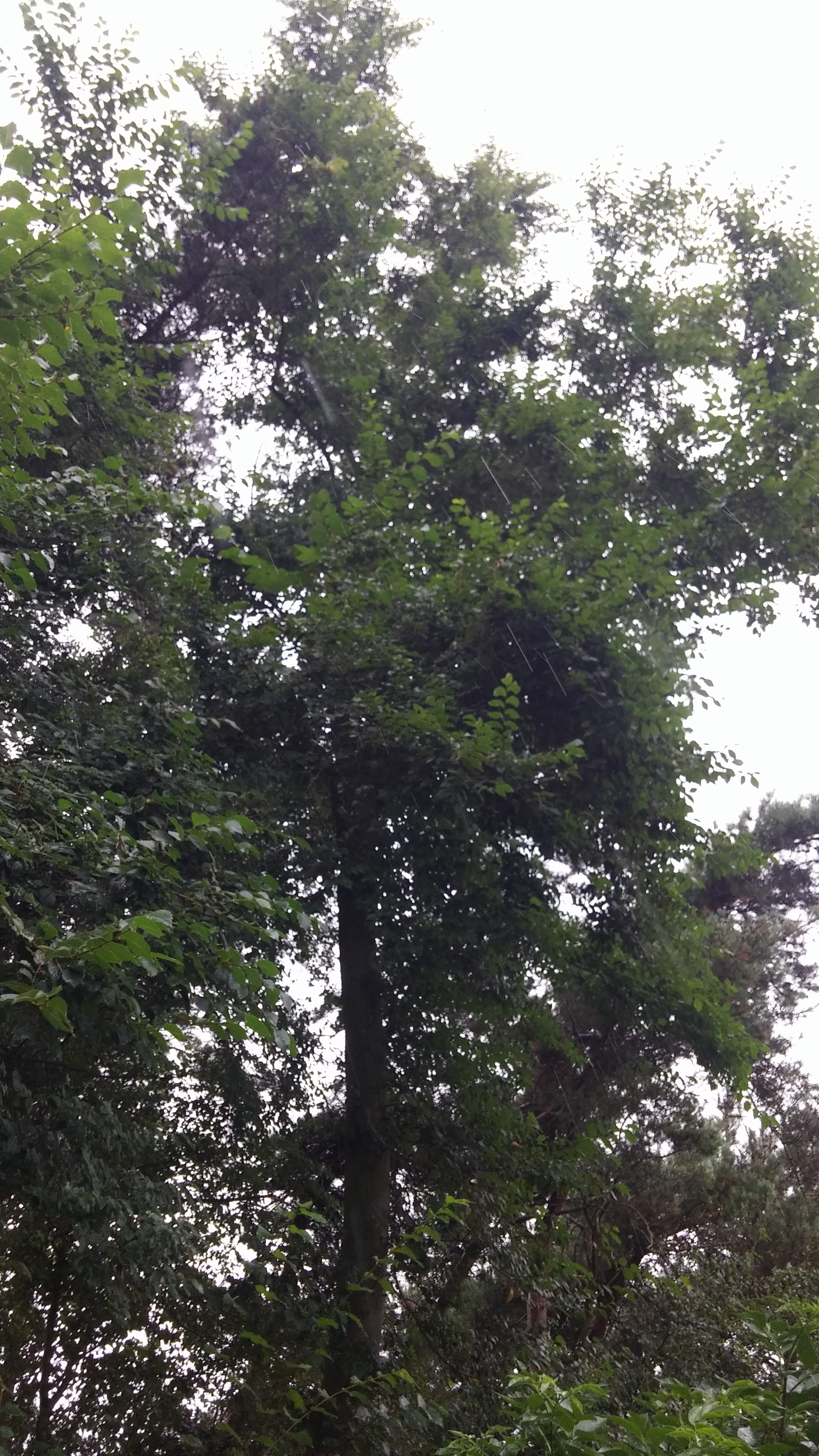
Plot foliage, showing semi-long shoots, Utterby, Lincolnshire (trees died 2023)

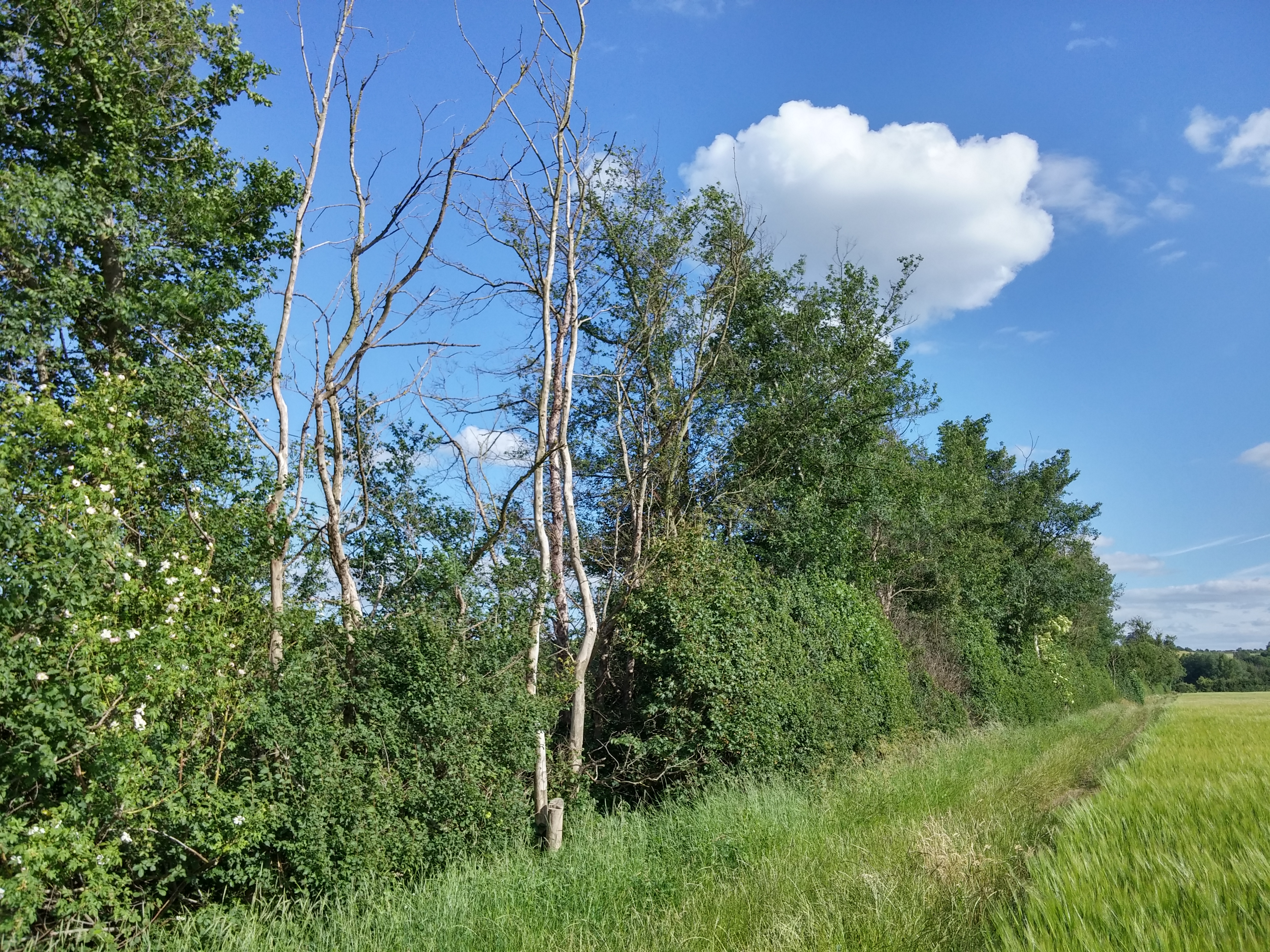
Plot hedge, Caythorpe, Nottinghamshire (2015)

Stokes' Ulmus surculosa argutifolia (1812) [: 'bright-leaved twiggy elm'], considered by Rehder a description of Lock elm pre-dating Druce's by a century, was likewise "a tree with erect stem and branches throughout its length, and with small elliptic leaves, scabrous above and villose beneath, 1 to 2.5 inches long, that narrowed at the base, with margins meeting petiole nearly opposite each other".

== Pests and diseases ==
'Plotii' is very susceptible to Dutch elm disease. No mature specimens are known to survive in England.

== Etymology ==
The tree was first classified by the Oxford botanist George Claridge Druce in 1907-11, who found examples at Banbury and Fineshade, Northamptonshire, and published descriptions with photographs. Druce named the tree for Dr Robert Plot, a 17th-century English naturalist. The older vernacular name 'Lock Elm', in use since at least 1742, is said to be an allusion to the difficulty in working its timber. Druce, however, wrote in 1913 that "The wood is of very good quality, easy to work, and of a different texture from the Wych, Dutch, or English Elm, and has a general usefulness as a substitute for Ash or Wych Elm. The name Locks Elm can have no reference to any difficulty in working or dressing of the wood." 'Lock' may be related to the tree's use in boundaries, as 'loc' is Old English for enclosure. In turn, Lock Elm may have been one of the plants used in witchcraft to open locks and reveal hidden treasure. Richens called the tree U. minor. var. lockii. A. R. Horwood in his book British Wild Flowers – In Their Natural Haunts, called it the 'Northamptonshire Elm'.

Helen Bancroft referred to Plot's Elm as the 'East Anglian Elm', adding that it was often referred to as Wych Elm in the region; however, she was almost certainly alluding to the Smooth-leaved Elm, called 'wych' in East Anglia in early days.

== Cultivation ==
Ulmus minor 'Plotii' locations in east Midlands, England, after Coleman (2000) (Compare Melville's distribution map, 1940.)
- 1. Derbyshire
- 2. Derby U.A.
- 3. Nottinghamshire
- 4. Nottingham U.A.
- 5. Lincolnshire
- 6. Leicestershire
- 7. Leicester U.A.
- 8. Rutland U.A.
- 9. Northamptonshire

Plot-type elms had been noted as distinctive and were being cultivated in collections before they were botanically classified by Druce (1911), as evidenced by the two specimens at Westonbirt House (mature by 1912 when Augustine Henry photographed one of them for his Trees of Great Britain & Ireland) and the tree at Eastington Park. Melville confirmed by field studies in the 1930s that Druce's specimens were typical ('the type'), but believing plotii to be a species and so to some extent variable he also admitted to Kew 'Plot Elms' that varied from the type. Cultivation in the decades that followed, influenced by Melville or sourced from Kew, allowed similar latitude. Plot-like elms that he considered outside the range of his variable species were classified by Melville from the 1940s as Ulmus aff. plotii. Coleman, after his single-clone findings, adapted Melville's name to aff. 'Plotii'. These trees are very close to Plot elm and have a number of characteristics of the type, but their crowns are too broad and regular to match 'Plotii'.

Melville believed that the tree, scattered in distribution by the 20th century, was formerly more abundant. William Henry Wheeler in his History of the fens of south Lincolnshire, being a description of the rivers Witham and Welland and their estuary (1897) – a Plot area – wrote: "The tree of the Fenland and the one which attains to a very large growth is the elm". An uncommon tree even before Dutch elm disease, 'Plotii' has also been affected by the destruction of hedgerows and by urban development within its limited range. No mature 'type' trees are known to survive in its native range. One of the last known stands of semi-mature Plot elms, the Madingley Road elms (Note: Augustine Henry's hybrid Ulmus 'Mossii' was also present in Madingley Rd (Trees of Great Britain & Ireland, vol. 7, p.1865; Kew Herbarium specimen K000852679)) descended from those described by Elwes and Henry in 1913 and by Richens in 1960, was destroyed by the City Council of Richens's own Cambridge in road-widening c.2007–2014. Unlike other forms of Field Elm, 'Plotii' is not a prolific generator of root suckers, but it is not considered critically endangered. Conservation measures were drafted to preserve known stands and to encourage propagation, though it is not clear if any of these were implemented.

"A landscape of such trees," wrote Richens in 1956, "such as occurs in parts of northern Northamptonshire, is highly distinctive, and rather suggestive of a Japanese print." "The Plot Elm is a beautiful tree," agreed Gerald Wilkinson, with "a silhouette no broader than Wheatley's." Wilkinson regarded as a "lost opportunity" the failure of East Midlands councils to cultivate this local elm in preference to exotic plantsmen's varieties. "Unhappily, the plumes of U. plotii are no longer a common feature of the landscape of the Trent above Newark and the Witham above Lincoln. Elms are now [1978] few in these areas that were once the home of Plot Elm. A wartime shortage of wood, altered drainage levels, land clearance for power stations, and machine farming have all combined into the familiar pattern of short-term efficiency and long-term degradation." (Note: Wilkinson's tree-photographs of Plot in Epitaph for the Elm (1978) show known forms; his leaves-photograph, however, from a mislabelled tree at Kew (p.72) and his leaf-illustration drawn from this (p.55) do not match type-Plot herbarium specimens (see External Links).)

Elms labelled 'Plotii' were included in botanical collections such as Kew Gardens, Royal Botanic Garden Edinburgh, (Note: Wilkinson (1978) could find only an untypical specimen at Kew by the late 1970s; Kemp's U. minor var. lockii at RBGE, planted c.1970 in area E3, was destroyed by a storm in 1987.) University of Dundee Botanic Garden (the two latter by Edward Kemp), and Belmonte Arboretum, Wageningen. In the UK 'Plot Elm' was propagated and marketed by the Hillier & Sons nursery, Winchester, Hampshire, from 1949, with 38 sold from 1965 to 1977, when production ceased. Its presence in the Hillier nursery suggests that it was also represented in the Hillier Arboretum in the mid-20th century. The tree is now only planted occasionally owing to its susceptibility to Dutch elm disease. It appears in National Elm Collection lists, but no specimen is known in the Brighton area (2025).

In continental Europe, 'Plotii' was distributed by the Späth nursery of Berlin from at least 1930 onwards, as U. minor Mill. (U. sativa Moss), 'Goodyer-Rüster' [:'Goodyer Elm'], "a tall tree up to 30 m, of upright growth and [with] pendulous [branchlets]". Späth knew Elwes and Henry's 1913 work, with its photograph of one of the Westonbirt trees so named, so is likely to have sourced 'Plotii' either from Westonbirt or from one of Elwes and Henry's other source locations. (The real Goodyer's Elm was rediscovered by Melville in the later 1930s.) Rehder (1949) gives U. sativa Moss as a synonym of 'Plotii'. A tree labelled U. plotii stood in Zuiderpark, The Hague, in the mid-20th century. Plot may have been among the field elms from Boston, Lincolnshire, a Plot area, listed as 'U. foliacea (Boston)', that were present in The Hague in the 1930s. The U. minor that stood in the Ryston Hall arboretum, Norfolk, in the early 20th century may have been Plot Elm, referred to as U. minor in the leading UK tree survey of the day, Elwes and Henry (1913). Späth sent numerous elms to Ryston, but the date when he began supplying Ulmus minor [:Plot Elm] is unknown. Three young specimens were reported (2014) from in a private garden at Seyne les Alpes, France.

In the USA, the " U. minor = U. sativa " introduced as "young grafted plants" to the Arnold Arboretum, Massachusetts, c.1915, were probably Plot Elm, as the arboretum's July 1915 article on European Elms reporting this accession is based on Elwes and Henry's 1913 book (with its striking Plot photograph) and nomenclature. The young trees were established by 1918 and still present in 1922, the arboretum then considering them possibly the only specimens of this kind of elm in the US.

== Notable trees ==
The type tree at Banbury was blown down in a gale around 1943; the timber was donated to Kew. A mature avenue of the 'type' tree stood at Newton on Trent, Lincolnshire, in the early 20th century and a notable quantity grew by the river Tove at Towcester and was present until at least 1955. Two largish trees survived near Calceby, Lincolnshire, till 2019.

One of two late 19th-century specimens in the parkland of Westonbirt House, mature by 1912 when Henry photographed it for his Trees of Great Britain & Ireland, was said by Elwes to be the largest-known tree of its kind in Britain. A clearer, winter photograph appears in Bruce Jackson's Catalogue of the Trees & Shrubs in the Collection of Sir George Lindsay Holford (1927). It was 88 feet (27 m) high and 8.1 feet (2.5 m) in girth in 1921. The 1921 girth may point to the tree's source: it is consistent (on circumference-growth estimates for elm) with a c.1820s planting date – that is, a about a decade after Stokes published his 1812 description, matching Westonbirt, and giving source-location, of his Ulmus surculosa argutifolia. Elwes and Henry examined Druce's 'type' trees in Banbury and the elms of Madingley Road, Cambridge, as well as the Westonbirt specimens, and considered all three the same "species". Another notable specimen, described in Flora of Gloucestershire (1948) as U. plotii Druce, stood in the grounds of Eastington House, Ampney St Peter, Gloucestershire, till blown down c.1947.

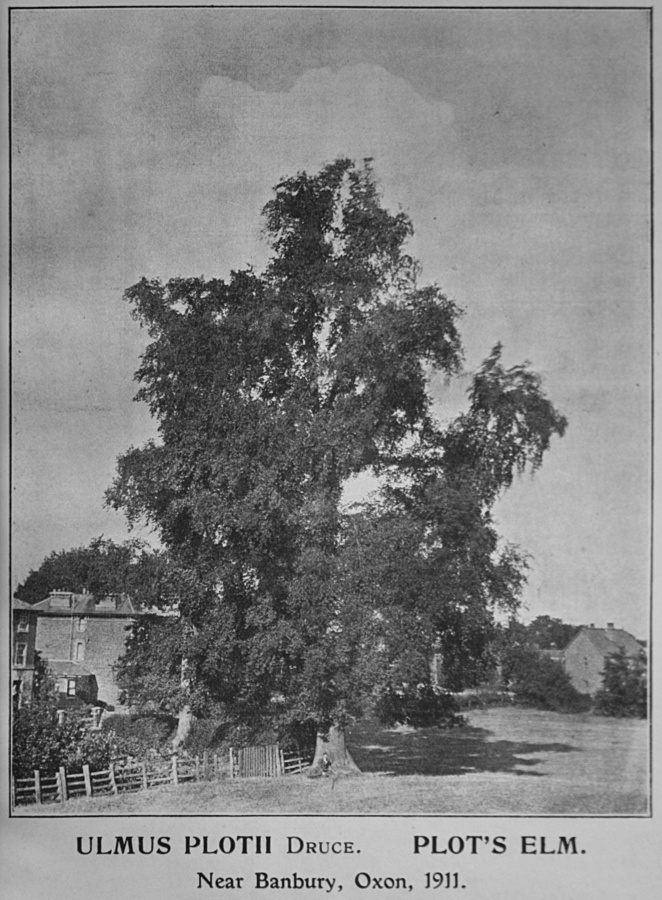
'Plotii', Banbury, 1911 (two contiguous trees)

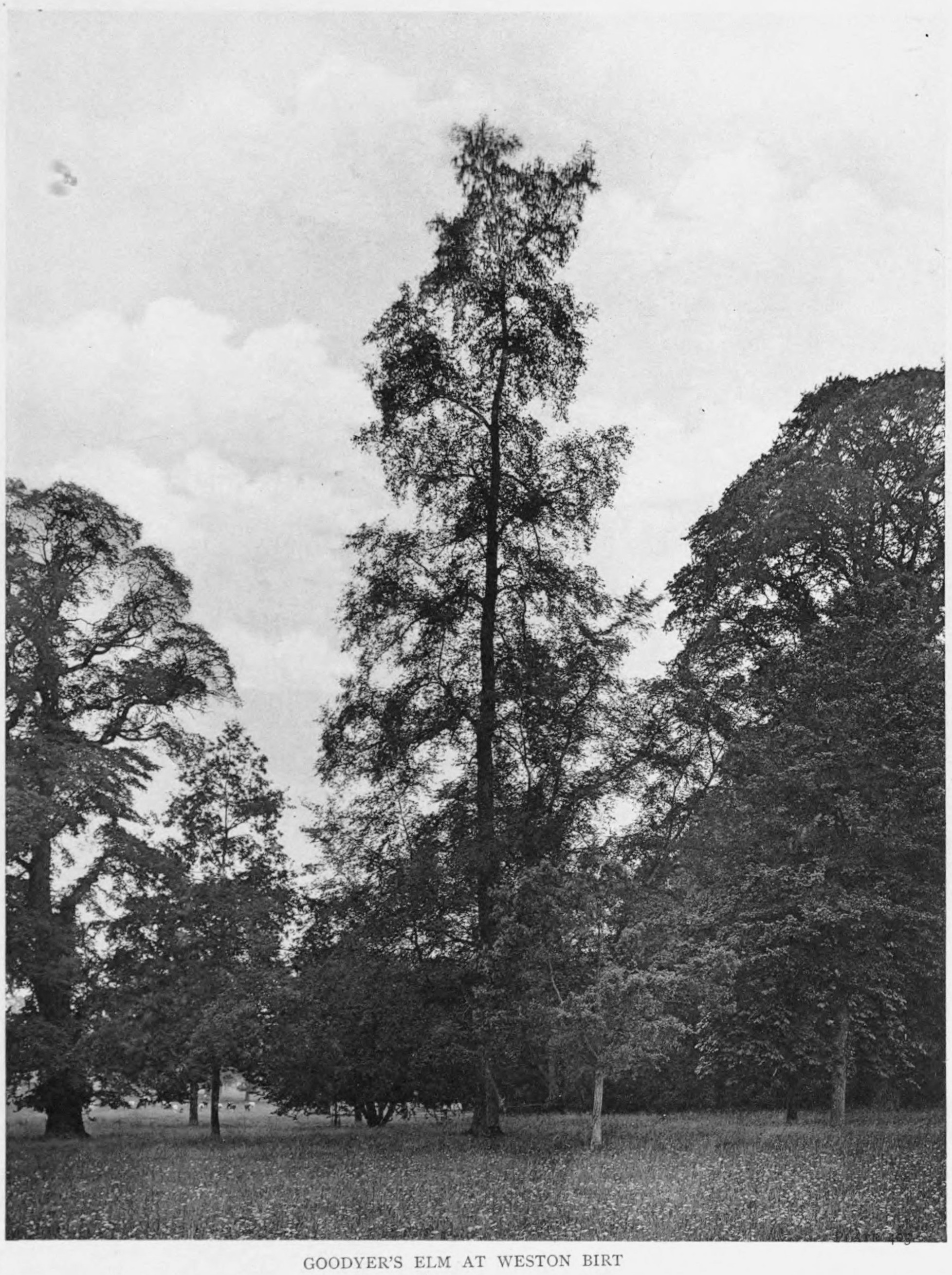
Plot elm, Westonbirt, misidentified by Henry as Goodyer's Elm, 1912

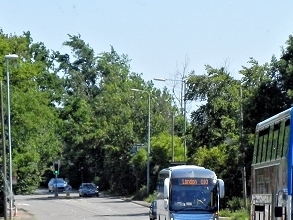
Madingley Road Plot elms, Cambridge, 2013 (felled for road-widening 2014)

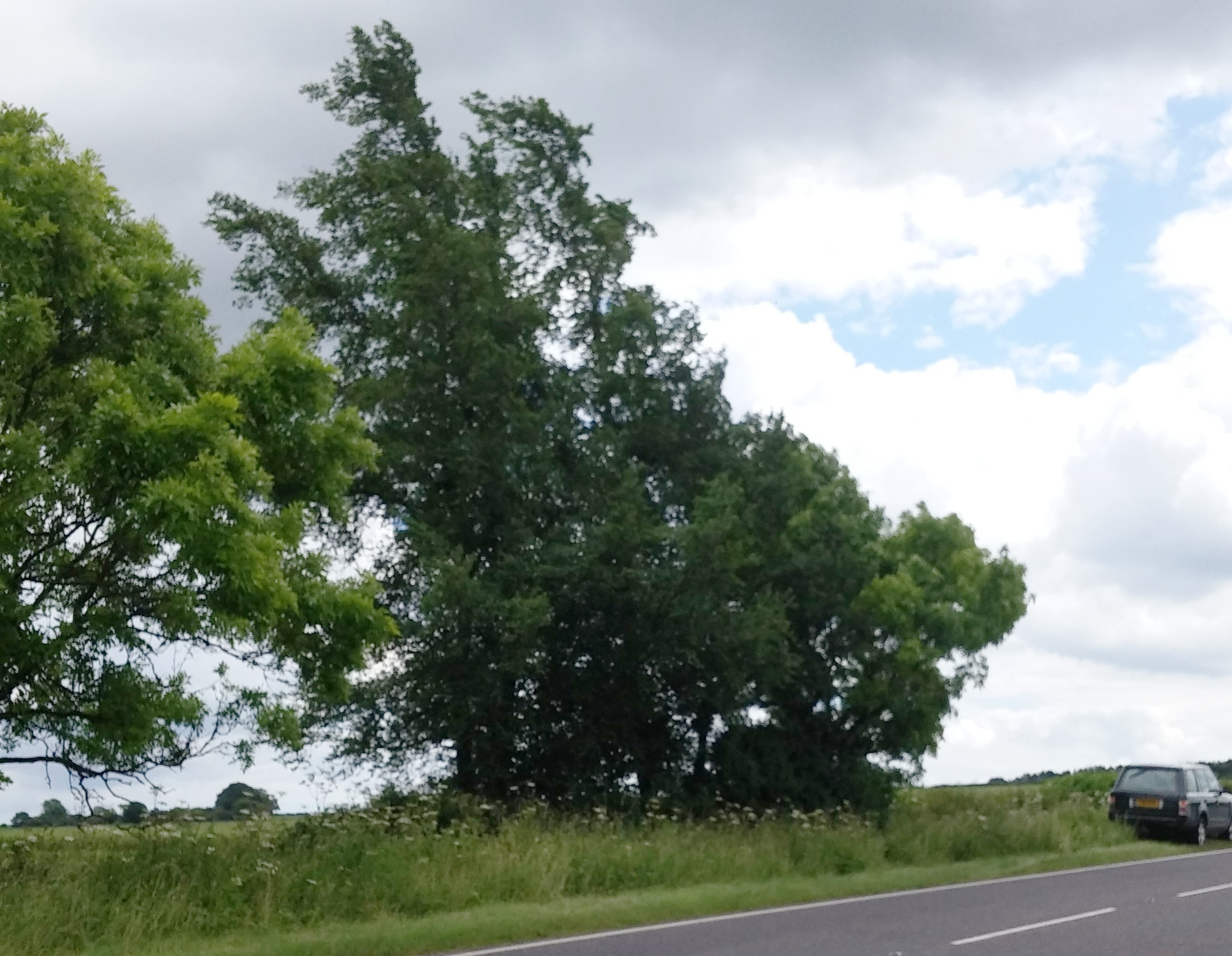
Two 'Plotii', Calceby, Lincolnshire, July 2016 (died 2019)

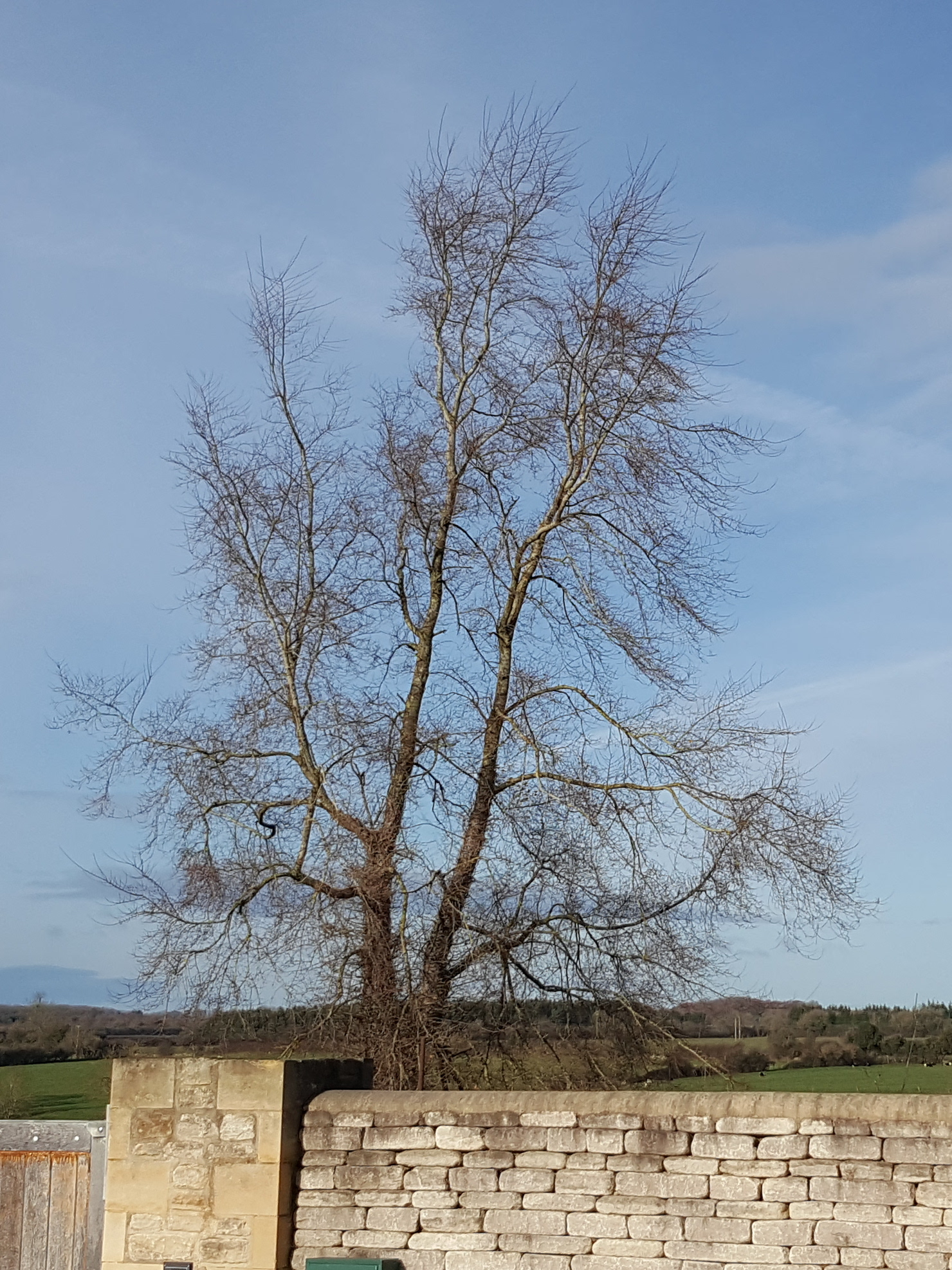
'Plotii', Ampney Crucis, Gloucestershire (2017; died 2023), near Ampney St Peter, where the notable Eastington House specimen stood

=== The Laxton court-case ===
It is likely that what the Press called "lofty Italian elms" on the village green of Laxton, Northamptonshire (later identified as a Plot hub), the felling of which in 1937 caused a fracas between conservationists and police and led to a court-case, were U. plotii, perhaps miscalled by outsiders by analogy with similarly narrow Italian poplar.

=== Putative specimen ===
A double-stemmed weakly-suckering field elm resembling Ulmus plotii, with Plot-like form, fruit, bark, tracery, leaves and semi-long shoots, stands (2025) near Starbank Park, Newhaven, Edinburgh. It was planted c.1970, at the same time as E. E. Kemp planted Plot elms in Dundee and Edinburgh Botanic Gardens, and at a time when Plot was available from Hillier's nursery. RBGE is known to have donated surplus saplings to large gardens in this area at this time.

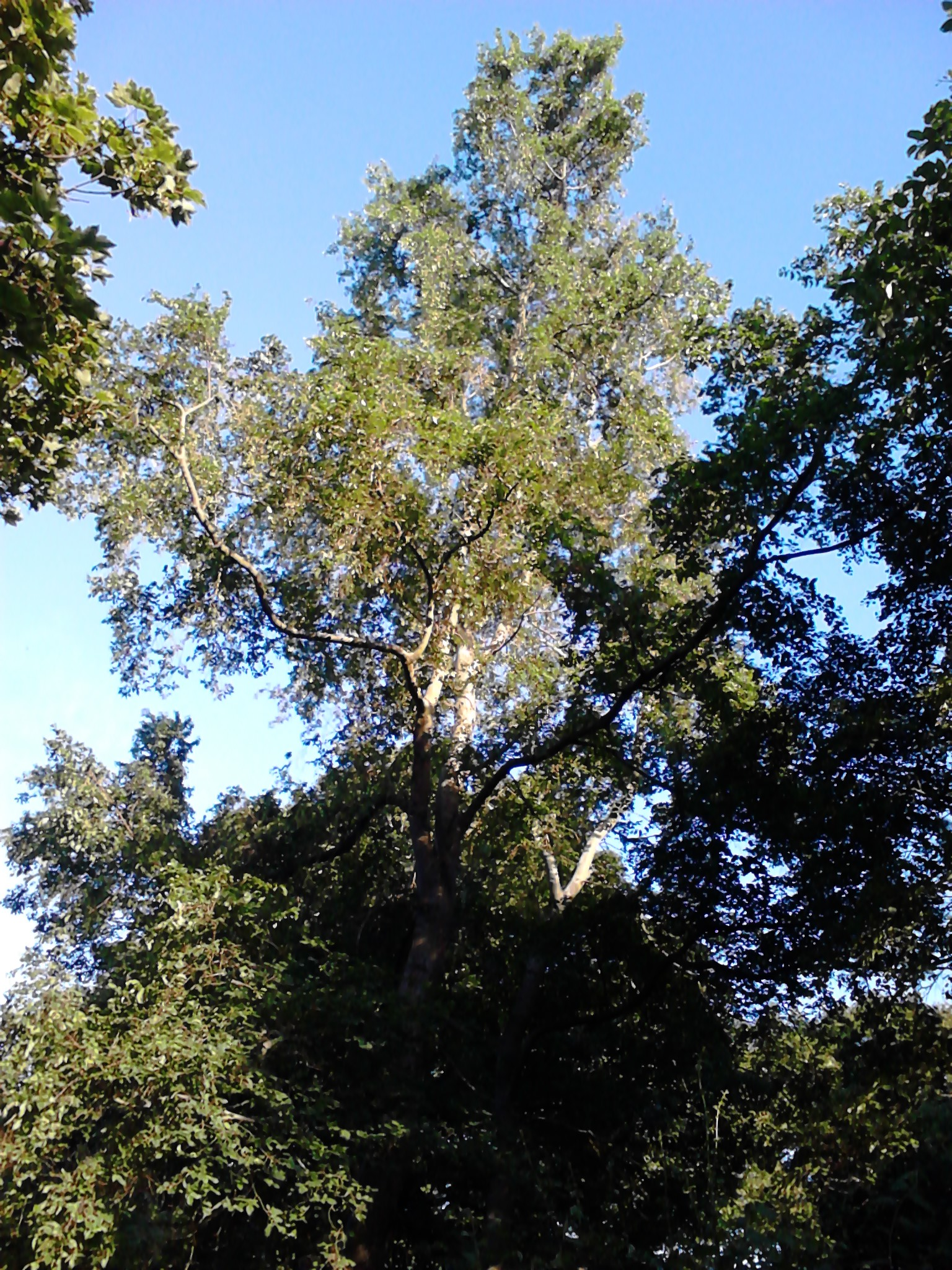
Plot-like field elm near Starbank Park, Edinburgh (2018)

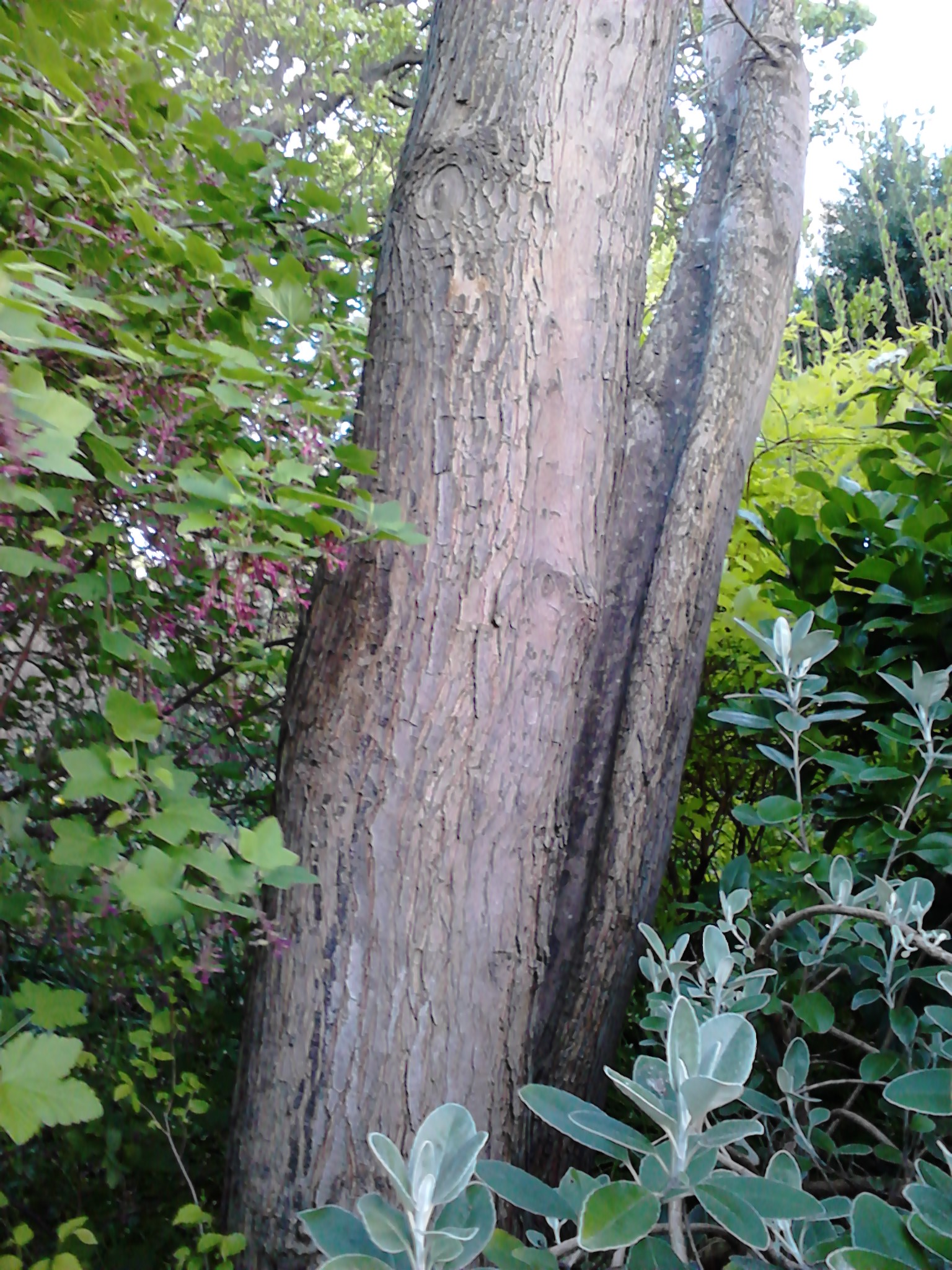
Bark of same (2017)

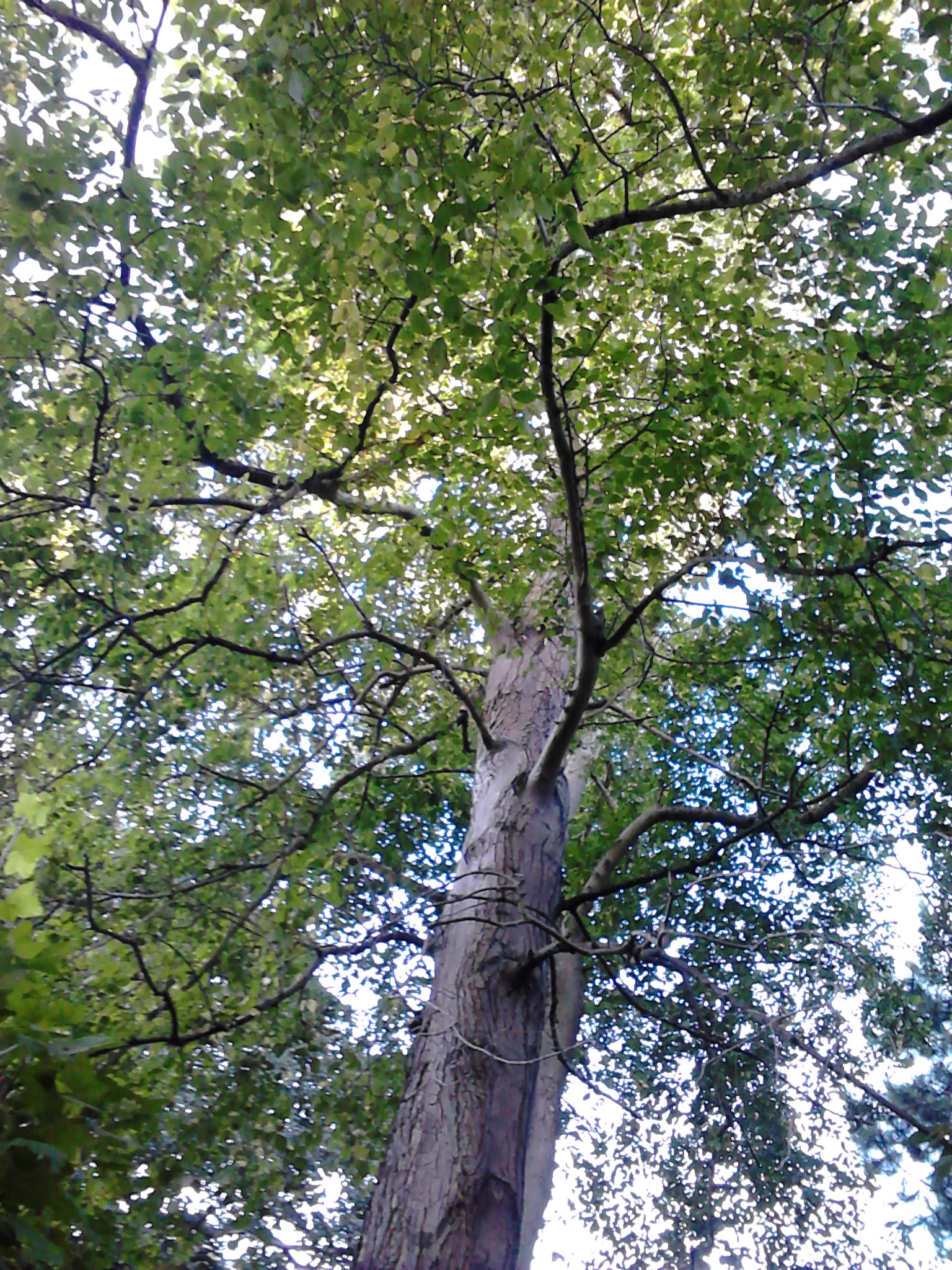
Foliage

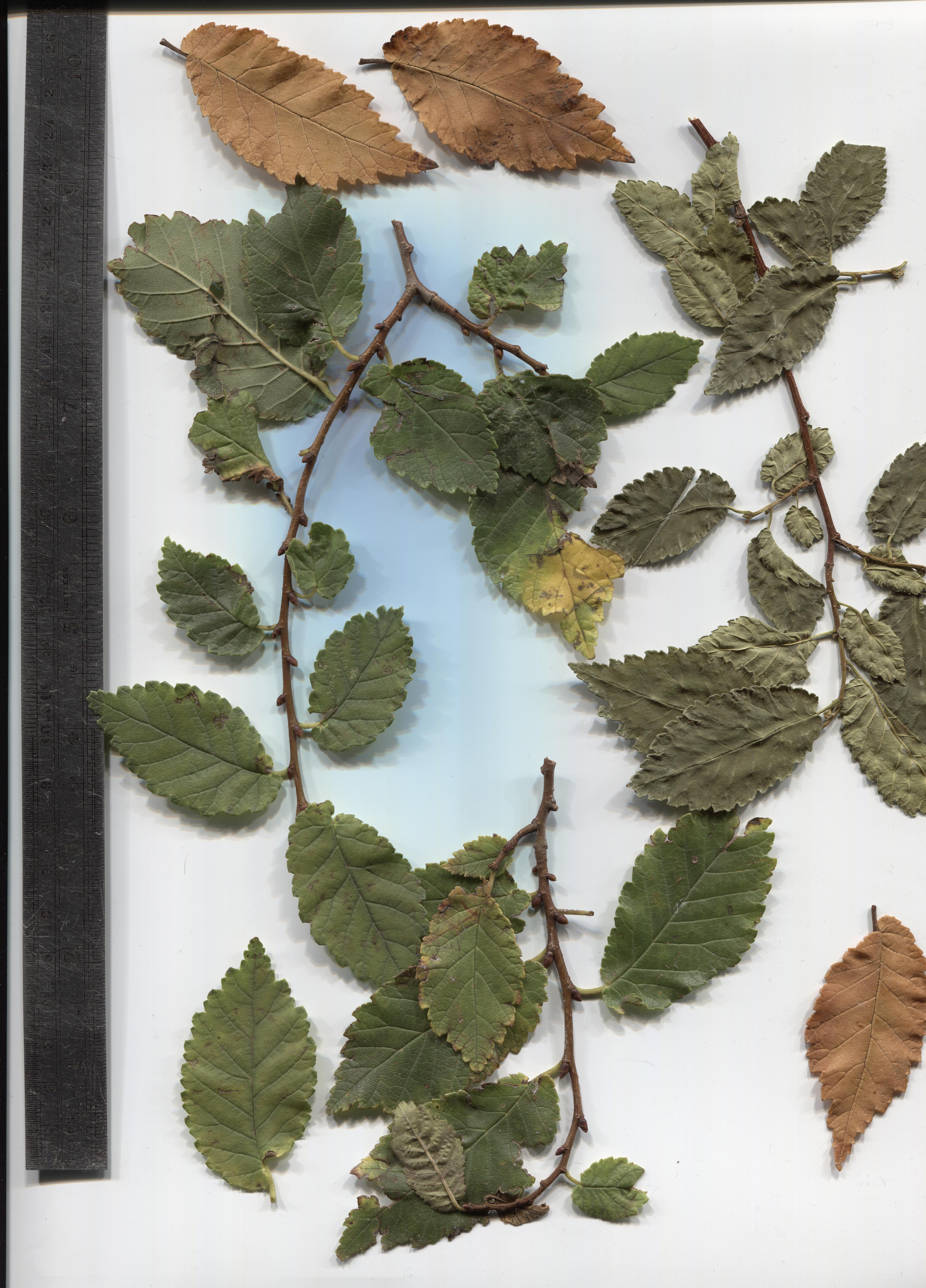
Dried leaves

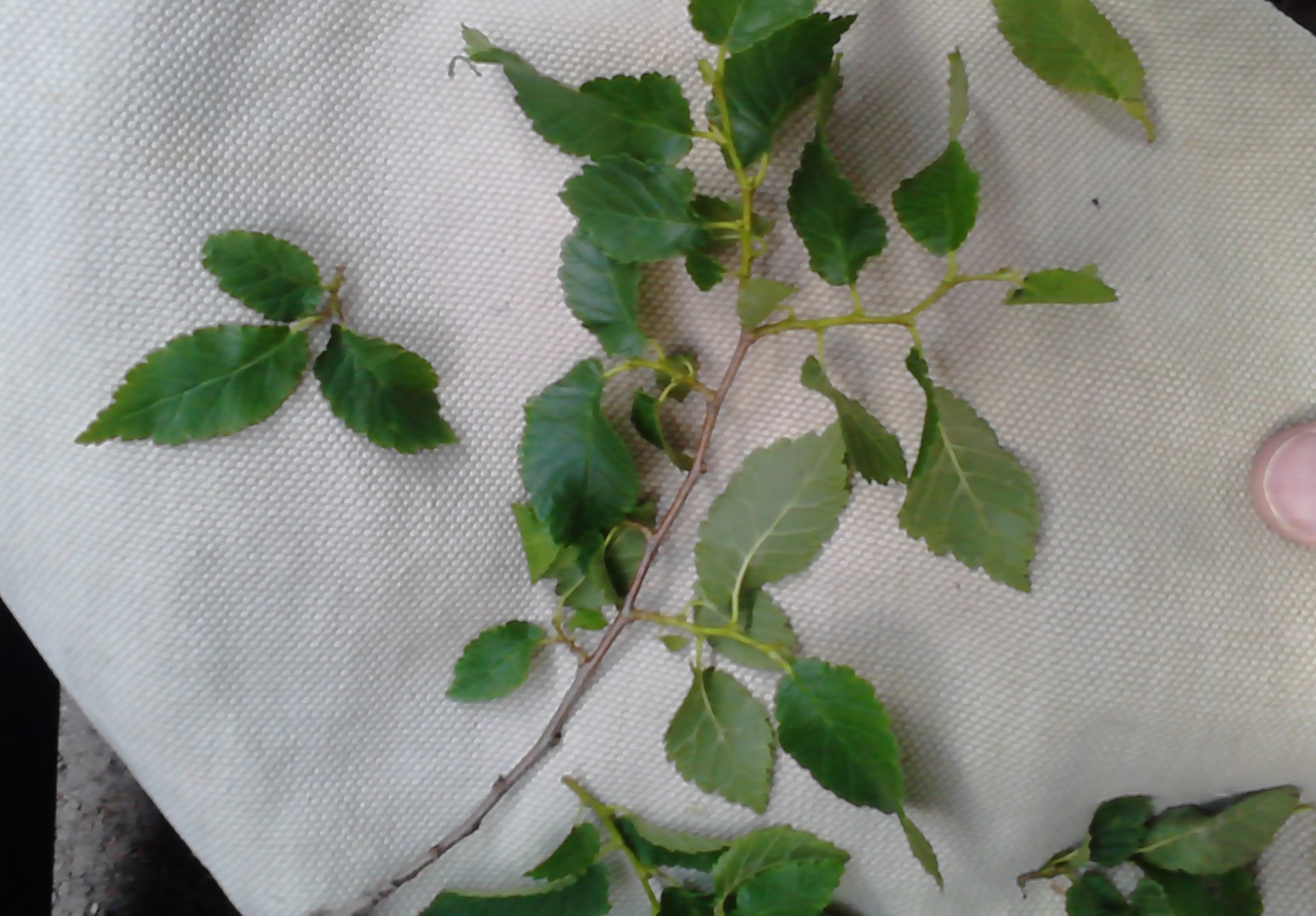
Windfall leaves

== Natural hybrids ==
Plot Elm hybridizes in the wild both with wych elm to form U. × hollandica 'Elegantissima', and with Ulmus minor subsp. minor to form Ulmus × viminalis. Melville noted that within the limits of the tree's distribution, hybrids are more common than Plot Elm itself.

== Hybrid cultivars ==
Elms of the Ulmus × viminalis group have been cultivated since the 19th century and are believed to have given rise to the cultivar of that name, 'Viminalis' (known as 'Antarctica' in Europe) and to its sports 'Aurea', 'Marginata', 'Pulverulenta'. The 19th-century cultivar 'Myrtifolia' was considered by Melville to be a probable U. minor × U. plotii hybrid. The cultivar Wentworth Elm was labelled by the Royal Botanic Garden Edinburgh, following Melville's 1958-1959 visits, as a hybrid of Ulmus × hollandica and Plot Elm. (Green claimed (1964), without citation, that Melville had identified the same Wentworth clone growing at Kew as 'Vegeta'.) The 20th-century dwarf elm cultivar 'Jacqueline Hillier' is thought to belong to the 'Elegantissima' group. Melville considered the cultivar 'Etrusca' a hybrid of U. glabra × U. plotii, and the cultivar 'Monumentalis' a hybrid of U. carpinifolia × U. plotii × U. glabra.

== In art, photography, and literature ==
George Lambert's landscape 'View of Dunton Hall, Lincolnshire', painted in 1739 near Tydd St Mary within the native range of Plot Elm, shows a narrow monopodial elm-like tree with short branches and cocked crown, that may be a rare representation of Plot Elm in art. Tydd St Mary is between the rivers Nene and Welland, by both of which Melville had noted the presence of Plot Elm.

What appear to be two Plot elms stand in the background of Ernest Arthur Rowe's painting 'Revesby Abbey, Lincolnshire, The Rose Garden' (1898). Elwes (1913) mentioned Plot elm at Hagnaby Priory, East Kirkby, near Revesby Abbey. Rowe (1863–1922) was known for his meticulous attention to botanical detail.

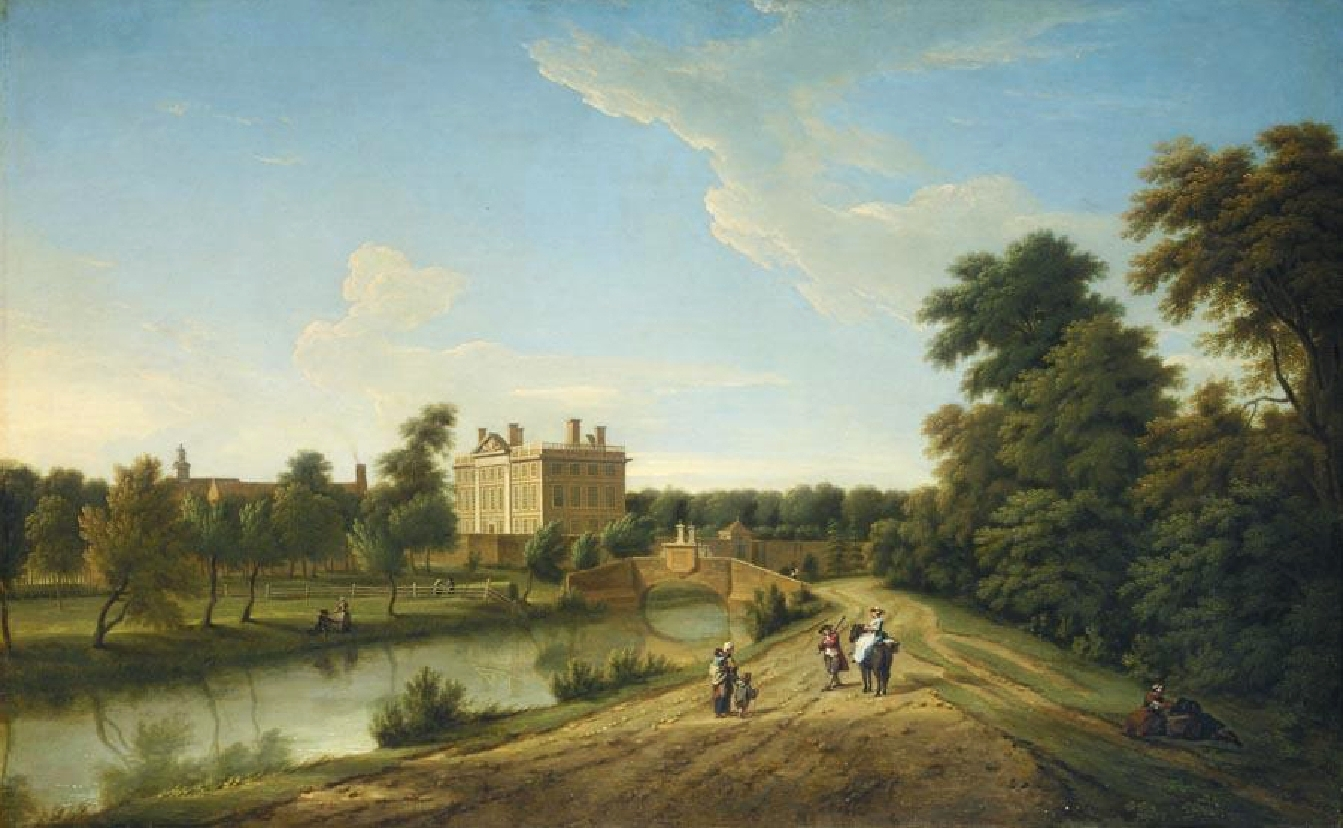
George Lambert, 'View of Dunton Hall, Lincolnshire' (1739)

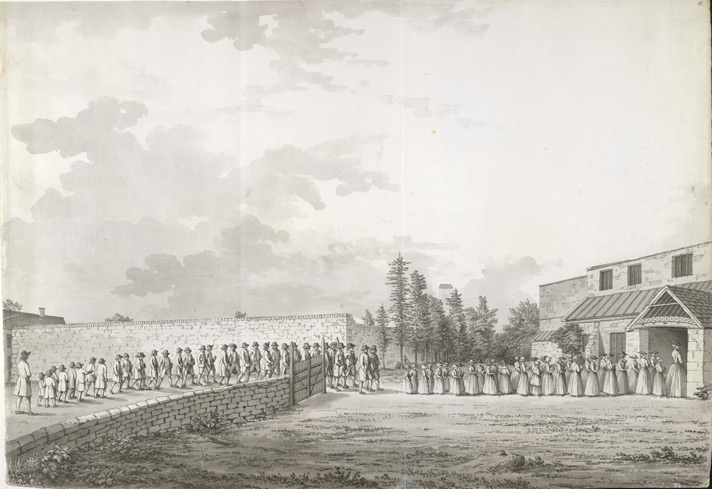
Trees at Kirkby in Ashfield, 1786, matching Stokes' 1812 description of Plot-like elms at nearby North Wingfield

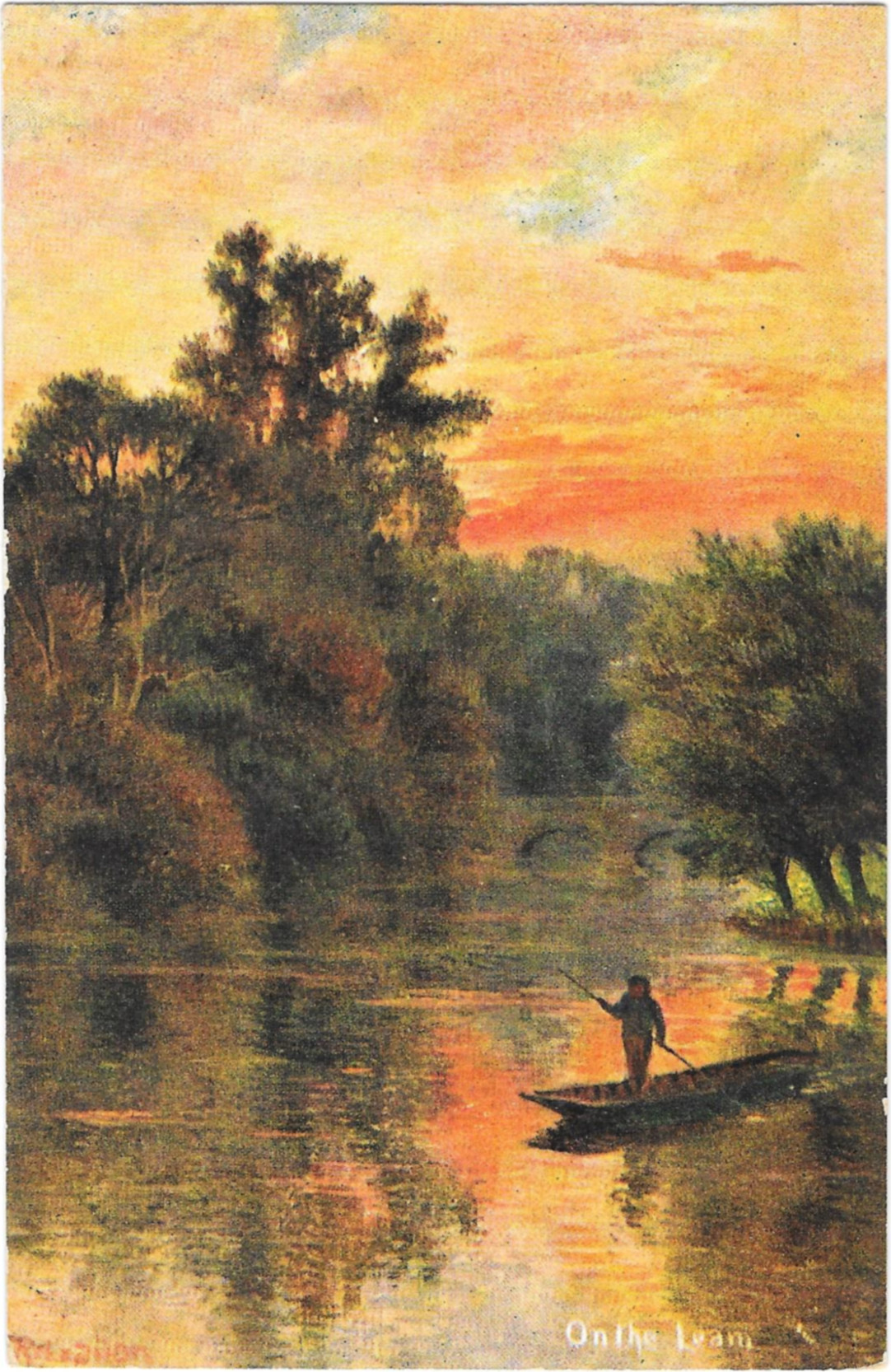
'On The Leam'. Plot elm in a postcard by Hildesheime (c.1907)

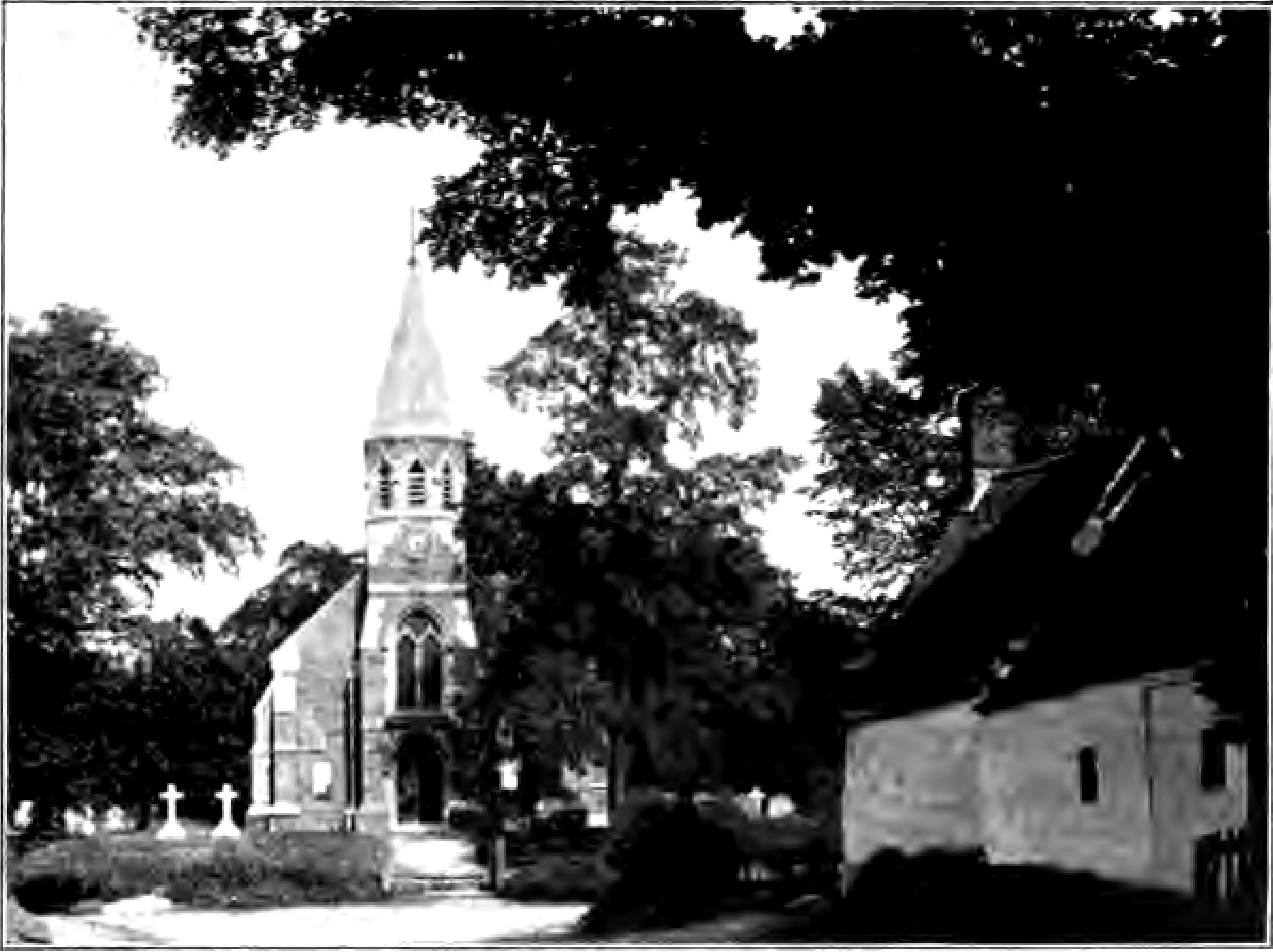
U. plotii, Thimbleby, Lincolnshire (c.1903)

... Cedric stopped the car when they were well out of the suburbs on the Hertfordshire side, at a place where a by-road ran up a slope of ploughland. At the top was a short row of elms whose crests were asymmetrical – shaped like one-sided foam on a tankard of beer, as if exposed to a prevailing breeze.

– From E. B. C. Jones, Morning and Cloud (1932).

Walter Hutchinson's four-volume Britain Beautiful (1920), a pictorial celebration of the British Isles that includes a number of elm landscapes, contains a photograph by Herbert Felton, FRPS (1888-1968) of a notable Plot elm by King's Mill, Stamford, Lincolnshire, c.1910, a tall, broad, undamaged double-stemmed tree, with long lateral boughs like a sparse-branched cedar of Lebanon. Of such well-grown specimens Melville wrote: "In old age Plot is matched by no other elm for character and individuality". Mary Neal's striking photograph of young Lock elms at Laxton, Northamptonshire, first appeared in Richens' 1956 paper 'Elms' in New Biology, among other of her elm studies.

A description in E. B. C. Jones's novel Morning and Cloud (1932) of asymmetrical elms in Hertfordshire, where Plot Elm was present, may be a rare literary reference to 'Plotii'.

== Accessions ==
Europe

- Grange Farm Arboretum, Lincolnshire, UK. As U. minor 'Plotii'. Acc. no. 1081.
- Wakehurst Place Garden, Wakehurst Place, UK, as U. plotii. Acc. no. 1912-59402, donated by Augustine Henry, acc. nos. 1975–6181, 1975–6195, all collected by Ronald Melville.
- Royal Botanic Gardens Kew, UK, as U. plotii, acc. no. 1969-16753, (planted 1958), donated by Melville.

North America

- Bartlett tree nurseries. Acc. nos. 7771, 00–108, as U. plotii, provenances not disclosed.

== Synonyms ==
- Ulmus angustissima: Edward Morgan MSS "Hortus siccus" (c.1672); Druce (1919)
- Ulmus surculosa argutifolia Stokes.
- Ulmus sativa var. Lockii Druce.
- Ulmus minor Henry (non Miller).
- Ulmus sativa Moss (non Miller).
- Ulmus Plotii Druce.
- Ulmus minor var. lockii Richens.
