= Ronald Melville (botanist) =

British botanist (1903–1985)

- Born: 12 March 1903; Bristol, England
- Died: 6 August 1985 (aged 82)
- Scientific career
- Fields: Botany
- Workplaces: Royal Botanic Gardens, Kew

Ronald Melville FLS (12 March 1903 – 6 August 1985) was an English botanist, based at the Royal Botanic Gardens Kew. He is chiefly remembered for his wartime research into rosehips as a source of vitamin C, prompted by the epidemic of scurvy amongst children owing to the reduced importation of fresh fruit. His research concluded that hips from the common Dog Rose, Rosa canina, held the highest concentration of the vitamin. In later years, he challenged the two-species taxonomy of the British elms proposed by Richens, identifying five distinct species, several varieties and numerous complex hybrids. Melville assembled a large collection of elm species, varieties and hybrids which are still growing at Royal Botanic Gardens Kew's Wakehurst site.

Melville also compiled the world's first Red Data Book, published in 1970, listing all known threatened plants. He was made a Fellow of the Linnean Society in 1938. The tree Acacia melvillei is named in his honour.

== Publications ==
- Contributions to the study of British elms. 1. What is Goodyer's Elm? The Journal of Botany, Vol. 76. July, 1938.
- Contributions to the study of British elms. 2. The East Anglian Elm. The Journal of Botany, Vol. 77. 1939
- Contributions to the study of British elms. 3. The Plot Elm, Ulmus Plotii Druce. The Journal of Botany, Vol. 78. 1940.
- The Story of Plants and their Uses to Man (co-author John Hutchinson), 1948.
- The Coritanian Elm. Journal of the Linnean Society of London, Botany, Vol. 53. 1949
- Ulmus canescens: an eastern Mediterranean Elm. Kew Bulletin: 499–502, 1957.
- The Elms of the Himalaya (co-author Hans Heybroek), Kew Bulletin No. 26 (1), 1971.
- On the discrimination of species in hybrid swarms with special reference to Ulmus and the nomenclature of U. minor (Mill.) and U. carpinifolia (Gled.). Taxon 27: 345–351, 1978.

== See also ==
- County Herb Committee
