= Ulmus wallichiana var. tomentosa =

Scientific classification
- Kingdom: Plantae
- Clade: Tracheophytes
- Clade: Angiosperms
- Clade: Eudicots
- Clade: Rosids
- Order: Rosales
- Family: Ulmaceae
- Genus: Ulmus
- Species: U. wallichiana
- Variety: U. w. var. tomentosa

Trinomial name
- Ulmus wallichiana var. tomentosa Melville & Heybroek

Variety of tree

Ulmus wallichiana var. tomentosa was identified by Melville & Heybroek after the latter's expedition to the Himalaya in 1960.

== Description ==
The tree is very similar to Ulmus wallichiana subsp. wallichiana, but distinguished by young stems and lower surfaces of leaves densely white-tomentose; the samarae are uniformly hirsute.

== Pests and diseases ==
The species has a high resistance to the fungus Ophiostoma himal-ulmi endemic to the Himalaya and the cause of Dutch elm disease there.

== Cultivation ==
The tree is not known to be in cultivation in the West.
