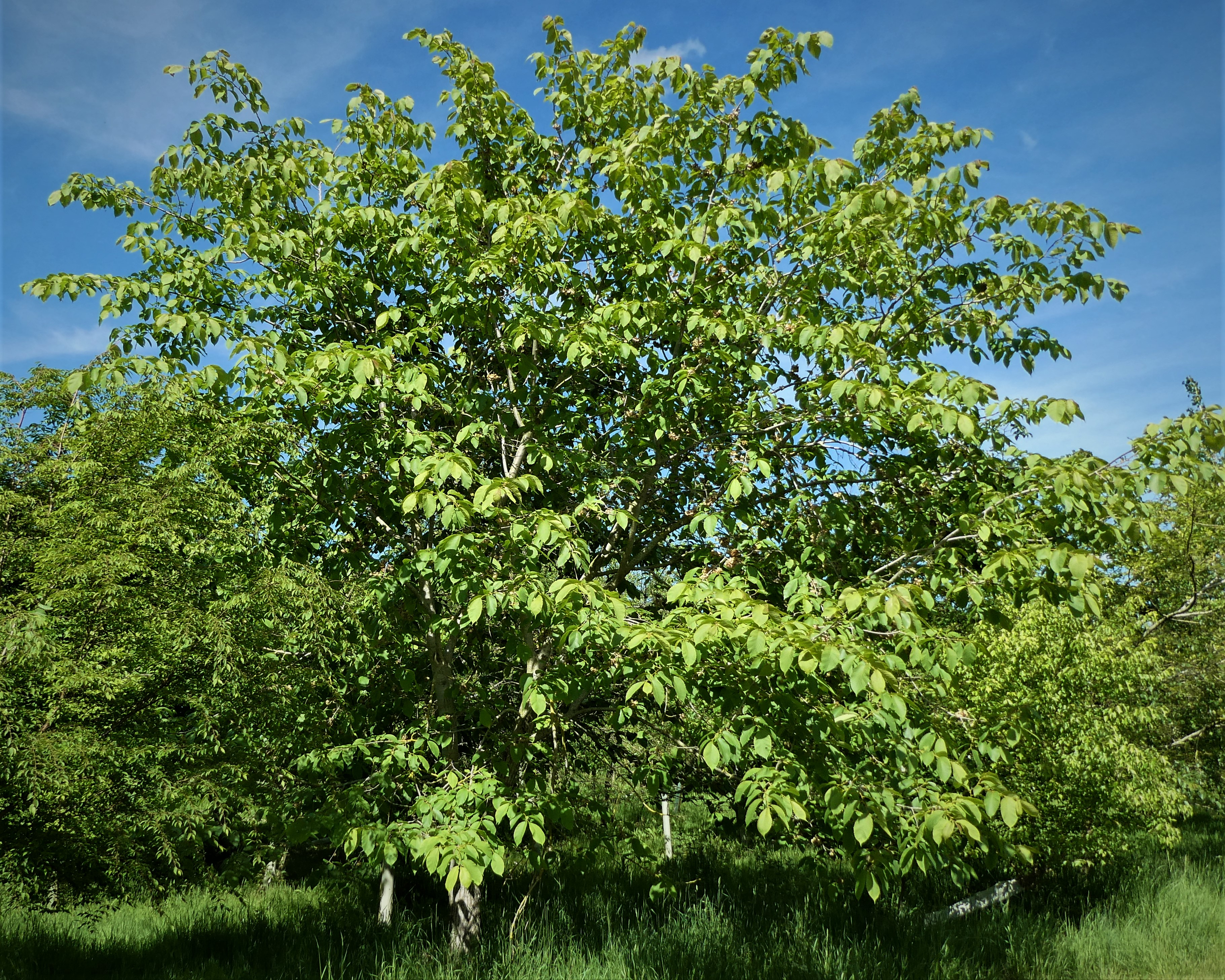

Scientific classification
- Kingdom: Plantae
- Clade: Tracheophytes
- Clade: Angiosperms
- Clade: Eudicots
- Clade: Rosids
- Order: Rosales
- Family: Ulmaceae
- Genus: Ulmus
- Species: U. wallichiana
- Subspecies: U. w. subsp. xanthoderma

Trinomial name
- Ulmus wallichiana subsp. xanthoderma Melville & Heybroek

Synonyms
- Ulmus brandisiana C. K. Schneid.

= Ulmus wallichiana subsp. xanthoderma =

Subspecies of elm

The elm Ulmus wallichiana subsp. xanthoderma was identified by Melville and Heybroek after the latter's expedition to the Himalaya in 1960. The tree is of more western distribution than subsp. wallichiana, ranging from Afghanistan to Kashmir.

== Description ==
A deciduous tree growing to 30 m with a crown comprising several ascending branches. The bark of the trunk is pale grey, coarsely furrowed longitudinally. The branchlets become orange- or yellow-brown, glandular at first, not hairy. The leaves range from 5.6–14 cm long by 3–7.5 cm broad, elliptic-acuminate in shape, and with a glabrous upper surface, on petioles 7–10 mm long. The inflorescence is slightly glandular, almost glabrous. The samarae are orbicular to obovate, with a few glandular hairs; the seed central.

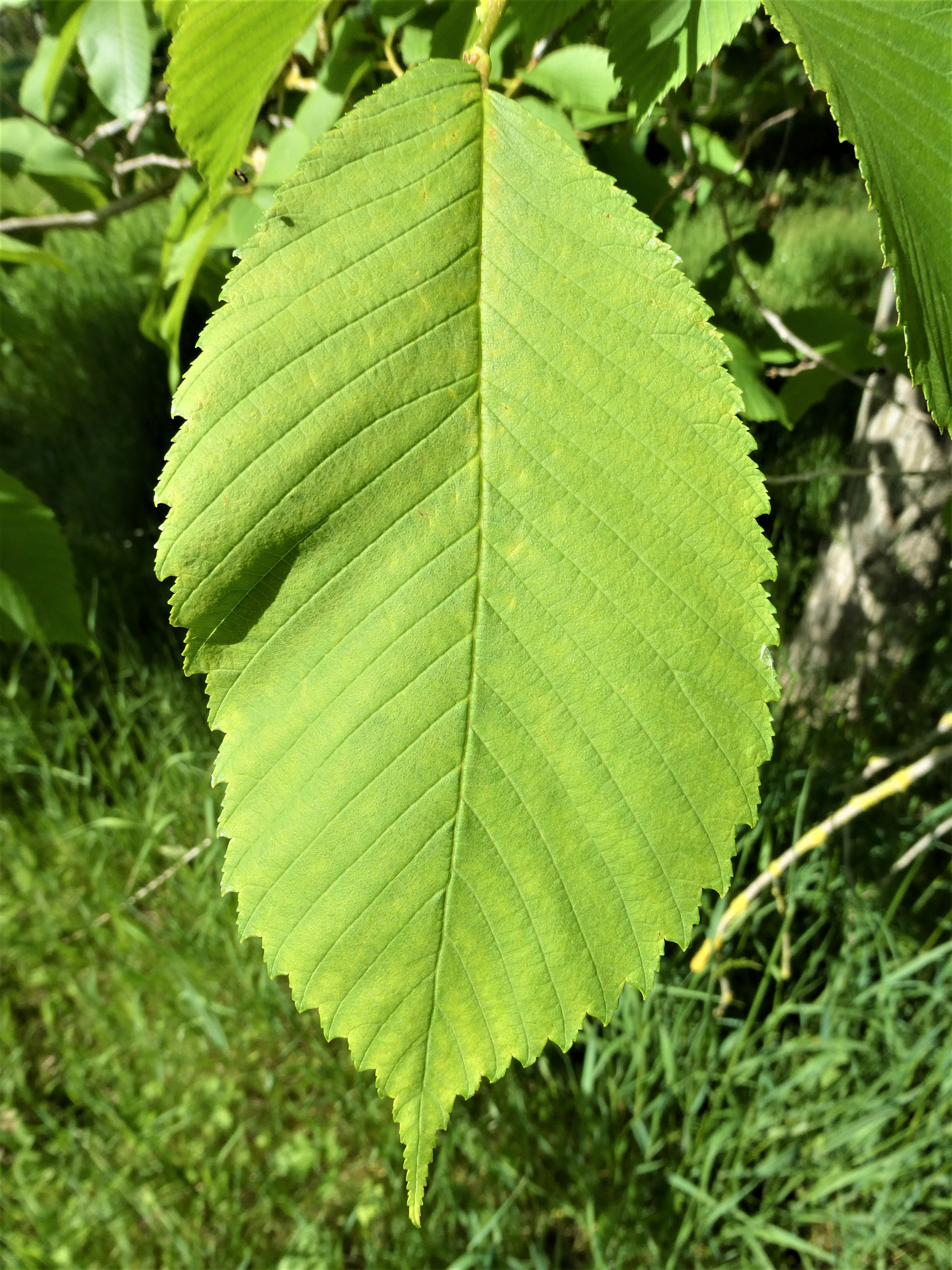
U. wallichiana ssp. xanthoderma leaf

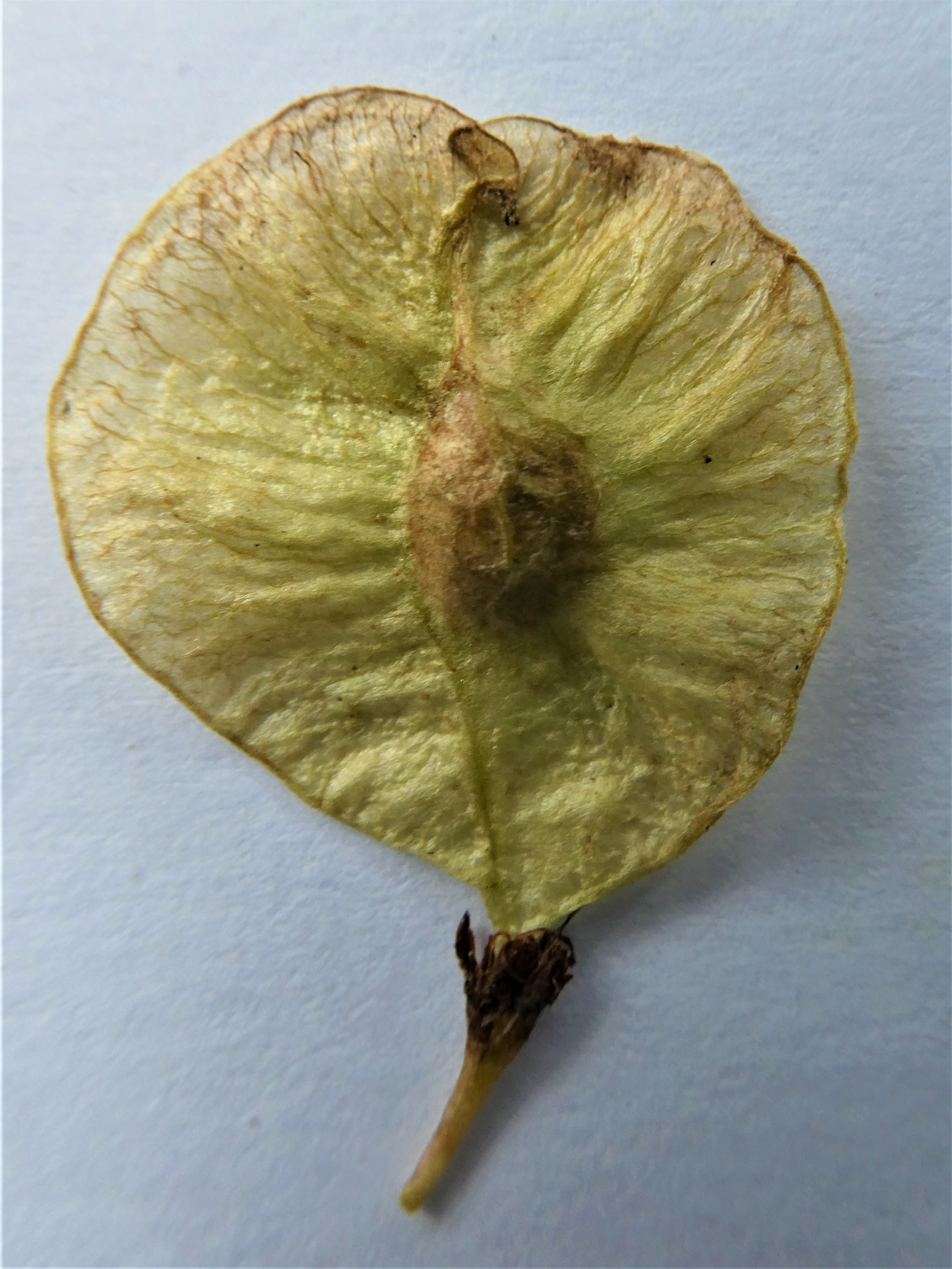
U. wallichiana ssp. xanthoderma samara

== Pests and diseases ==
The tree has a high resistance to the fungus Ophiostoma himal-ulmi endemic to the Himalaya and the cause of Dutch elm disease there.

== Cultivation ==
There are a few trees planted in England and The Netherlands. It is not known in North America or Australasia.

== Accessions ==
=== Europe ===
- Grange Farm Arboretum, Lincolnshire, UK. Acc. no. 643 (Heybroek's clone P296).
- Wijdemeren City Council Elm Arboretum, 1 tree planted Brilhoek, Nederhorst den Berg 2019, tree number: 112793
