= Ulmus × brandisiana =

Elm cultivar

- Hybrid parentage: U. chumlia × U. wallichiana
- Origin: Kashmir

Ulmus × brandisiana Melville & Heybroek is a naturally occurring elm hybrid found across the Kashmir region, arising from the crossing of Ulmus chumlia and the Himalayan elm, Ulmus wallichiana. The hybrid was formally recognized by Melville and Heybroek after the latter's expedition there in 1960.

== Description ==
The leaves are intermediate in shape between the two parents.

== Pests and diseases ==
Not known.

== Cultivation ==
The tree is not known to have been introduced to the West.

== Etymology ==
The tree is named for Sir Dietrich Brandis, the first Inspector General of Forests appointed to the sub-continent, and author of Indian Trees published in 1906. The name was earlier used by Schneider as the specific name for what was later sunk as a subspecies (xanthoderma) of the Himalayan Elm U. wallichiana. To add to the confusion, specimens of what was later named U. chumlia were treated as U. brandisiana by Augustine Henry.
