= Ulmus minor 'Virgata' =

Elm cultivar

- Species: Ulmus minor
- Cultivar: 'Virgata'
- Origin: Nangis, Seine et Marne, France

The Field Elm cultivar Ulmus minor 'Virgata' (:'twiggy') was first described, as Ulmus campestris virgata, by Pepin in Revue Horticole (1865) from a stand of some thirty trees beside a monastery at Grand-Puits near Nangis, Seine-et-Marne, said to have been planted by the friars in 1789 and propagated in 1835 by Cochet's nursery at Grisy-Suisnes. Pepin noted that in France 'Virgata' was sometimes confused with another, less vigorous elm cultivated as 'Orme pyramidal' (possibly the Baudriller nursery's 'Pyramidata' Hort.).

Not to be confused with Ulmus virgata Roxburgh (Ulmus parvifolia Jacq.) or Ulmus virgata Wallich. ex. Planch. (Ulmus chumlia Melville & Heybroek).

== Description ==
Pepin described the tree as vigorous, with short, slender, erect branches bestowing a fastigiate form. The oval pointed dark green leaves turn pale yellow in autumn and are retained late. Pepin likened the tree to cypress, Lombardy poplar and fastigiate oak.

== Pests and diseases ==
Though susceptible to Dutch Elm Disease, field elms produce suckers and usually survive in this form in their area of origin.

== Cultivation ==
In addition to the original cultivation by Cochet's of Grisy-Suisnes, Pepin himself, who described and admired the tree, planted lines of it from 1858 and recommended it for avenues. He propagated it by base-grafting.

No specimens are known to survive. In 2022 Brighton and Hove City Council listed an old twiggy elm (felled 2024) in Surrenden Road, Brighton, with up-sweeping branches, by this name, without provenance information, though 'Virgata' is not known to have been introduced to the UK and though no herbarium specimens are known. Its seed central in the samara, and its short petioles, suggest that the Brighton tree was a form of Ulmus × hollandica.

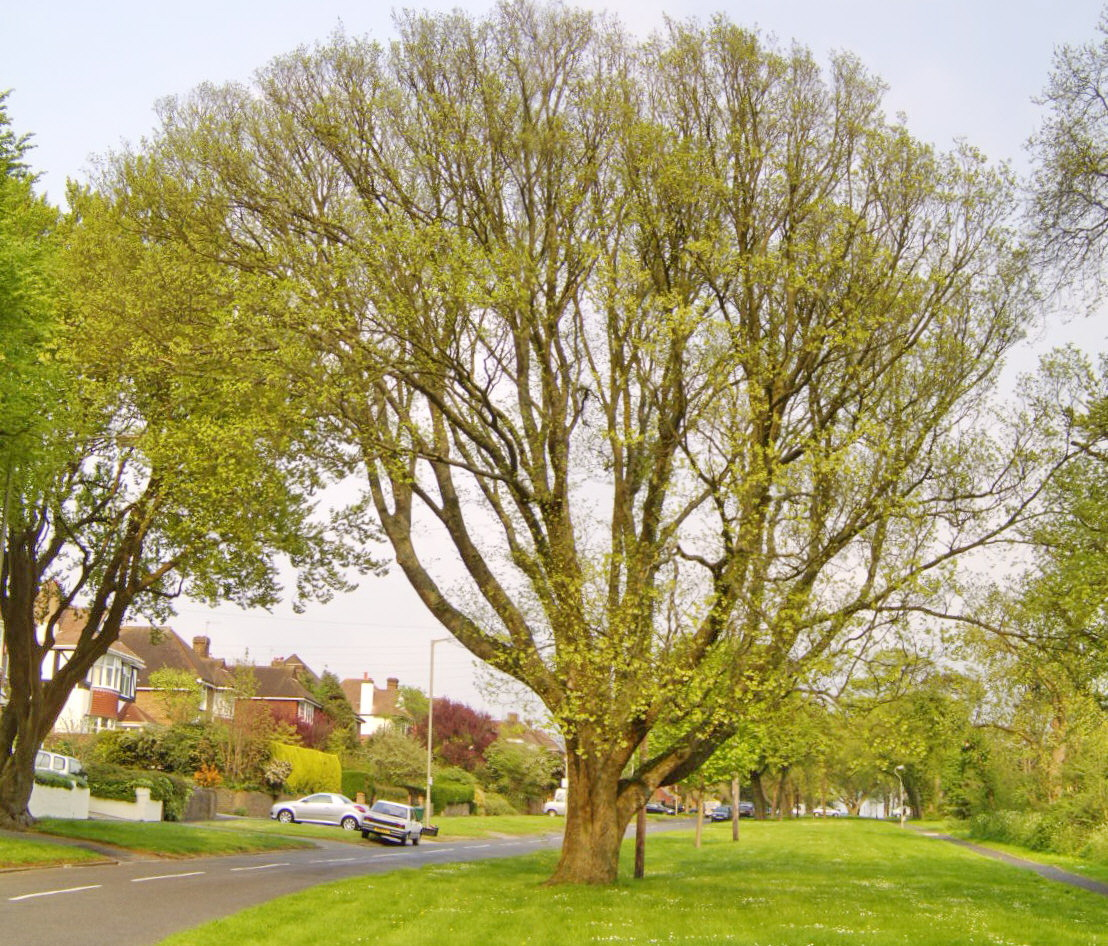
Tree opposite 175 Surrenden Rd, Brighton (2015)

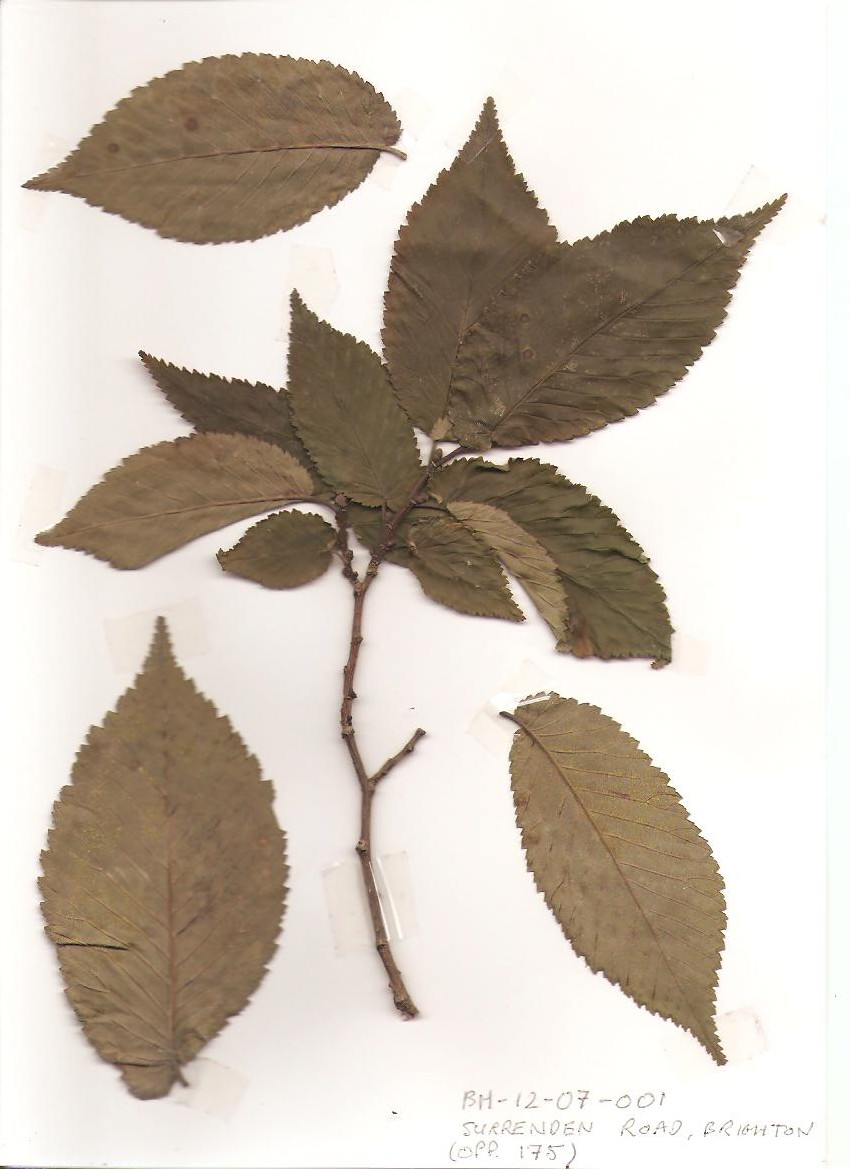
Leaves showing short petioles

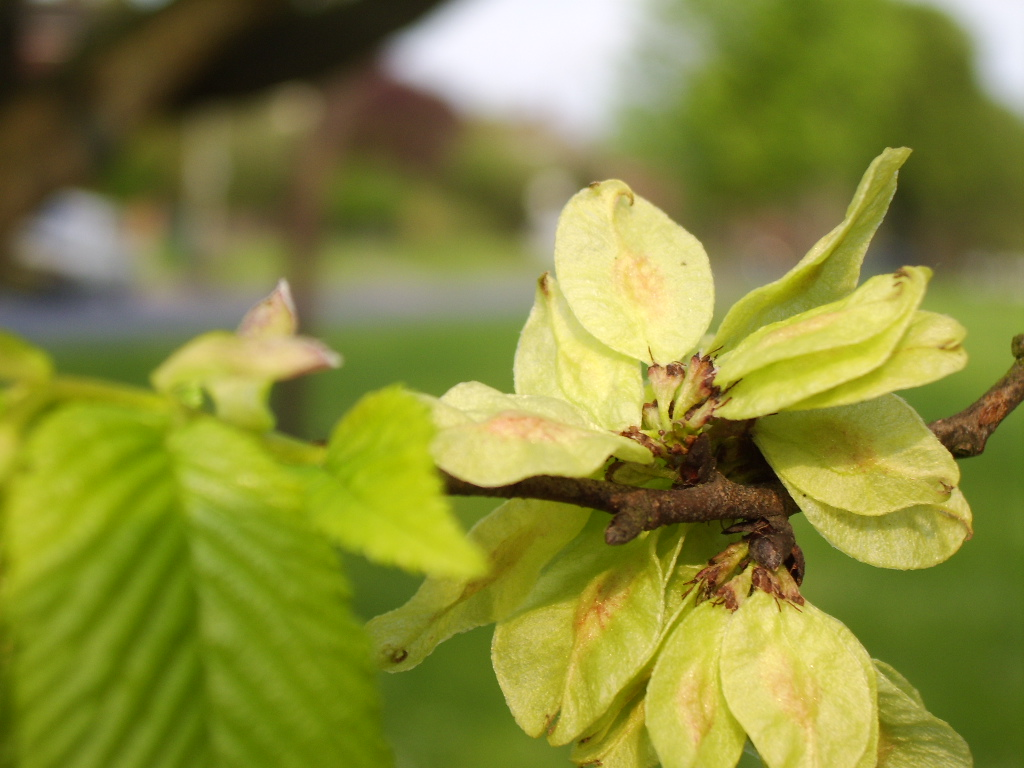
Fruit with seed central in samaras

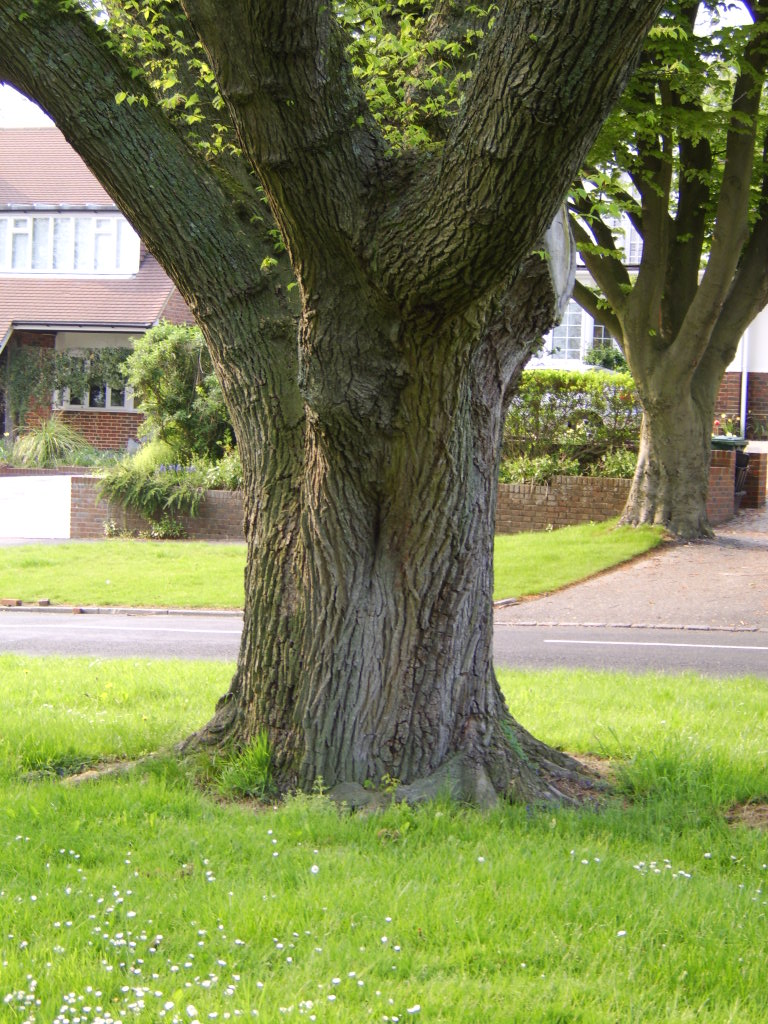
Bark
