= Ampelocera longissima =

Conservation status
- Near Threatened (IUCN 3.1)

Scientific classification
- Kingdom: Plantae
- Clade: Tracheophytes
- Clade: Angiosperms
- Clade: Eudicots
- Clade: Rosids
- Order: Rosales
- Family: Ulmaceae
- Genus: Ampelocera
- Species: A. longissima

Binomial name
- Ampelocera longissima Todzia

Species of flowering plant

Ampelocera longissima is a species of plant in the Ulmaceae family. It is endemic to Ecuador.

Its natural habitats are subtropical or tropical moist lowland forests and subtropical or tropical moist montane forests.
