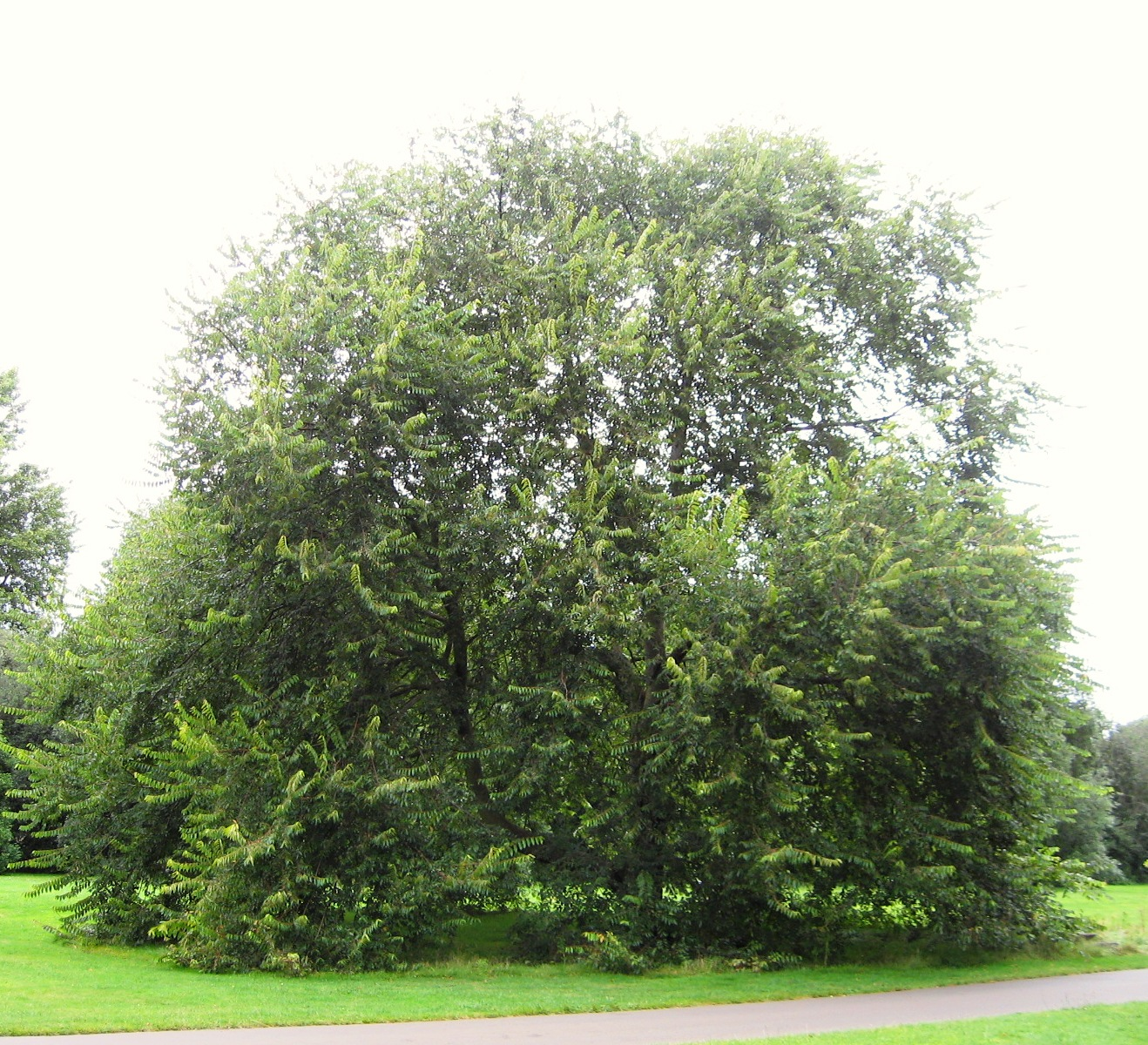
- At Kew Gardens

Conservation status
- Vulnerable (IUCN 3.1)

Scientific classification
- Kingdom: Plantae
- Clade: Tracheophytes
- Clade: Angiosperms
- Clade: Eudicots
- Clade: Rosids
- Order: Rosales
- Family: Ulmaceae
- Genus: Ulmus
- Species: U. villosa

Binomial name
- Ulmus villosa Brandis ex Gamble

Synonyms
- Ulmus laevigata Royle

= Ulmus villosa =

Species of flowering plant

Ulmus villosa, the cherry-bark elm or Marn elm, is one of the more distinctive Asiatic elms, and a species capable of remarkable longevity. It is endemic to the valleys of the Kashmir at altitudes of 1,200–2,500 metres (3,900–8,200 feet) but has become increasingly rare owing to its popularity as cattle fodder. Mature trees are now largely restricted to temples and shrines where they are treated as sacred. Some of these trees are believed to be over 800 years old.

== Description ==
Growing up to 25 metres (82 feet) high, the tree is rather lightly and pendulously branched, the bark smooth with distinctive horizontal bands of lenticels, although it eventually becomes very coarsely furrowed. The oblong-elliptic-acute leaves are less than 11 centimetres (4 1/4 inches) long by 5 cm (2 in) broad. The wind-pollinated apetalous flowers appear in spring, and are particularly densely clustered, the white hairs covering the perianth and ovary contrasting with the purplish anthers. The samarae are elliptic, less than 12 millimetres (1/2 in) long and densely hairy on both sides.

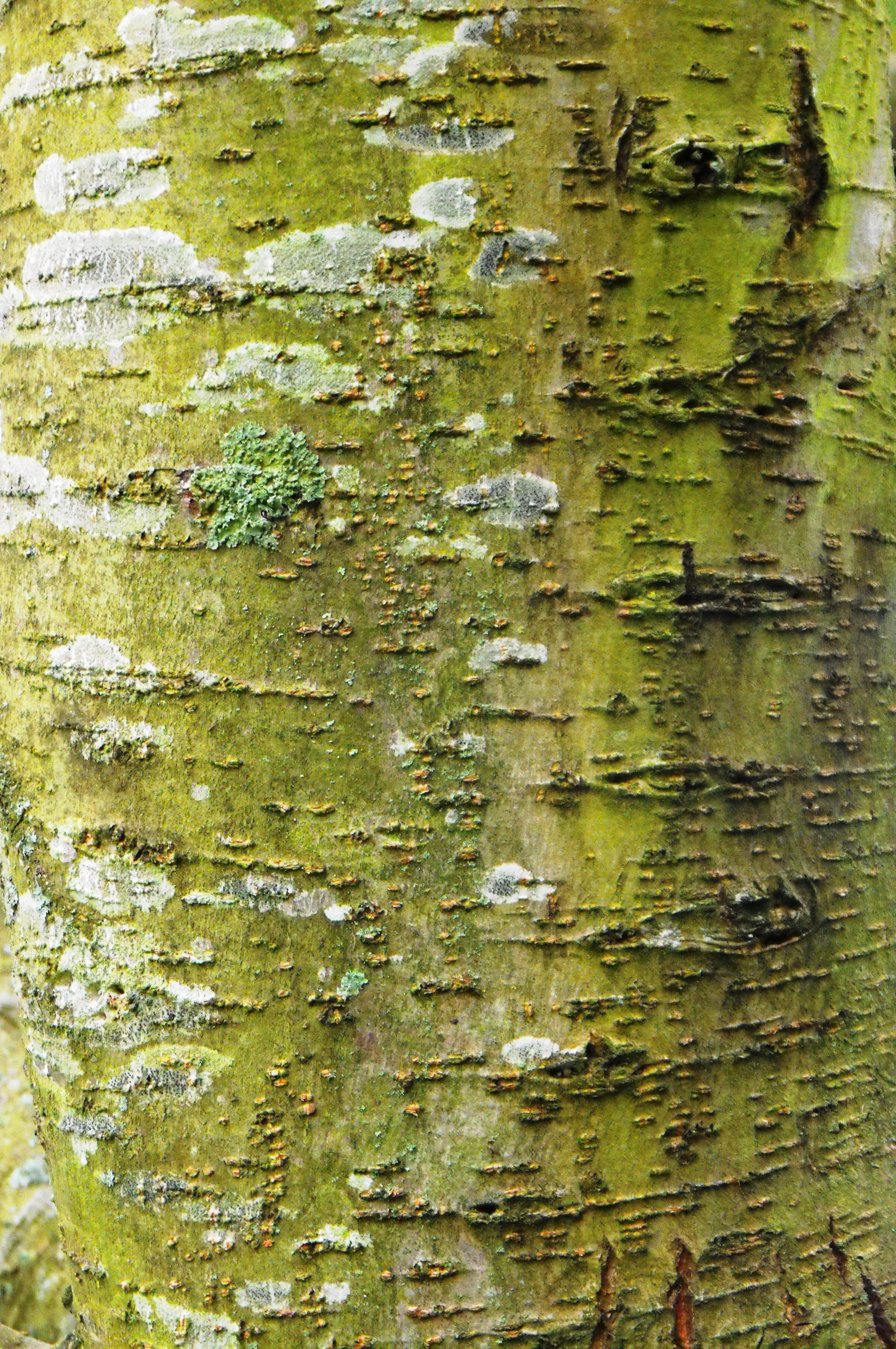
Bark

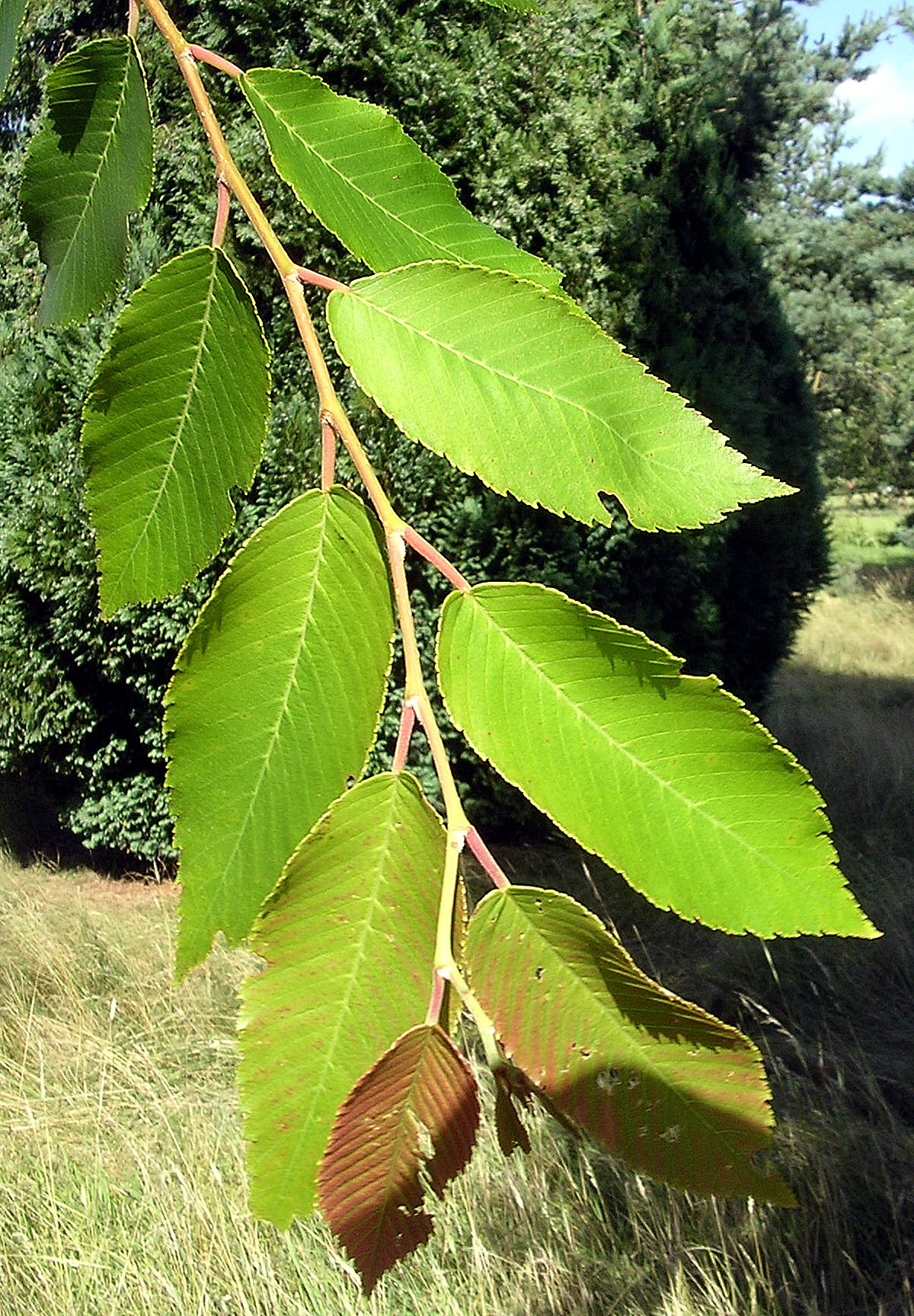
Leaves

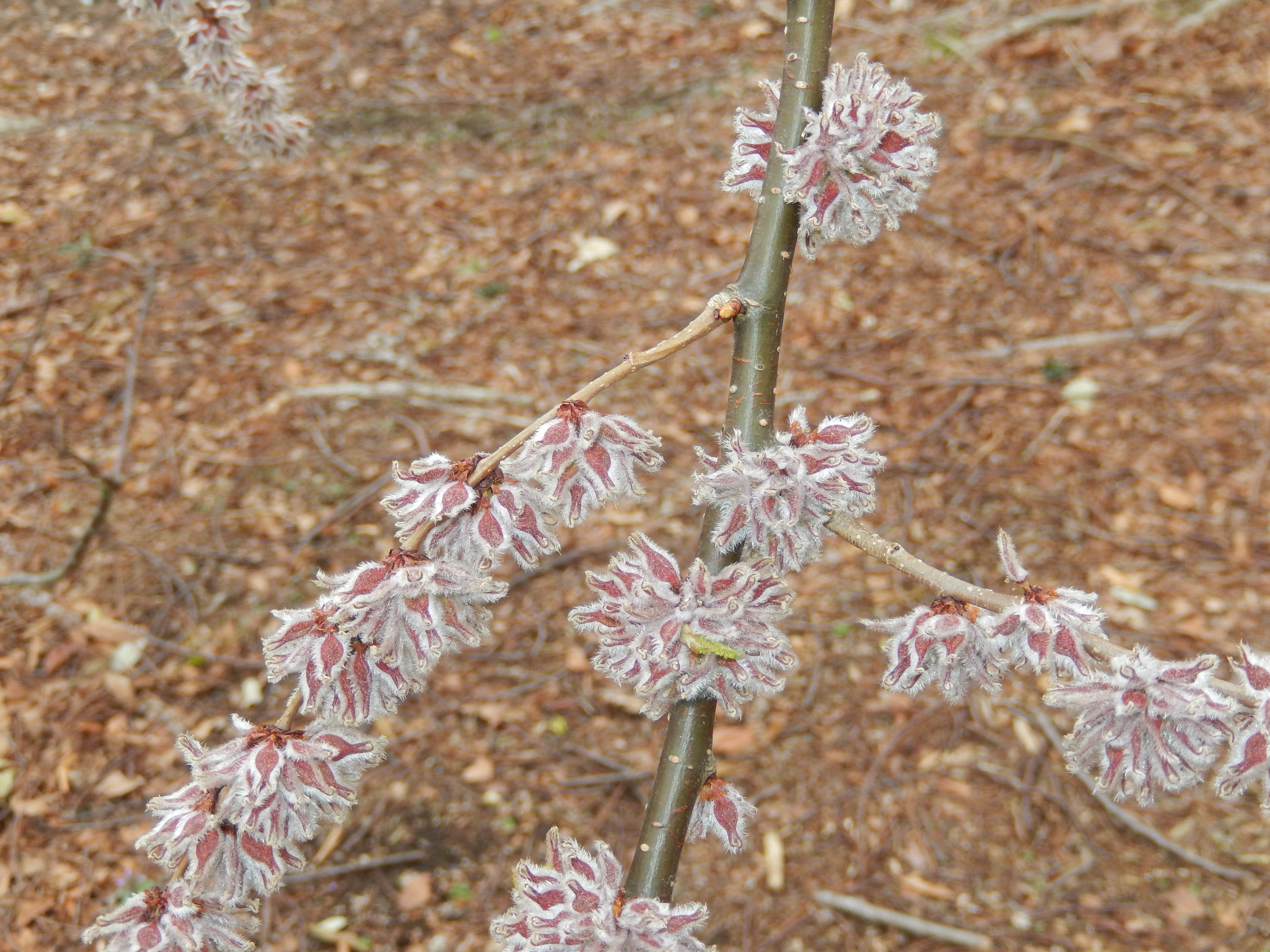
Samarae

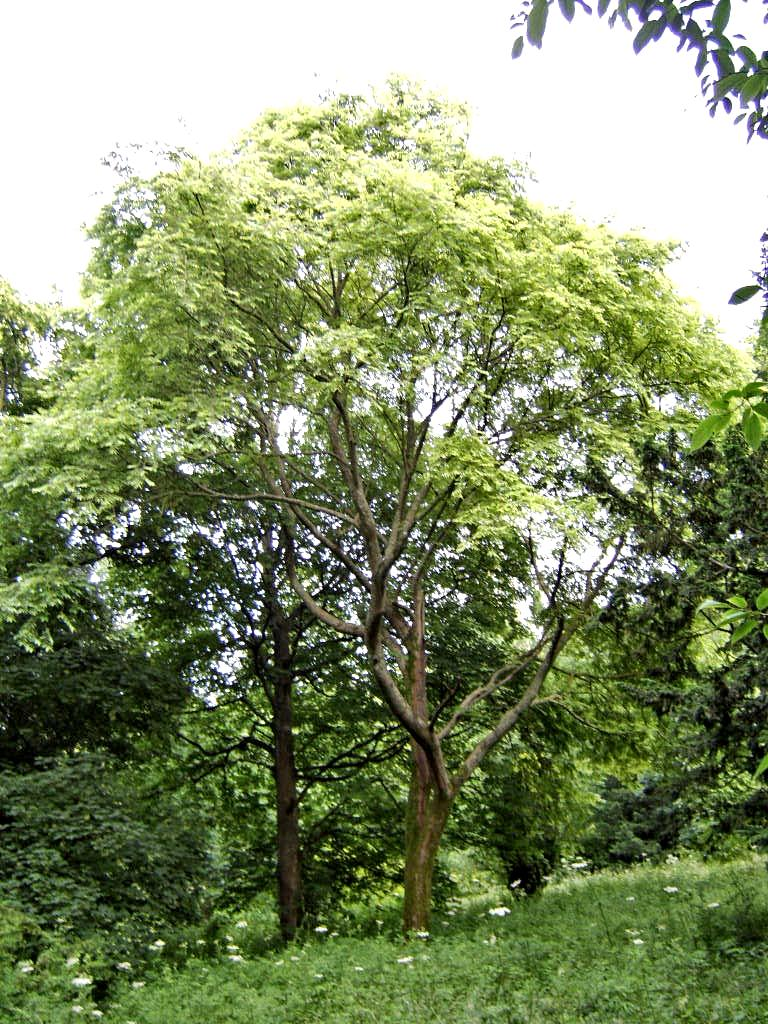
Tree at Stanmer Park Arboretum, Brighton

== Ecology ==
U. villosa has a low susceptibility to Dutch elm disease and the elm leaf beetle (Xanthogaleruca luteola), but a moderate susceptibility to elm yellows.

== Cultivation ==
A tree once grown at Kew Gardens, London, planted in 1935, attained a height of 29 m (95 ft) (bole girth 86 cm) and was considered very elegant, although it tended to shed shoots after flowering heavily; it was felled in the early 1990s after succumbing to Dutch elm disease. Two trees planted as part of the UK Forestry Commission's elm trials at the Westonbirt Arboretum in the 1970s also died, although the cause of death has not been recorded. The tree was propagated and marketed by the Hillier & Sons nursery, Winchester, Hampshire from 1971 to 1977, with sales totalling 38.

Plantings elsewhere in Europe are few and far between. A line of more than 20 trees survives at Wageningen in the Netherlands, collected by Heybroek in the Himalayas in 1960. Several trees also survive in the Gijsbrecht-Amstelpark area of Amsterdam and in the port. One U. villosa was planted in 2018 in De Vijnen park, Nederhorst den Berg, and a second in the garden of the Loosdrecht town hall, as part of Wijdemeren City Council's elm collection.A ten year-old U. villosa was planted in 2024 at the entrance to the Hortus Botanicus, Amsterdam, to replace the 120 year-old 'Belgica' felled there by a storm in 2023.

== Notable trees ==
In the UK, the Tree Register (TROBI) champions are at Bute Park, Cardiff, 21 m (69 ft) × 45 cm (18 in) diameter at breast height (dbh) in 2005, and two at Brighton, both 15 m (49 ft) × 65 cm (26 in) dbh in 2009. The specimen planted in 1989 at the Sir Harold Hillier Gardens at an exposed location on clay has grown more in width than height to form an amorphous (albeit healthy) mound of vegetation; in 2005 it was 11.6 m (38 ft) × 38 cm (15 in) dbh.

== Accessions ==
=== North America ===
- Bartlett Tree Experts, US. . Acc. no. 8384.

=== Europe ===
- Brighton & Hove City Council, UK. NCCPG Elm Collection. TROBI champion: Hodshrove Place, 15 m × 65 cm dbh in 2009.
- Grange Farm Arboretum, Lincolnshire. UK. Acc. no. 707.
- Royal Botanic Gardens, Kew, UK. Acc. no. 1935-69805. Planted in 1989, a repropagation of the original 1935 introduction to Kew.
- Royal Botanic Gardens Wakehurst Place, UK. Acc. nos. 1935-69807, 1935-69809.
- Sir Harold Hillier Gardens, Romsey, Hampshire, UK. Acc. no. 1989.2869, wild-collected from Sundarnagar Forest, Himachal Pradesh, India.
- Hortus Botanicus, Amsterdam, one tree at entrance, planted 2024.

== Nurseries ==
=== Europe ===
- Pan-Global Plants , Frampton-on-Severn, Gloucestershire, UK.
