= Phyllostylon orthopterum =

Conservation status
- Vulnerable (IUCN 2.3)

Scientific classification
- Kingdom: Plantae
- Clade: Tracheophytes
- Clade: Angiosperms
- Clade: Eudicots
- Clade: Rosids
- Order: Rosales
- Family: Ulmaceae
- Genus: Phyllostylon
- Species: P. orthopterum

Binomial name
- Phyllostylon orthopterum Hallier f.

Species of flowering plant

Phyllostylon orthopterum is a species of plant in the family Ulmaceae. It is endemic to Bolivia. It is threatened by habitat loss.
