= Ampelocera hottlei =

Scientific classification
- Kingdom: Plantae
- Clade: Tracheophytes
- Clade: Angiosperms
- Clade: Eudicots
- Clade: Rosids
- Order: Rosales
- Family: Ulmaceae
- Genus: Ampelocera
- Species: A. hottlei

Binomial name
- Ampelocera hottlei (Standl.) Standl.

Synonyms
- Celtis hottlei Standl.

Species of flowering plant

Ampelocera hottlei is a species of neotropical trees in the Ulmaceae family.

== Description ==
Trees 10–30 m tall; trunk 10–50 cm dbh, with narrow buttresses ca. 2 m tall; bark smooth, white to gray with dark lenticels. Branchlets light brown-gray, lenticellate; stipules ca. 4 mm long. Petioles 0.6-1.2 cm long; leaf blades, oblong to elliptic, 7–26 cm long, 2.6-10.5 cm wide, apex acuminate, base obliquely attenuate to rounded, margins entire, chartaceous to subcoriaceous when dry, dull dark green above, dull light green beneath, glabrous and smooth on both sides, lateral veins 3-5, palmately veined at the base of the leaf blade.

Inflorescences axillary compound dichasia, 1-2.5 cm long, with 8-17 flowers, the perfect flowers toward the apex and staminate flowers toward the base. Flowers purplish to yellowish green, puberulent bracteoles 1–2 mm long; calyx 1–2 mm long, with 5 lobes, externally puberulent; stamens ca. 16 in perfect flowers, ca. 8 in staminate flowers; stamens ca. 3 mm long; ovary puberulent, style branches ca. 4 mm long. Fruits yellow, obovoid, 1.2-1.5 cm tall, 1-1.2 cm wide, velutinous, with persistent style.

== Distribution and habitat ==
A. hottlei occurs from central Mexico to Nicaragua in primary rainforest or tropical wet forest.

== Phenology ==
Flowering reported from February and fruiting from March to June.

== Vernacular names ==
- Mexico: coquito, cautivo, guaya, ojoche blanco, popo mojo.
- Belize: bullhoof, luin.
- Guatemala: luin, tison.
- El Salvador: tison.
- Nicaragua: cuscano, yayo.

== Uses ==
Wood suitable for construction and making of railroad ties.
