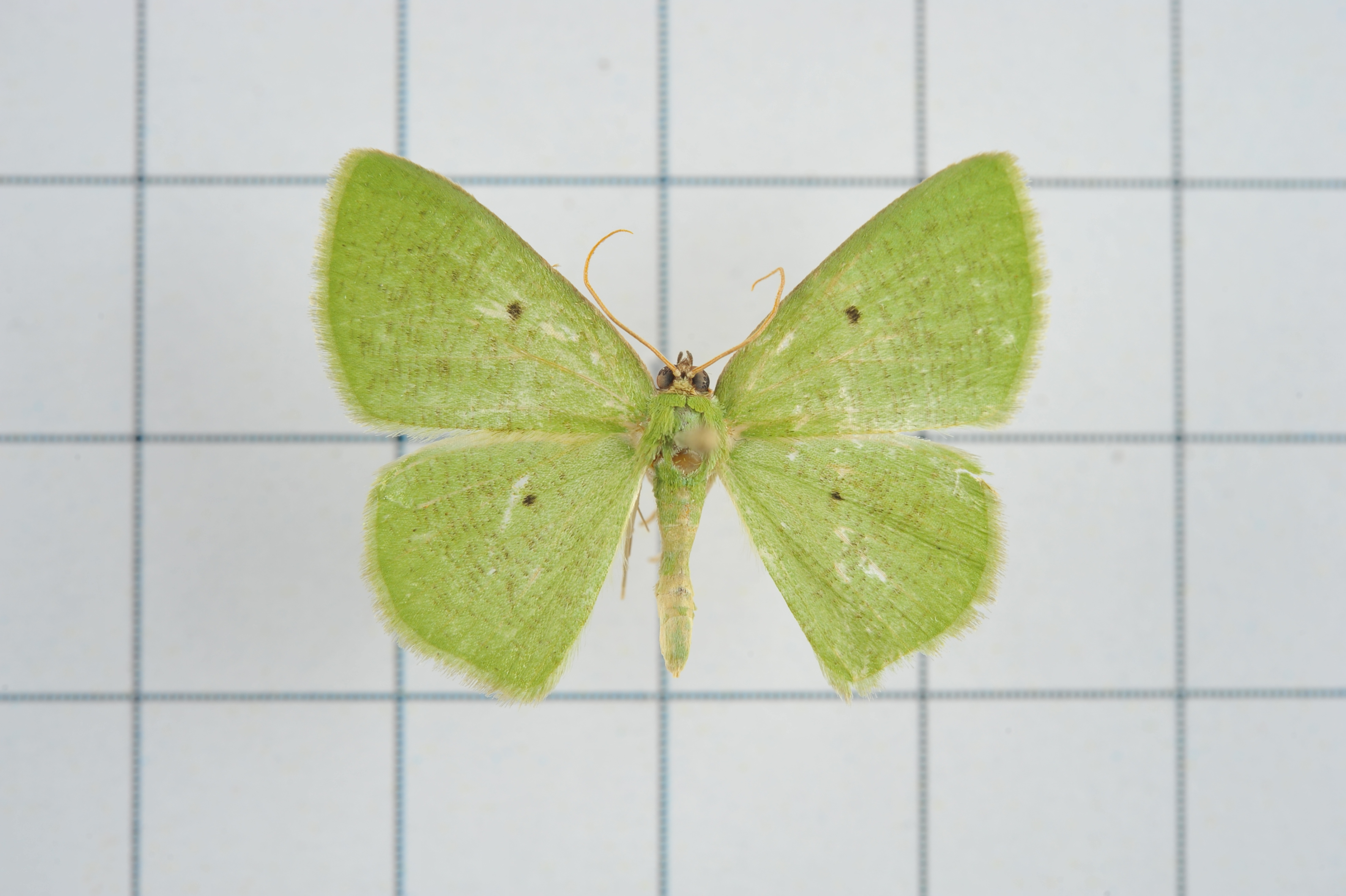

Scientific classification
- Kingdom: Animalia
- Phylum: Arthropoda
- Class: Insecta
- Order: Lepidoptera
- Family: Geometridae
- Genus: Aplochlora
- Species: A. vivilaca

Binomial name
- Aplochlora vivilaca (Walker, 1861)

Synonyms
- Iodis vivilaca Walker, 1861

= Aplochlora vivilaca =

Species of moth

Aplochlora vivilaca is a moth of the family Geometridae first described by Francis Walker in 1861. It is found in Sri Lanka, Indian subregion, Taiwan, Borneo and Sulawesi.

The male has bipectinate (comb-like on both sides) antennae. Its wings are greenish, which can lead to confusion with some members of Geometrinae. There is a black spot found closer to each cell in each wing. On the caterpillar the cylindrical and ground color ranges from greenish to apple green with oily surfaces. Segmental margins are yellow. Thoracic segments are purplish. Host plants of the caterpillar are Casearia and Holoptelea.
