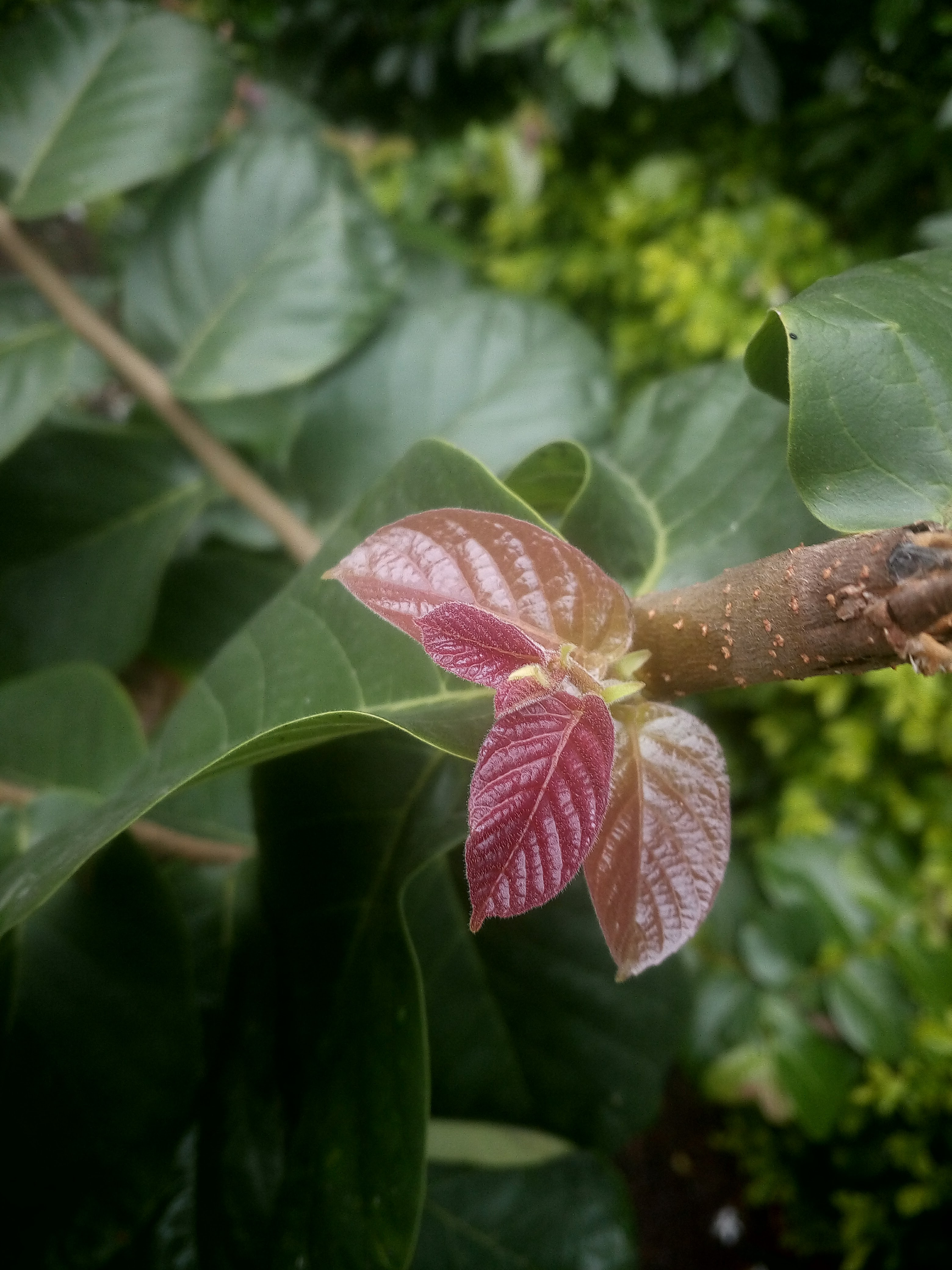
- At Amravati, India

Scientific classification
- Kingdom: Plantae
- Clade: Tracheophytes
- Clade: Angiosperms
- Clade: Eudicots
- Clade: Rosids
- Order: Rosales
- Family: Ulmaceae
- Genus: Holoptelea
- Species: H. integrifolia

Binomial name
- Holoptelea integrifolia (Roxb.) Planch.

Synonyms
- Ulmus integrifolia Roxb.

= Holoptelea integrifolia =

Species of flowering plant

Holoptelea integrifolia, the Indian elm or jungle cork tree, is a species of tree in the family Ulmaceae, and a close relative to the true elms (Ulmus). It is native to most of Indian subcontinent, Indo-China and Myanmar. It is found mostly on plains but also in mountains on elevations up to 1100 m.

== Description ==
The Indian elm is a large deciduous tree, about 20–25 m tall (rarely over 30 m), with a broad crown featuring several ascending branches. Bark is grey in colour, covered with blisters, peeling in corky scales on old trees. Leaves are alternately arranged, elliptic-ovate in shape, 8–13 cm long and 3–6.5 cm wide, smooth, with entire margins (occasionally toothed), and a pointed tip. Leaf base is rounded or heart-shaped. Stipules are lance-shaped. Crushed leaves emit an unpleasant odour. Flowers are small, greenish-yellow to brownish, pubescent, borne in short racemes or fascicles at the scars of fallen leaves. Sepals are velvety, often 4. Fruit is a circular samara, 2.5 cm in diameter, with membranous, net-veined wings, and flat seed.

== Cultivation and uses ==
Holoptelea integrifolia is used for timber which makes cheap furniture and also used as firewood in rural parts. It is also used in ecological forestry for its heat and drought tolerance and regenerative abilities. Its flowers, leaves and bark have medicinal uses against several diseases.

== Propagation ==
Propagation of this tree is easy. The seeds are just flying around. These seeds can be planted in moist soil in a nursery bag or directly at the permanent location using direct seed plantation method. Sticks of bamboo can be used for marking and support. Germination takes place after about 10 days. The tree is quite fast growing. These trees can be planted at 6 × 15 feet. They act as good carbon sink due to fast growth.

== Gallery ==
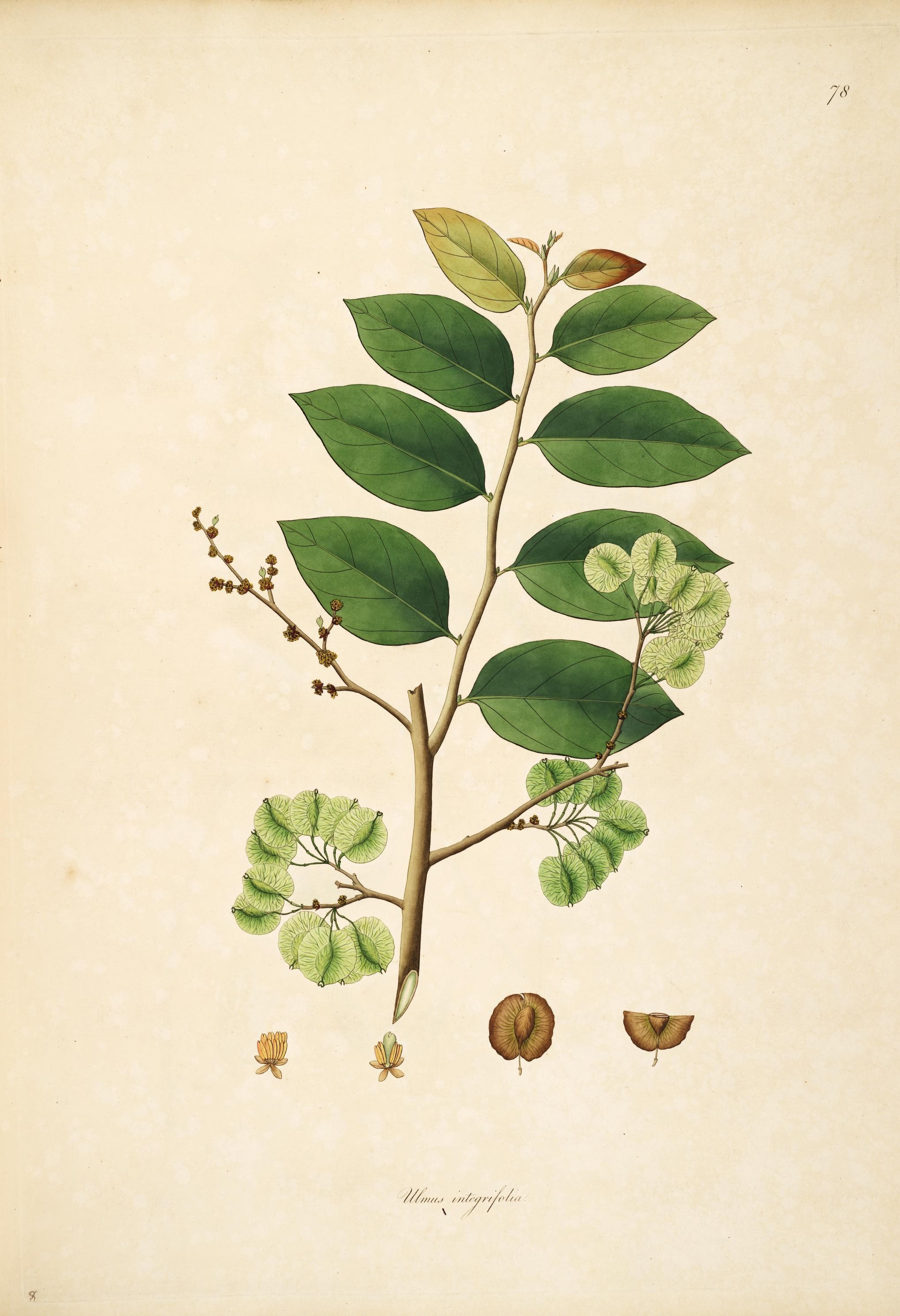
18th century illustration flora of the coast of Coromandel Coast India Plants

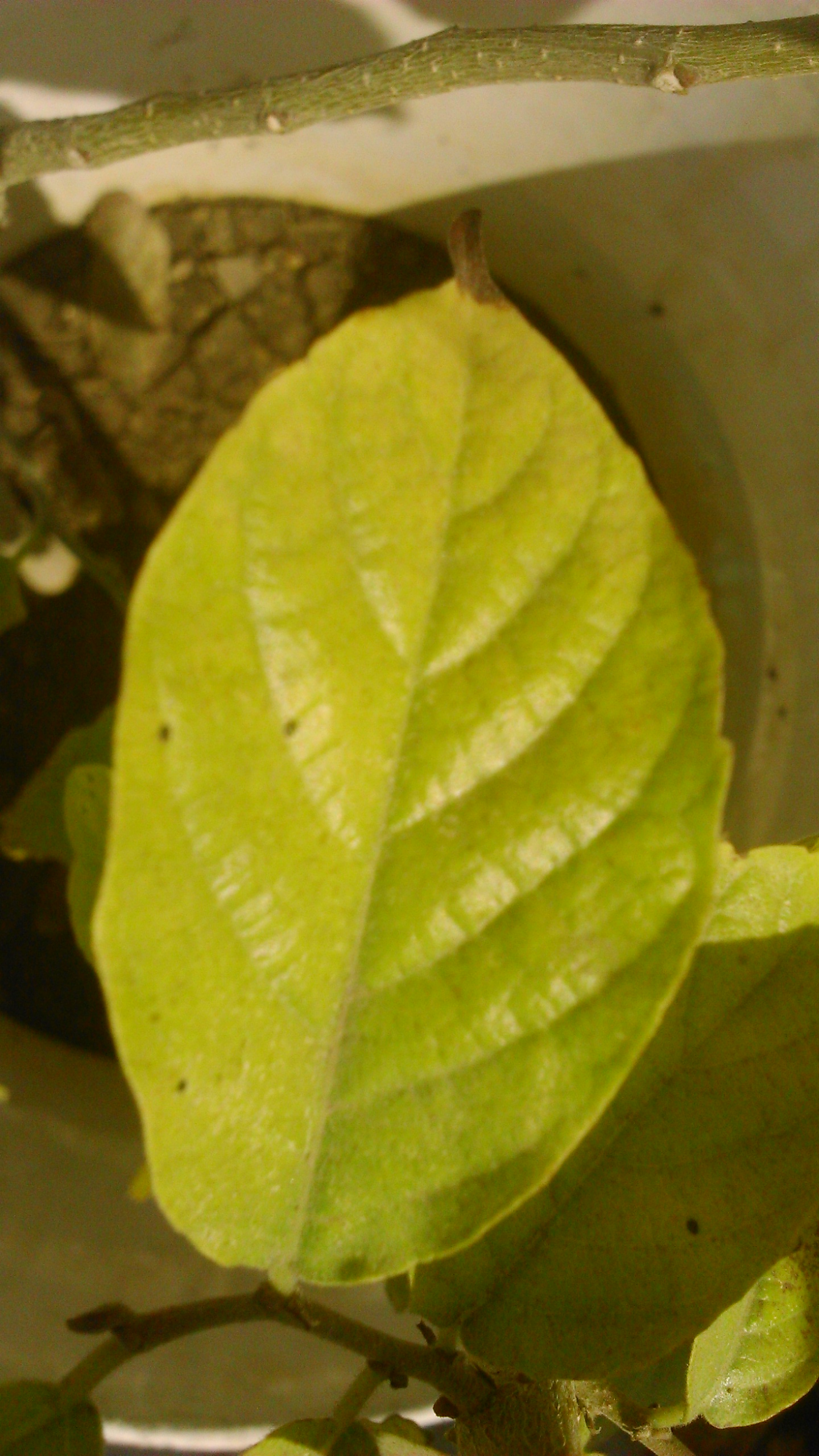
Holoptelea integrifolia leaf in Akola, India

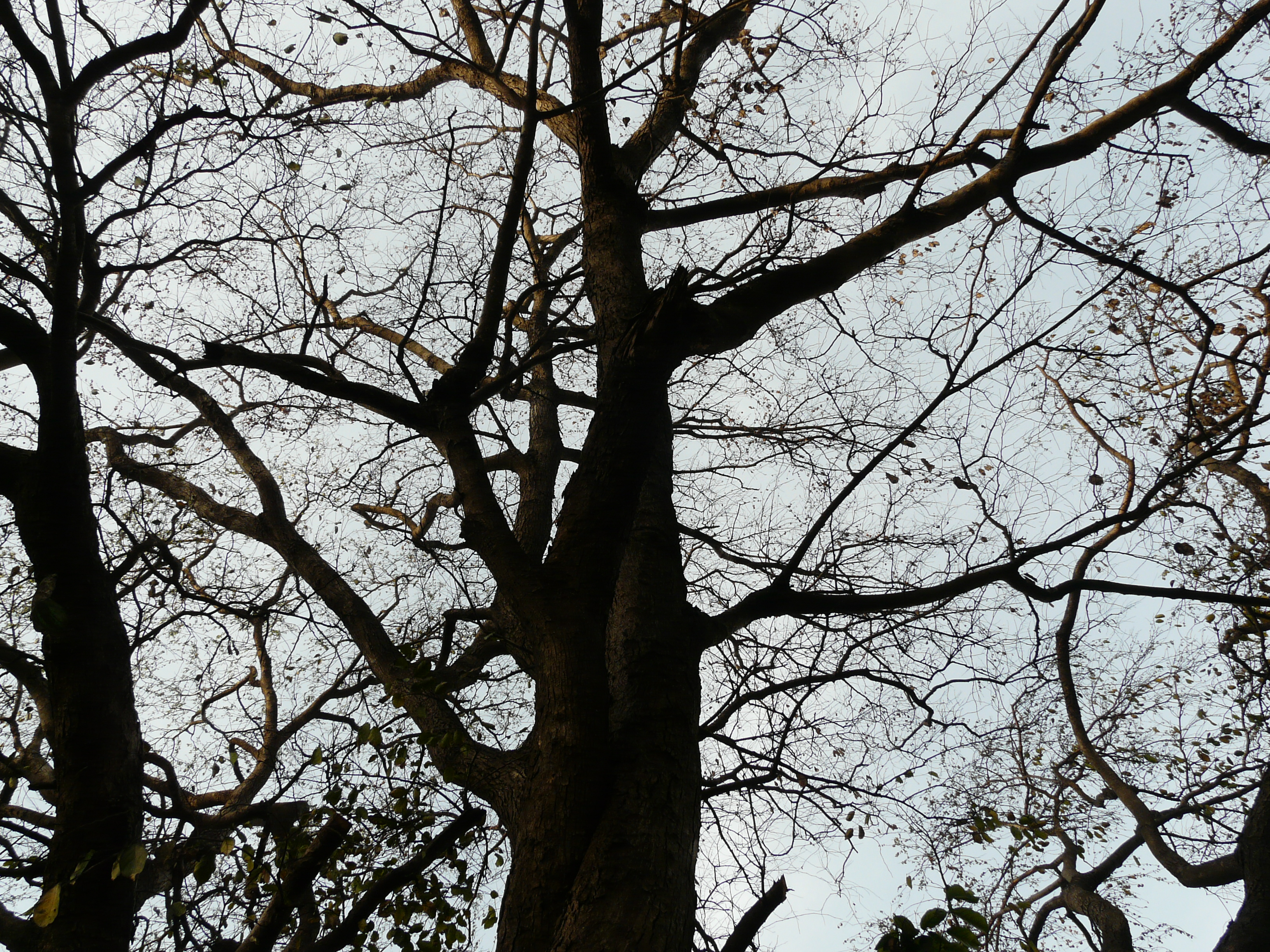
A mature Indian elm tree in fall

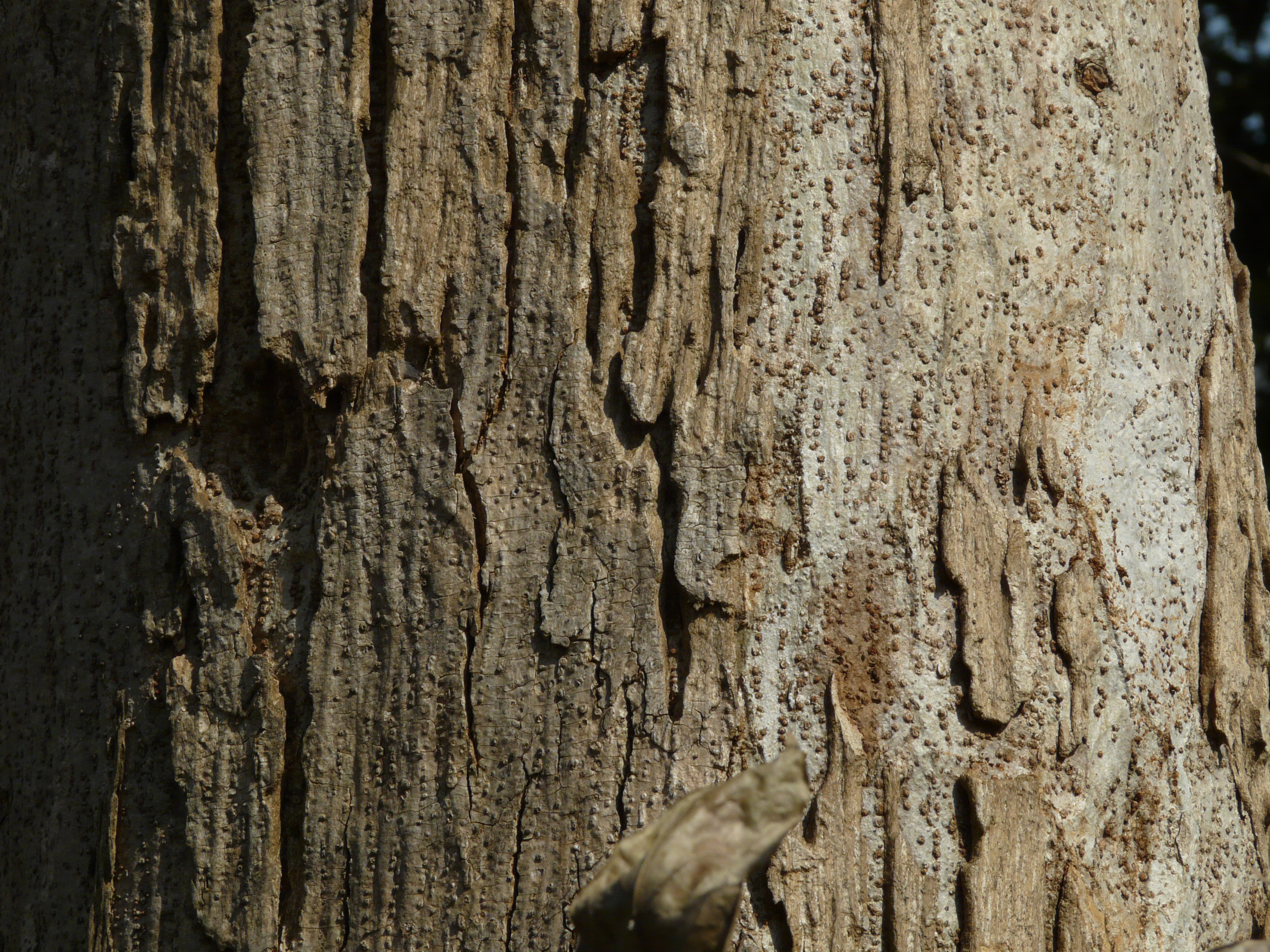
Bark

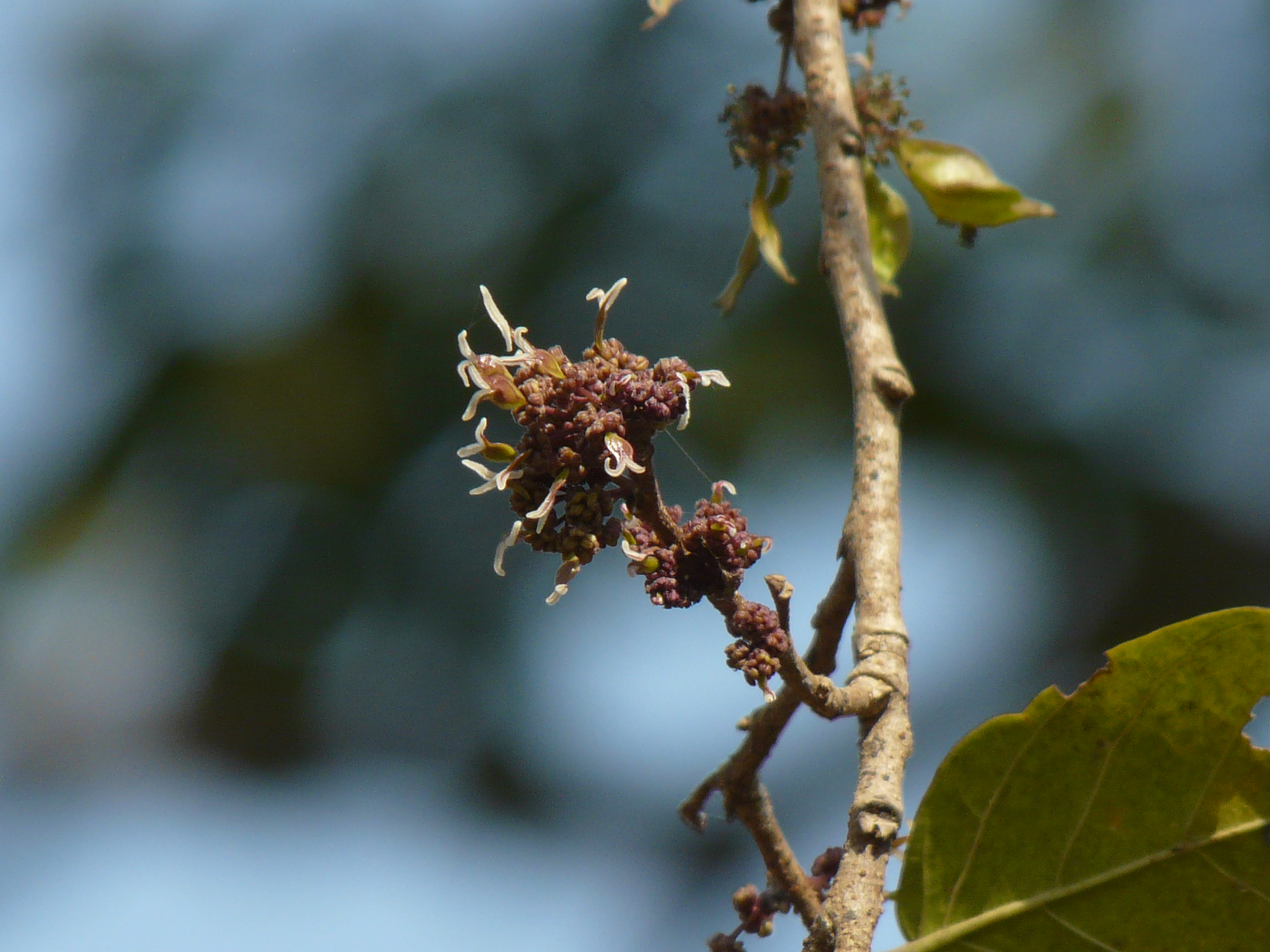
Flower

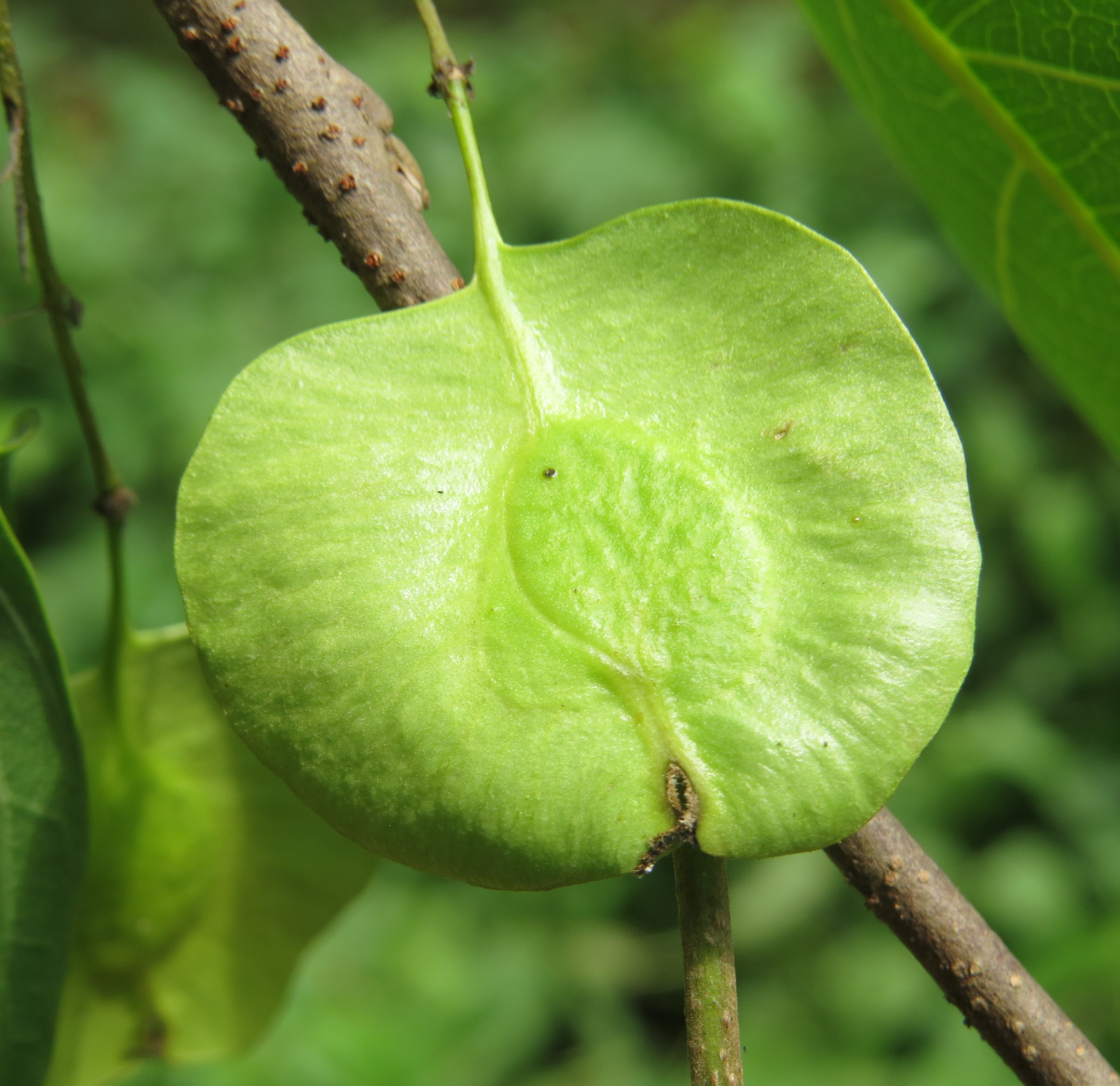
Unripe fruit

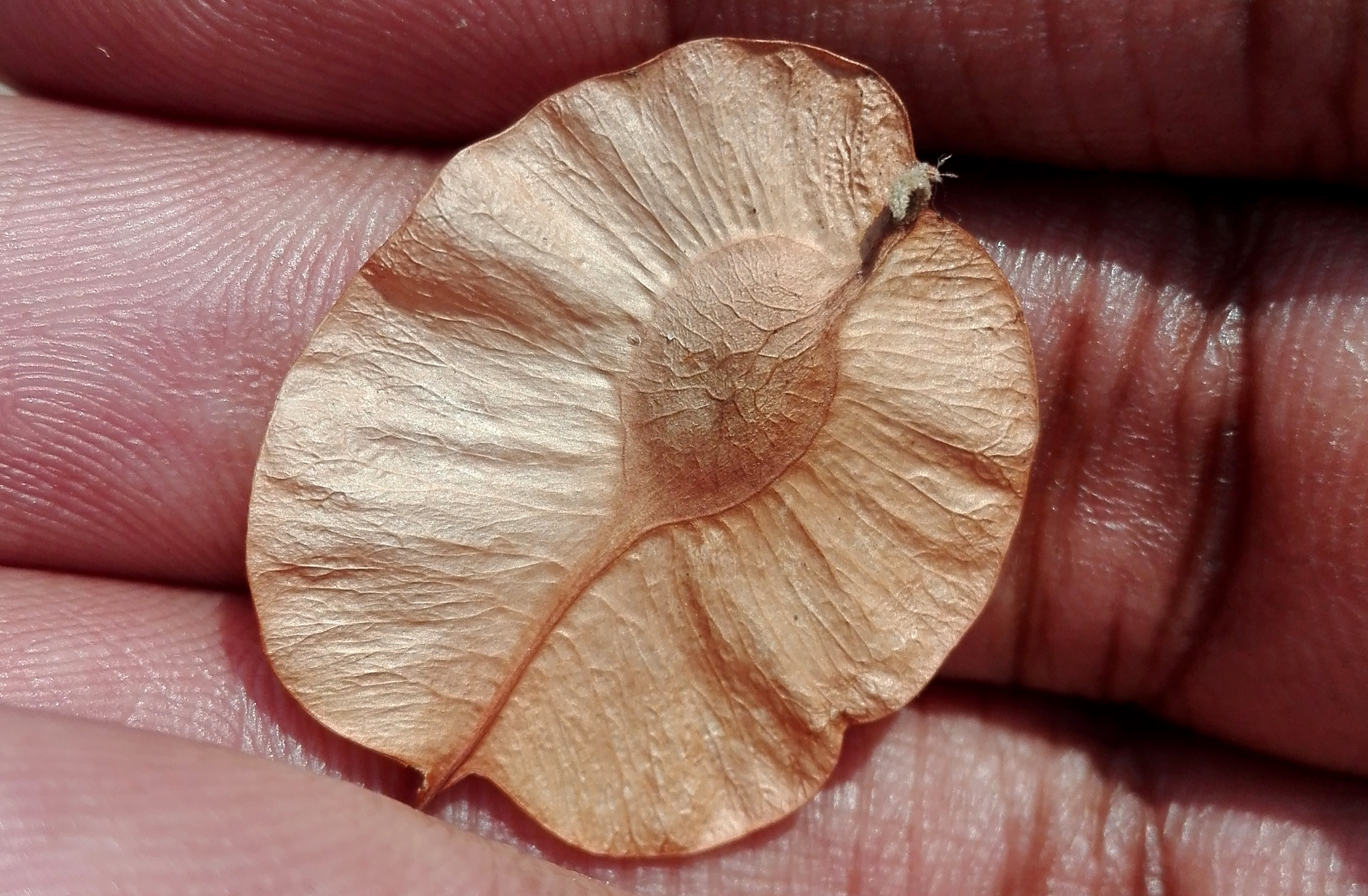
Ripe fruit
