= Aplochlora =

- Aplochlora vivilaca

Scientific classification
- Kingdom: Animalia
- Phylum: Arthropoda
- Clade: Pancrustacea
- Class: Insecta
- Order: Lepidoptera
- Family: Geometridae
- Subfamily: Ennominae
- Genus: Aplochlora; Warren, 1893

Genus of geometer moths

Aplochlora is a genus of moths in the family Geometridae described by Warren in 1893.

== Description ==
Palpi slender, where the second joint reaching vertex of head. Third joint porrect (extending forward). Antennae of male thickened by appressed serrations. Abdomen of male with cylindrical anal tuft. Hind tibia not dilated. Forewings with vein 3 from before angle of cell. Veins 7 to 11 stalked from before upper angle, and veins 10 and 11 stalked, anastomosing (fusing) with vein 12. Vein 10 anastomosing with veins 8 and 9. Hindwings with vein 3 from just before angle of cell. Vein 8 anastomosing with cell at middle.

== Species ==
- Aplochlora eucosmeta Prout, 1916
- Aplochlora pisochroa (Turner, 1906)
- Aplochlora subflava Warren, 1896
- Aplochlora vivilaca (Walker, 1861)
