= Simon Godfried Albert Doorenbos =

Dutch botanist (1891–1980)

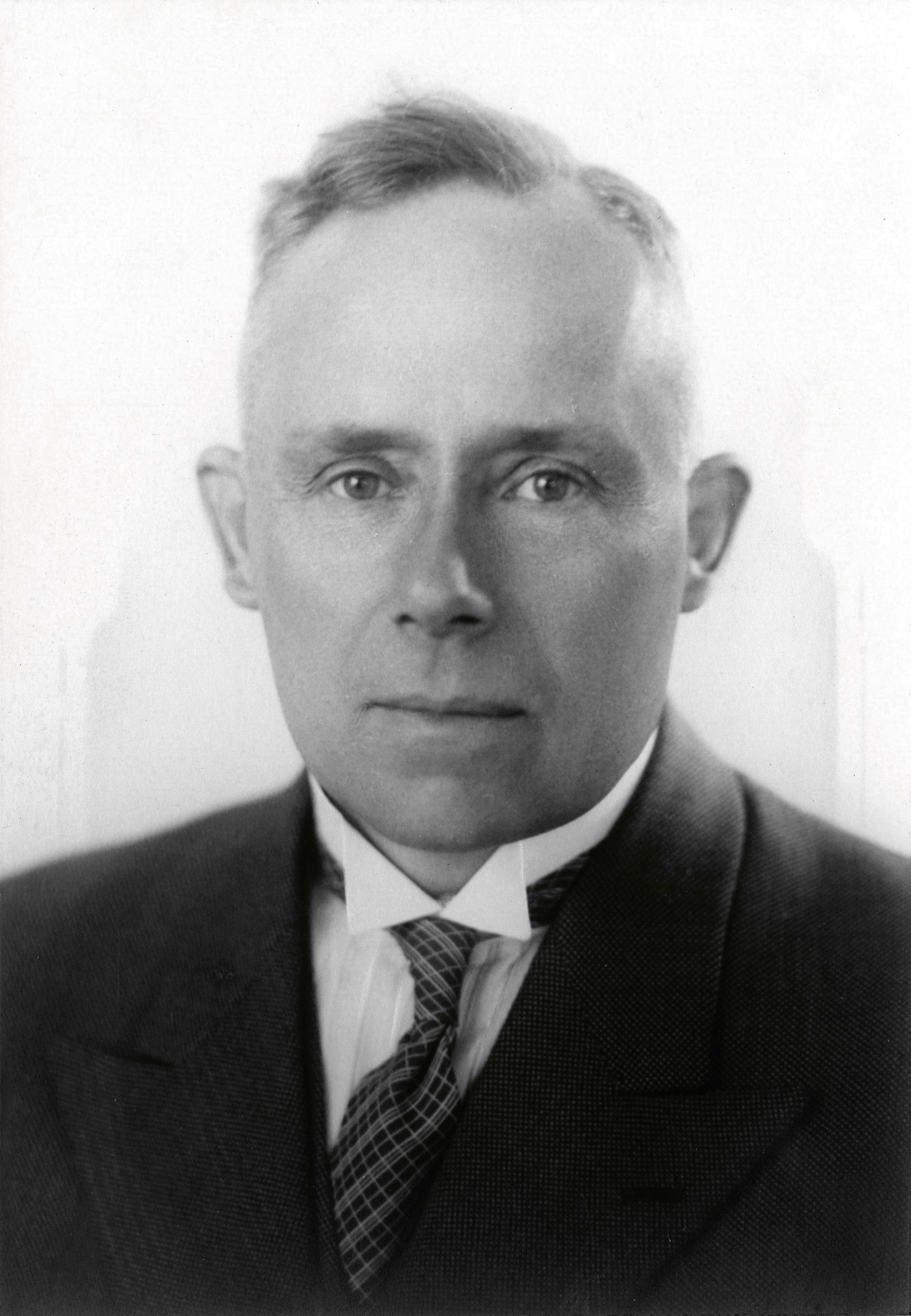
- S.G.A. Doorenbos
- Born: October 7, 1891; Barneveld, Netherlands
- Died: September 15, 1980 (aged 88); Den Haag (The Hague)
- Occupation: horticulturist
- Known for: Director of The Hague Parks Department and co-founder of Nederlandse Dendrologische Vereniging

Simon Godfried Albert Doorenbos (7 October 1891, Barneveld – 1980) was a Dutch horticulturist best known for his work as Director of The Hague Parks Department from 1927 until his retirement in 1957, with a brief interruption during the Second World War when he was dismissed and evicted by the Nazis for refusing to remove trees and shrubs to facilitate the construction of a V1 flying bomb launch pad.

Simon Godfried Albert Doorenbos was born in Barneveld, 7 october 1891, as the son of Fetje Sleeswijk Visser (aged 36) and Jan Doorenbos (aged 42), pastor.

Doorenbos started his career as a nursery representative in 1915, visiting the United Kingdom and United States. His long career was distinguished by the raising of a number of important cultivars, including Symphoricarpos × doorenbosii, Betula utilis 'Doorenbos', and numerous Dahlias. Perhaps his most famous achievement was the hybrid elm cultivar 'Den Haag', indeed it has been postulated that he was the first to think of crossing elms to obtain varieties resistant to Dutch elm disease. Doorenbos was also responsible for the introduction of the Himalayan Elm Ulmus wallichiana to Europe, cuttings of which he obtained from the Arnold Arboretum in 1929; the species was later to play a major role in the Dutch elm breeding programme.

In 1926, Doorenbos founded the 14 hectare Landengebied Arboretum in Zuiderpark, The Hague. The arboretum currently (2014) holds 695 plant species including exotic rarities such as the Japanese Horse Chestnut.

Doorenbos was a founding member of the International Dendrology Society; beyond the world of horticulture, he was also a keen pigeon fancier.

== Eponymy ==
Symphoricarpos × doorenbosii, Betula utilis 'Doorenbos', Iris 'Gerrie Doorenbos', Rosa 'Anneke Doorenbos'.
