= Ulmus wallichiana subsp. wallichiana =

Scientific classification
- Kingdom: Plantae
- Clade: Tracheophytes
- Clade: Angiosperms
- Clade: Eudicots
- Clade: Rosids
- Order: Rosales
- Family: Ulmaceae
- Genus: Ulmus
- Species: U. wallichiana Planch.
- Subspecies: U. w. subsp. wallichiana

Trinomial name
- Ulmus wallichiana subsp. wallichiana

Subspecies of tree

Ulmus wallichiana subsp. wallichiana was identified by Melville and Heybroek after the latter's expedition to the Himalaya in 1960.

== Description ==
A deciduous tree growing to 30 m with a crown comprising several ascending branches. The bark of the trunk is grey-brown, furrowed longitudinally. The leaves range from 6–13 cm long by 2.5–6 cm broad, elliptic-acuminate in shape, and with a glabrous upper surface, on petioles 5–10 mm long. The samarae are orbicular to obovate, 10–13 mm in diameter, on 5 mm pedicels, the seed central.

== Pests and diseases ==
The tree has a high resistance to the fungus Ophiostoma himal-ulmi endemic to the Himalayas and the cause of Dutch elm disease there.

== Cultivation ==
The tree is not known to be in cultivation beyond the Himalaya.
