= Ampelocera =

Scientific classification
- Kingdom: Plantae
- Clade: Tracheophytes
- Clade: Angiosperms
- Clade: Eudicots
- Clade: Rosids
- Order: Rosales
- Family: Ulmaceae
- Genus: Ampelocera; Klotzsch

Species
- See text

Genus of flowering plants

Ampelocera is a genus of low- to mid-elevation rainforest trees of the family Ulmaceae that occur from Mexico to Brazil.

Species include:

- Ampelocera albertiae Todzia
- Ampelocera crenulata Urb.
- Ampelocera cubensis Griseb.
- Ampelocera edentula Kuhlm.
- Ampelocera glabra Kuhlm.
- Ampelocera hondurensis Donn.
- Ampelocera hottlei (Standl.) Standl.
- Ampelocera latifolia Ducke
- Ampelocera longissima Todzia
- Ampelocera macphersonii Todzia
- Ampelocera macrocarpa Forero & A.H. Gentry
- Ampelocera pubescens C.V. Morton
- Ampelocera ruizii Klotzsch
- Ampelocera verrucosa Kuhlm.
