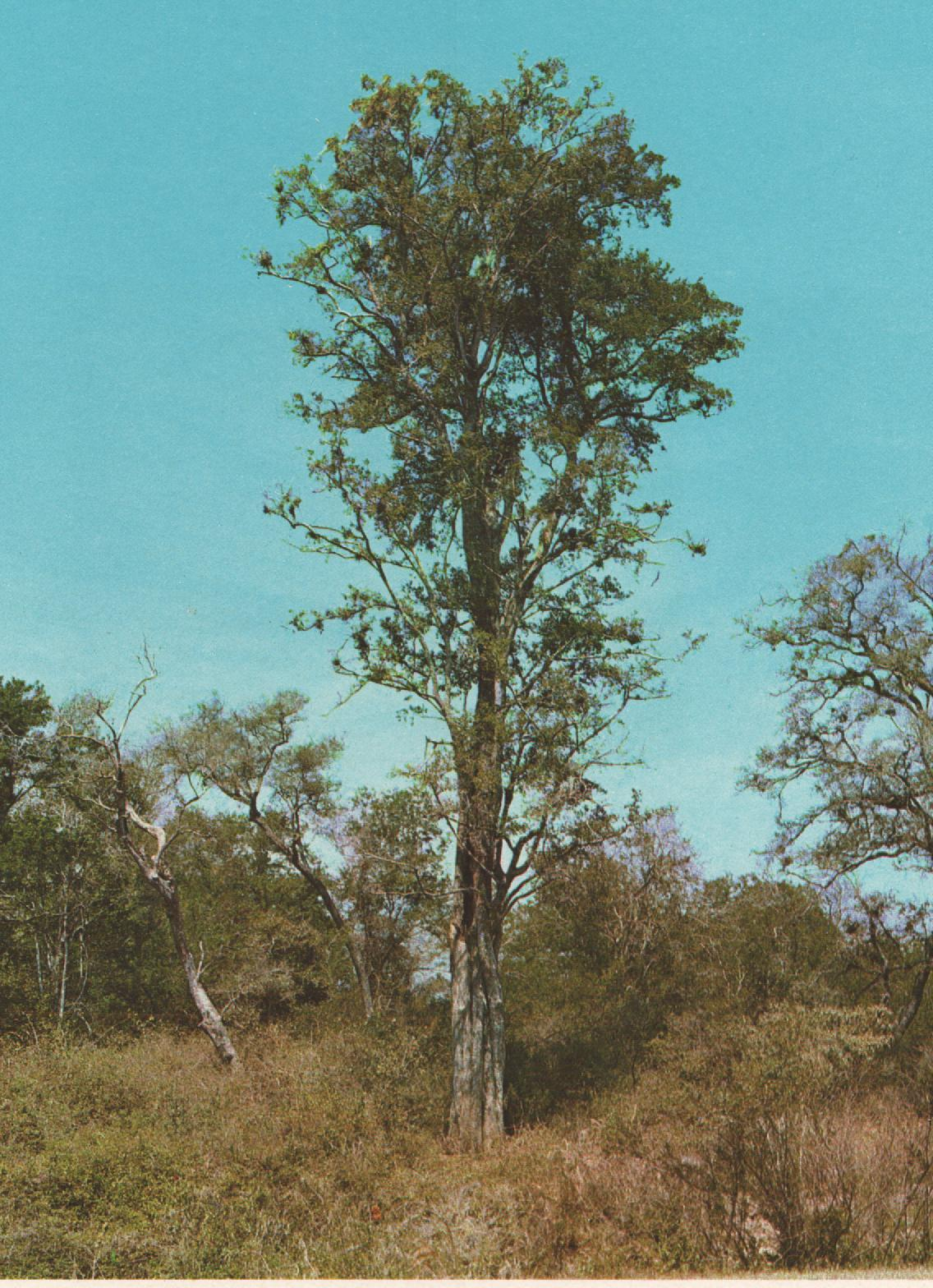
- Phyllostylon rhamnoides

Scientific classification
- Kingdom: Plantae
- Clade: Tracheophytes
- Clade: Angiosperms
- Clade: Eudicots
- Clade: Rosids
- Order: Rosales
- Family: Ulmaceae
- Genus: Phyllostylon; Capan. ex Benth. & Hook.f.

= Phyllostylon =

Genus of flowering plants

Phyllostylon is a genus of plant in family Ulmaceae.

Species include:

- Phyllostylon brasiliense Capan. ex Benth. & Hook.f.
- Phyllostylon orthopterum Hallier f.
- Phyllostylon rhamnoides (J.Poiss.) Taub.
