= Hemiptelea =

Scientific classification
- Kingdom: Plantae
- Clade: Tracheophytes
- Clade: Angiosperms
- Clade: Eudicots
- Clade: Rosids
- Order: Rosales
- Family: Ulmaceae
- Genus: Hemiptelea; Planch.
- Species: H. davidii

Binomial name
- Hemiptelea davidii (Hance) Planch.

Synonyms
- Abelicea davidii (Hance) H.Buek; Planera davidii Hance; Zelkova davidii (Hance) Hemsl.

Genus of flowering plants

Hemiptelea is a genus of flowering plants belonging to the family Ulmaceae. It contains a single species, Hemiptelea davidii, a tree native to China and Korea.
