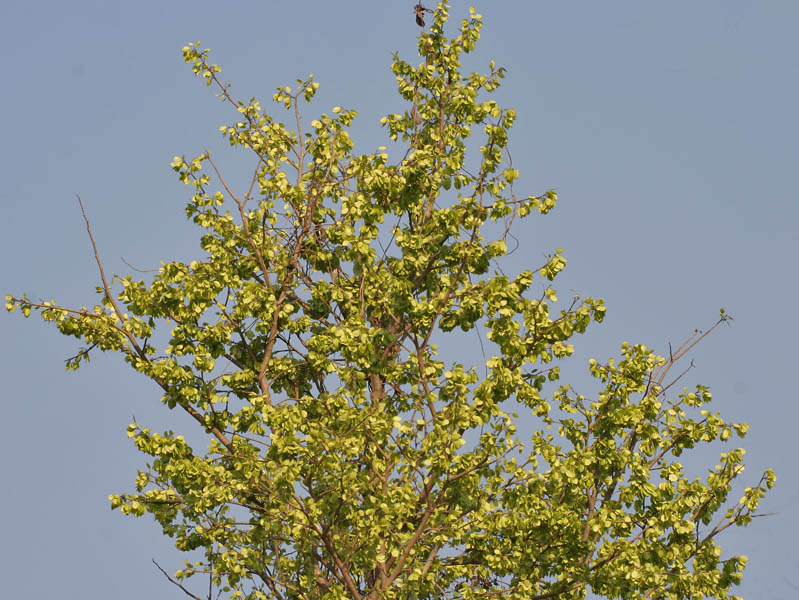
- Holoptelea integrifolia with fruits

Scientific classification
- Kingdom: Plantae
- Clade: Tracheophytes
- Clade: Angiosperms
- Clade: Eudicots
- Clade: Rosids
- Order: Rosales
- Family: Ulmaceae
- Genus: Holoptelea; Planch.

Species
- See text

= Holoptelea =

Genus of flowering plants

Holoptelea is a genus of deciduous trees in the family Ulmaceae.

== Species ==
As of 2020, Plants of the World Online recognises two species:

- Holoptelea grandis (Hutch.) Mildbr. – Africa
- Holoptelea integrifolia (Roxb.) Planch. – Asia
