= Ophiostoma himal-ulmi =

Scientific classification
- Domain: Eukaryota
- Kingdom: Fungi
- Division: Ascomycota
- Class: Sordariomycetes
- Order: Ophiostomatales
- Family: Ophiostomataceae
- Genus: Ophiostoma
- Species: O. himal-ulmi

Binomial name
- Ophiostoma himal-ulmi Brasier & Mehrotra (1995)

Species of fungus

Ophiostoma himal-ulmi is a species of fungus in the family Ophiostomataceae. It is one of the causative agents of Dutch elm disease. It was first isolated around breeding galleries of scolytid beetles in the bark of Ulmus wallichiana (the Himalayan elm). This, together with the fact that it is endemic to the Himalayas, is the reason it is named himal-ulmi (‘of the Himalayan elm’; ulmi means ‘of the elm’).

It is outcrossing and heterothallic, with two sexual compatibility types: A and B, occurring in a near 1:1 ratio in nature. It also exhibits a distinctive colony type, an ability to produce synnemata on malt extract agar, production of perithecia with long necks, a very high level of cerato-ulmin toxin production in liquid shake cultures, and moderate to strong vascular wilt pathogenicity on Ulmus procera.
