= Hans M. Heybroek =

Dutch botanist

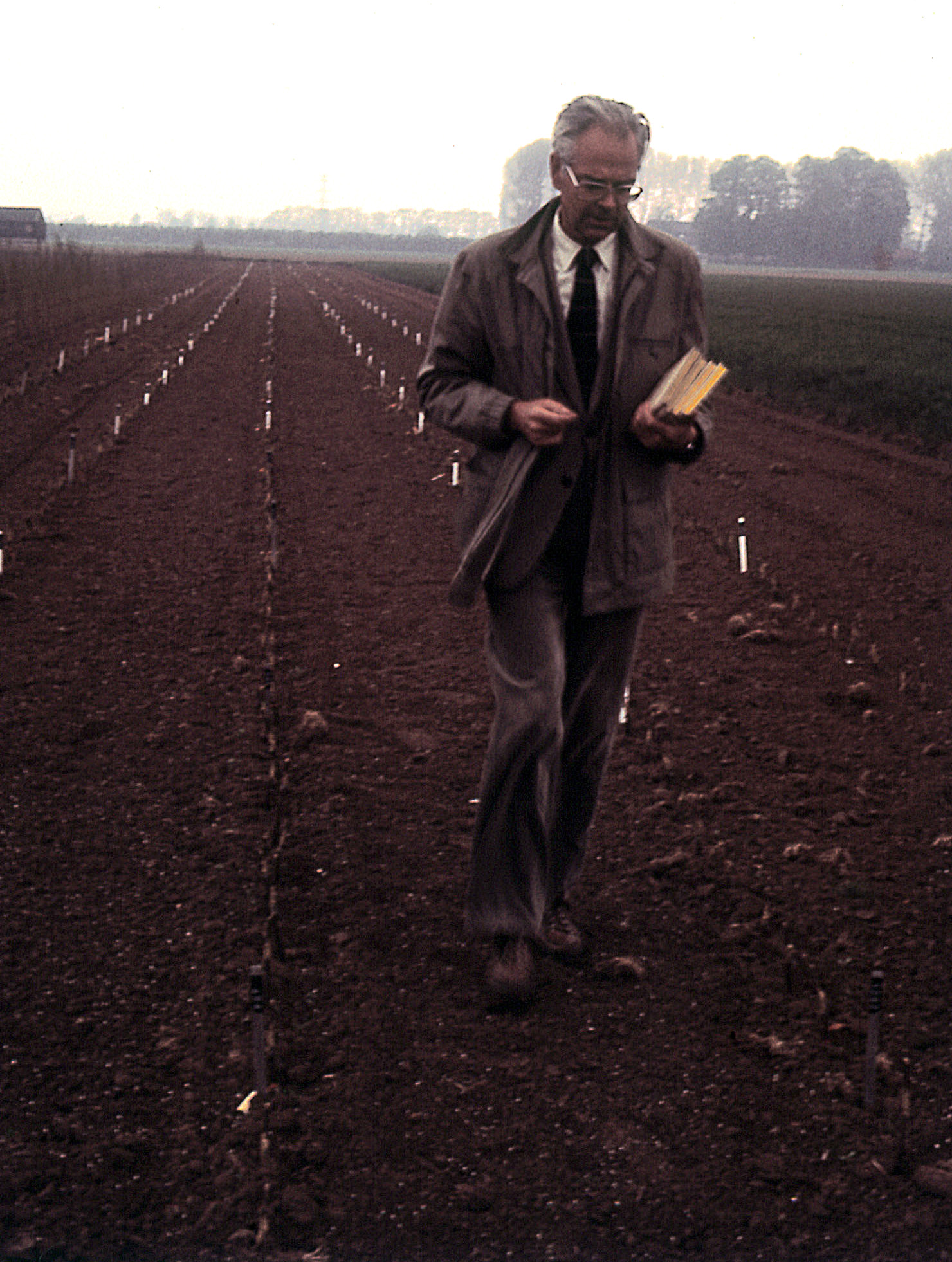
H.M.Heybroek in experimental field - elm trial Wageningen - DORSCHKAMP (May 15, 1984)

Hans M. Heybroek (30 May 1927, Bussum, - 13 June 2022, Wassenaar) was a Dutch botanist best known for his research into the genus Ulmus at the Dorschkamp Research Institute for Forestry & Landscape Planning. Until his retirement in 1992, he was responsible for the raising and release of numerous elm hybrid cultivars, notably 'Columella'. Specializing in phytopathology, Heybroek also investigated the Coral Spot fungus Nectria cinnabarina in elm. In 1960 he travelled to the Kashmir to search for a frost-hardy form of the Himalayan Elm Ulmus wallichiana as a source of anti-fungal genes for use in the Dutch elm research programme.

Heybroek also collected cultural material from around Europe related to the elm.

== Publications ==
- Aims and criteria in elm breeding in the Netherlands. In H. Gerhold et al., eds. (1966). Breeding pest-resistant trees. Pages 387–389. Pergammon Press, Oxford.
- Iep of olm, karakterboom van de Lage Landen (:Elm, a tree with character of the Low Countries), (with Goudzwaard, L, Kaljee, H.) (2009). KNNV, Uitgeverij. ISBN 978-90-5011-281-9.
- The Dutch elm breeding program. Dutch Elm Disease Research, Chapter 3, in Sticklen & Sherald, Eds. (1993). Springer Verlag, New York, USA.
- Elms of the Himalaya (co-author R. Melville). Kew Bulletin Vol. 26(1), 1971, London.
- Resistant Elms for Europe. In Burdekin, D. A. (Ed.) Research on Dutch elm disease in Europe. For. Comm. Bull. 60. pp 108 – 113. 1983.
