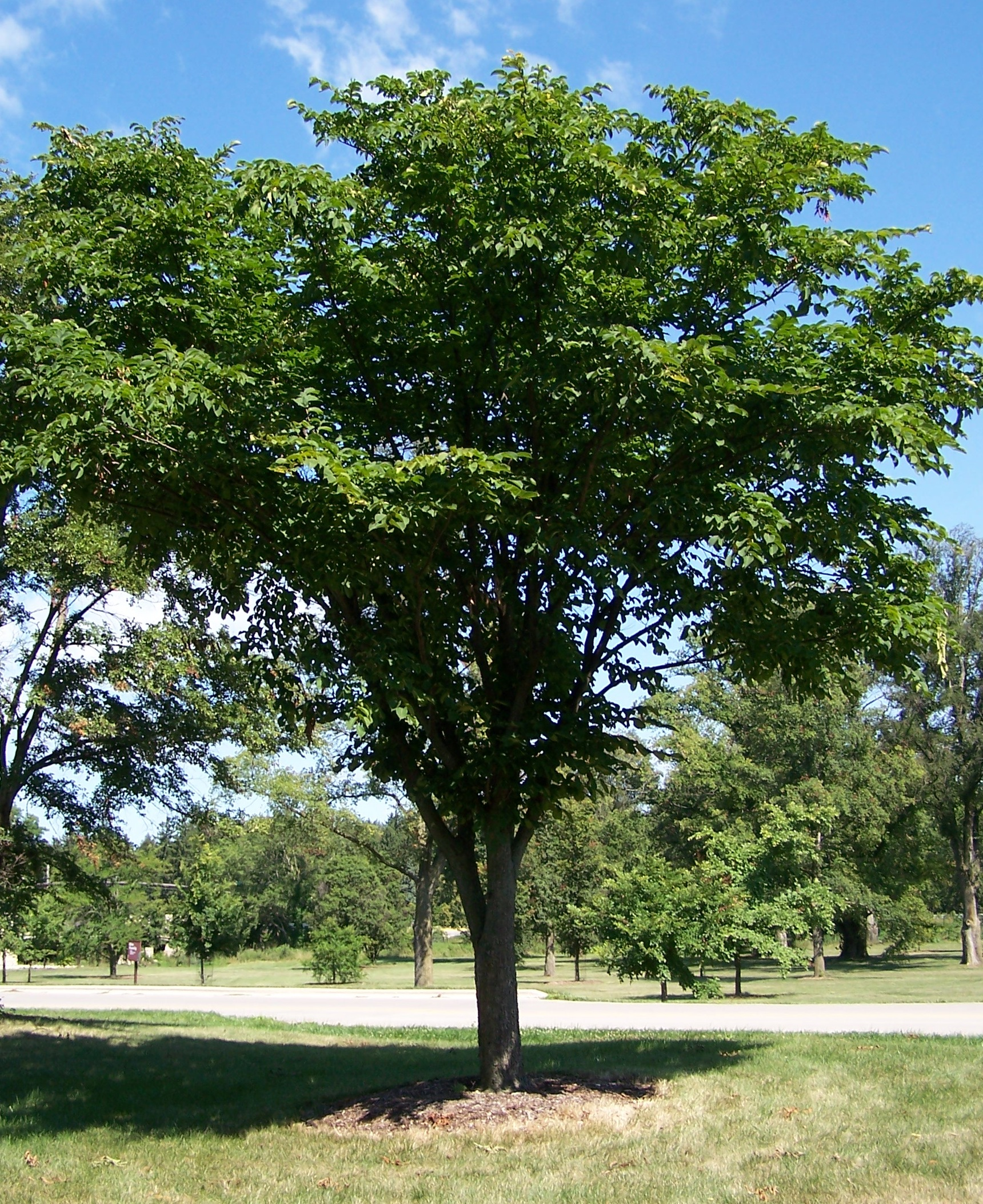
- Ulmus laciniata Morton Arboretum acc. 180-84-1

Scientific classification
- Kingdom: Plantae
- Clade: Tracheophytes
- Clade: Angiosperms
- Clade: Eudicots
- Clade: Rosids
- Order: Rosales
- Family: Ulmaceae; Mirb. 1815

Type species
- Ulmus L. 1753

Genera
- Ampelocera Klotzsch 1847 (12 spp.); Hemiptelea Planch. 1872 (1 sp.); Holoptelea Planch. 1848 (1 sp.); Phyllostylon Benth. 1880 (2 spp.); Planera J.F.Gmel. 1791 (1 sp.); Ulmus L. 1753 (40 spp.); Zelkova Spach 1841 (6 spp.)
- The range of Ulmaceae.

Synonyms
- Samaracaceae Dulac

= Ulmaceae =

Ulmaceae Temporal range: Late Cretaceous – Present

Family of flowering plants

The Ulmaceae (/ʌlˈmeɪsi/) are a family of flowering plants that includes the elms (genus Ulmus), and the zelkovas (genus Zelkova). Members of the family are widely distributed throughout the north temperate zone, and have a scattered distribution elsewhere except for Australasia.

The family was formerly sometimes treated to include the hackberries, (Celtis and allies), but an analysis by the Angiosperm Phylogeny Group suggests that these genera are better placed in the related family Cannabaceae. It generally is considered to include ca 7 genera and about 45 species. Some classifications also include the genus Ampelocera.

== Description ==
The family is a group of evergreen or deciduous trees and shrubs with mucilaginous substances in leaf and bark tissue. Leaves are usually alternate on the stems. The leaf blades are simple (not compound), with entire (smooth) or variously toothed margins, and often have an asymmetrical base. The flowers are small and either bisexual or unisexual. The fruit is an indehiscent samara, nut, or drupe.

== Uses ==
Ulmus provides important timber trees mostly for furniture.

== Phylogeny ==
Modern molecular phylogenetics suggest the following relationships:

- - Cannabaceae (outgroup)
  - Ulmaceae
    - - Holoptelea
      - Ampelocera
    - - Hemiptelea
      - - Zelkova
        - Ulmus
