= Hillier =

Hillier, Hilliers, or variation, may refer to:

== People with the surname ==
- Alfred Hillier (1858–1911), English politician
- Barry Hillier (1936–2016), English footballer
- Ben Hillier, British songwriter and producer
- Bevis Hillier (born 1940), English art historian, author and journalist
- Brian Hillier (1943–2008), British football chairman
- David Hillier (born 1969), English footballer
- Cliff Hillier (born 1932), Australian rules footballer
- Craig Hillier (born 1978), Canadian former professional ice hockey goaltender
- Daniel Hillier (born 1998), New Zealand professional golfer
- David Hillier (born 1969), English footballer
- Edwin Hillier (1838–1926), British horticulturist, founder of Hillier Nurseries
- Ernest Hillier, founder of Australian chocolatier Ernest Hillier Chocolates
- Erwin Hillier (1911–2005), German-born cinematographer
- George Hillier (1815–1866), English antiquarian
- George Lacy Hillier (1856–1941), English racing cyclist and pioneer of British cycling
- Sir Harold Hillier, English horticulturist
- Ian Hillier (born 1979), Welsh footballer
- Jack Hillier (art historian) (1912–1995), British scholar of Japanese art
- Jack Hillier (footballer) (1933–2006), English footballer
- James Hillier (1915–2007), Canadian-born American inventor
- James Hillier (actor) (born 1973), British actor and director
- Jean Hillier, British-Australian professor at RMIT University, Melbourne, Australia
- Joe Hillier (1907–1979), English footballer
- John Hillier (born 1944), English athlete
- Joseph Hillier (born 1974), British sculptor
- Judith Hillier, British physicist
- Katie Hillier (born 1974), British fashion designer
- Ladeana Hillier, American biologist
- Louis Hillier (disambiguation)
  - Louis Hillier (botanist) (1871–1962), a French bryologist and botanist
  - Louis Hillier (musician) (1868–1960), a Belgian musician and composer of Wallonia
- Meg Hillier (born 1969), British politician
- Paul Hillier (born 1949), British conductor, director and baritone singer
- Pete Hillier (born 1977), English dancer, director and presenter
- Randy Hillier (politician) (born 1958), Canadian politician
- Randy Hillier (ice hockey) (born 1960), Canadian ice hockey player
- Rick Hillier (born 1955), Canadian Forces general, chief of the Defence Staff 2005–2008
- Ryan Hillier (born 2003), Welsh footballer
- Sean Hillier (born 1986), English football player
- Sharon Hillier (born 1954), American microbiologist
- Stan Hillier (born 1904), English football player and manager
- Sir Stephen Hillier (born 1962), Royal Air Force Air Chief Marshal
- Steve Hillier, British keyboardist, songwriter and record producer
- Tristram Hillier (1905–1983), English surrealist painter
- Sir Walter Hillier (1849–1927), British diplomat, academic, author and Sinologist
- Whitney Hillier (born 1990), Australian golfer
- Baraguey d'Hilliers (disambiguation)
  - Louis Baraguey d'Hilliers (1764–1813), French general
  - Achille Baraguey d'Hilliers (1795–1878), Marshal of France

== Places ==
- Hillier, Ontario, Canada; a hamlet in Prince Edward County
- Hillier, South Australia, Australia; a northern suburb of Adelaide
- Lake Hillier, Western Australia, Australia
- Hillier Street, Sheung Wan, Victoria, Hong Kong Island, Hong Kong, China
- Sir Harold Hillier Gardens, nursery gardens and arboretum near Romsey, Hampshire, England
- Saint-Hilliers, commune in Seine-et-Marne, Île-de-France, France

== Other uses ==
- Ernest Hillier Chocolates, Australian chocolatier
- Hillier Nurseries, British shrub and tree nursery
- Hillier Cup, Northhampshire soccer county cup

== See also ==
- Hillyer (disambiguation)
- Hilly (disambiguation)
- Hiller (disambiguation)
- Hill (disambiguation)
