= Hillyer =

Hillyer may refer to:

== People ==
- Ethel Hillyer Harris (1859-1931), American author
- Barbara Hillyer (born 1934), American women's studies academic
- Charles Hillyer (1845–1872), English cricketer
- Charles Hillyer Brand (1861–1933), American politician, businessman, jurist and lawyer
- Charles T. Hillyer, 19th century politician and soldier from Connecticut
- Conway Hillyer Arnold (1848–1917), rear admiral of the United States Navy
- Edgar Winters Hillyer (1830–1882), United States federal judge
- Enrico Hillyer Giglioli (1845–1909), Italian zoologist and anthropologist
- George Hillyer (1835–1927), American politician
- Jim Hillyer (coach) (1928–1991), American college football coach
- Jim Hillyer (politician) (1974–2016), Canadian politician
- Junius Hillyer (1807–1886), American politician and lawyer
- Lambert Hillyer (1889–1969), American film director and screenwriter
- Lewis Wellington Hillyer (1818–1897), American politician from Iowa
- Lonnie Hillyer (1940–1985), American jazz trumpeter
- Quin Hillyer (born 1964), American newspaper columnist and writer
- Raphael Hillyer (1914–2010), American viola soloist, teacher
- Robert Hillyer (1895–1961), American poet
- William Hillyer (1813–1861), English cricketer

== Other uses ==
- Hillyer College, University of Hartford, West Hartford, Connecticut, USA

== See also ==
- Senator Hillyer (disambiguation)
- Hillier (disambiguation), including d'Hillier
- Hill (disambiguation)
- Hiller (disambiguation)
- Hilly (disambiguation)
