= Hillfield =

Hillfield, Hill Field, or, variation, may refer to:

== Places ==
- Hillfield, Devon, England, a location
- Hillfield, Solihull, West Midlands, England, a location
- Hillfields, Coventry, West Midlands, England, UK
- Hillfields, Bristol, England, UK
- Hillfield Gardens, Gloucester, England, UK
- Hillfield Park, Solihull, West Midlands, England, UK
- Hill Field Road (SR 232) Utah, USA

== Facilities and structures ==
- Hillfield Court, Belsize Park, Camden, London, England, UK; a residential complex
- Hillfield House, Gloucester, England, UK; a listed building
- Hill Field (IATA airport code: HIF, ICAO airport code: KHIF), Ogden, Utah, USA; a U.S. Airforce Base
- Talmadge L. Hill Field House, Baltimore, Maryland, USA; a multipurpose arena

== Other uses ==
- Hill-Fields Entertainment, a U.S. production company

== See also ==
- Hilly Flanks, Fertile Crescent
- Hillyfields (disambiguation)
- Hilly (disambiguation)
- Hill (disambiguation)
- Field (disambiguation)
- Fields (disambiguation)
