= Baraguey d'Hilliers =

Baraguey d'Hilliers may refer to:

== People with the surname ==
- Count Baraguey d'Hilliers (French: Comte Baraguey d'Hilliers), a title held by Achille and Louis:
  - Achille Baraguey d'Hilliers (1795–1878), politician, Marshal of France, and son of Louis Baraguey d'Hilliers
  - Louis Baraguey d'Hilliers (1764–1813), French general during the Napoleonic Wars and father of Achille Baraguey d'Hilliers

== Other uses ==
- Hougoumont (ship), a tall ship renamed Baraguey d'Hilliers during her service in the Crimean War

== See also ==
- Hillyer (disambiguation)
- Hillier (disambiguation)
