= Louis Hillier =

Louis Hillier may refer to:

- Louis Hillier (botanist) (1871–1962), a French bryologist and botanist
- Louis Hillier (musician) (1868–1960), a Belgian musician and composer of Wallonia
