= Ulmus 'Hillieri' =

Elm cultivar

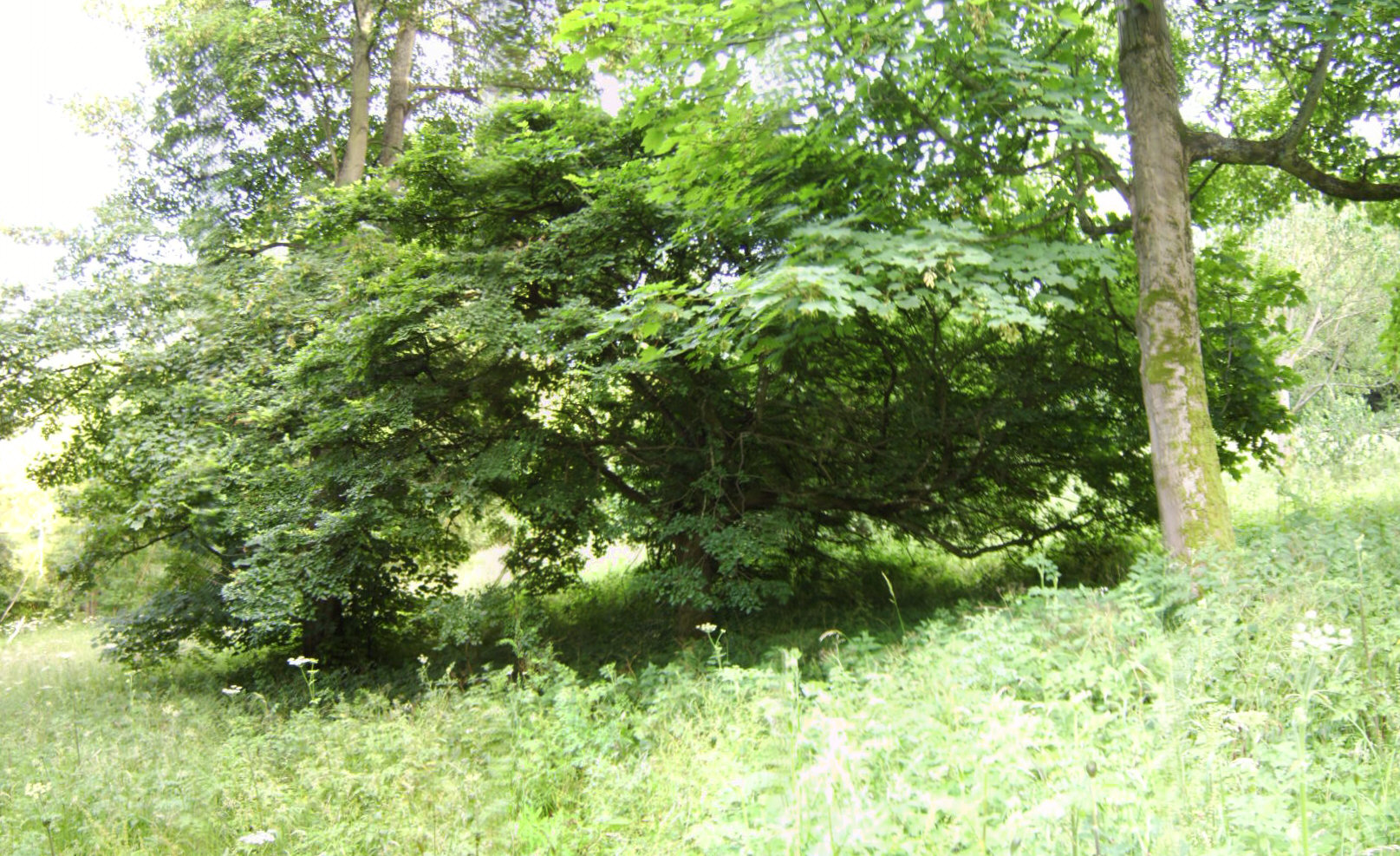
- 'Hillieri' in Stanmer Park Arboretum, Brighton, summer, c.2005
- Genus: Ulmus
- Cultivar: 'Hillieri'
- Origin: Winchester, England

The elm cultivar Ulmus 'Hillieri' arose from a chance seedling at Hillier's Pitt Corner nursery near Winchester, England, in 1918, and was marketed from 1928 as Ulmus hillieri, a name accepted by Christine Buisman in her 1931 labelling of a specimen in France. Since at least 1944 the tree has been determined a form of Ulmus × hollandica, its designation at Kew Gardens, in Green, and in later Hillier catalogues. In 1940, 'Hillieri' was noted as being a hybrid of uncertain origin. Krüssmann notes that for a time the tree was listed by Hilliers as U. × hillieri.

Not to be confused with Ulmus 'Jacqueline Hillier', which also has a shrubby habit but much smaller leaves.

== Description ==
'Hillieri' is a graceful, compact, slow-growing miniature tree rarely > 1.2 m in height, (Note: The 2002 edition of The Hillier Manual of Trees and Shrubs misprints as "usually less than 12 m high" (p.369).) widely branched and bearing weeping branches. The small leaves (5 – 7 cm by 2.5 – 3 cm) turn crimson and yellow in favourable autumns, a feature of at least one Japanese Elm cultivar, 'Jacan'. The 'vivid scarlet' of the autumn leaves was noted (1940) as being a unique colouring for elms.

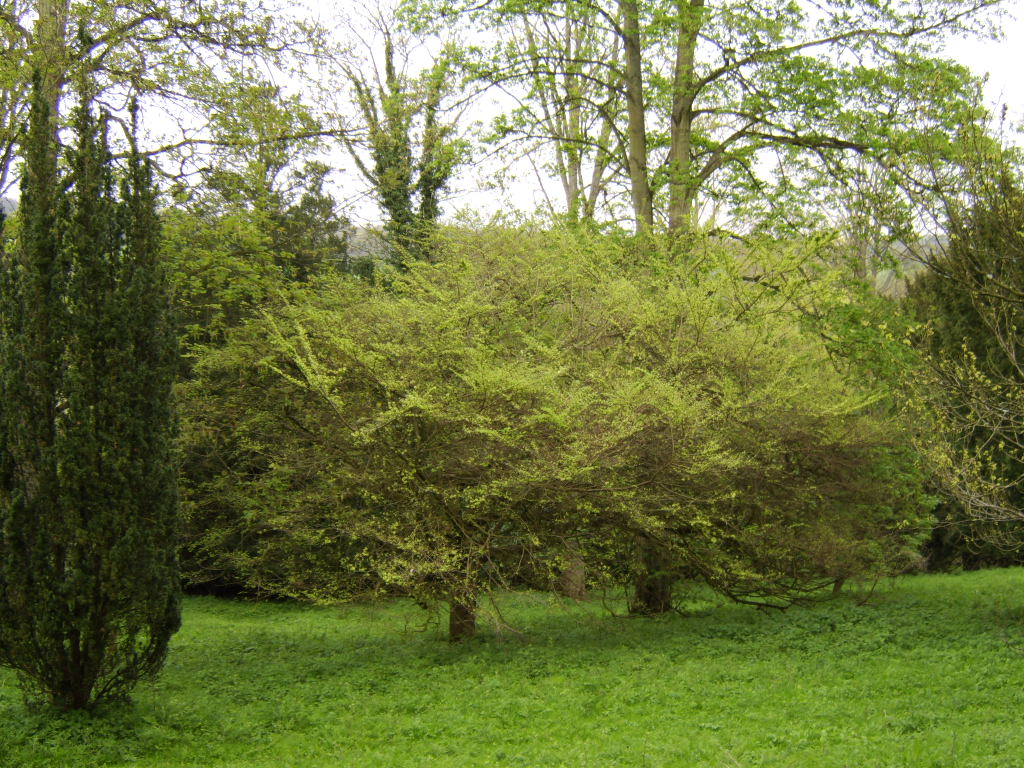
'Hillieri' in Stanmer Park Arboretum, spring

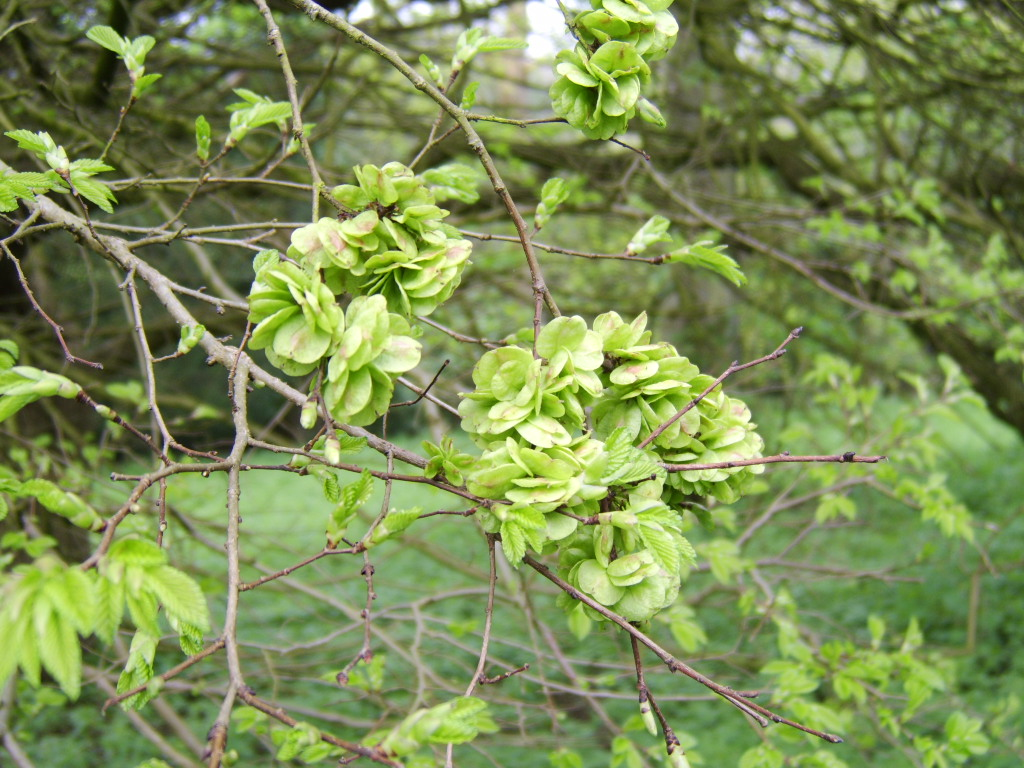
Fruit of same

== Pests and diseases ==
The degree of the tree's susceptibility to Dutch elm disease (DED) is unknown. It has been noted that shrub-elms are usually less prone to infection.

== Cultivation ==
A specimen stood in the Arboretum national des Barres, Nogent-sur-Vernisson, France, in the 1930s; the tree was present in The Hague in the same decade. It was introduced to the US in 1954 as Ulmus hillieri. An old low shrub-elm in Stanmer Park Arboretum, Brighton (2018, now storm-damaged), planted in the winter of 1965-6, with level rather than pendulous branching and leaves closely matching 'Hillieri' herbarium specimens in Kew Herbarium and the Arboretum national des Barres, was said (2018) by Hillier Nurseries, who supplied many elms to the arboretum, to be 'Hillieri', though it is about 4 m tall and lacks crimson autumn colour. Dutch authorities who examined the tree in 2010 conjectured Japanese Elm hybrid.

A tree cultivated in Denmark as Ulmus × hollandica 'Hillieri' or Dukke-elm (:Doll's elm) appears from photographs to be U. 'Jacqueline Hillier'. A tree in the Arboretum Volčji Potok, Slovenia, labelled Ulmus × hollandica 'Hillieri', has leaves much smaller than those of 'Hillieri', and may be a form of dwarf Ulmus parvifolia.

== Synonymy ==
- Ulmus hillieri Hort.: Hillier & Sons, Winchester, England. Cat. 38T, p. 52, 1928.
