= Hill (disambiguation) =

A hill is a raised landform.

Hill may also refer to:

== Places ==
=== England ===
- Hill, Gloucestershire
- Hill, Warwickshire
- Hill, West Midlands

=== United States ===
- Hill, New Hampshire
- Hill, Wisconsin
- Fort A.P. Hill, a U.S. Army facility near Bowling Green, Virginia
- Hill Air Force Base, a U.S. Air Force facility near Ogden, Utah

=== Elsewhere ===
- Hill, Netherlands, a hamlet in the municipality of Altena, North Brabant
- Hill (stream), a 25-km-long stream that rises in the Eifel mountains, in Belgium
- Hill Island, Nunavut, Canada
- Electoral district of Hill, of the Legislative Assembly of Queensland, Australia

== People and fictional characters ==
- Hill (surname), a list of people and fictional characters
- Hill Harper (born 1966), American actor and author
- Hill Zaini (born 1987), Bruneian recording artist and actor
- Hill H. Wilson (1840-1896), American businessman and politician

== Other uses ==
- Embassy Hill, a 1970s Formula One team

== See also ==
- Hills (disambiguation)
- The Hill (disambiguation)
- The Hills (disambiguation)
- Hilly (disambiguation)
- Hillies (disambiguation)
- Hill City (disambiguation)
- Hill County (disambiguation)
- Hill Township (disambiguation)
- Hillfield (disambiguation), including Hill Field(s)
- Hillyfields (disambiguation), including Hilly Field(s)
- Mountain (disambiguation)
- Mount (disambiguation)
