= Ulmus × hollandica 'Elegantissima' =

Elm cultivar

- Hybrid parentage: U. glabra × U. minor
- Cultivar: 'Elegantissima'
- Origin: England

The hybrid elm cultivar Ulmus × hollandica 'Elegantissima' was the name given by A. R. Horwood in his Flora of Leicestershire and Rutland (1933) to an elm found in those counties and in neighbouring north Northamptonshire, the "type" locality being around the village of Launde, Leicestershire. The tree was later identified by Melville as a natural hybrid between Wych Elm and Plot Elm. According to Melville, the hybrid occurs in the main areas of Plot Elm distribution, where it is more common than Plot Elm itself. The tree is sometimes known simply as the 'Midlands Elm'. Cultivars believed to be of the U. glabra × U. plotii group have been planted in collections.

The tree should not be confused with U. suberosa (: minor?) elegantissima Hort. listed by Kirchner, in Kirchner & Petzold's Arboretum Muscaviense (1864), as a synonym for U. minor 'Viminalis Variegata' (:'Marginata').

== Description ==
Bean, following Melville, says the hybrid is variable in form, combining characteristics of Wych Elm and Plot Elm. The tree is said to have rather narrow leaves of leathery texture.

== Pests and diseases ==
'Elegantissima' is susceptible to Dutch elm disease.

== Cultivation ==
Hybrids labelled U. glabra × U. plotii survived at Kew Gardens until the 1970s. In 1976 and 1980, Melville found several in Didcot, at the Power Station, and Foscot Copse. No mature specimens are known to survive, though examples have been reported in the Brighton enclave. The tree is not known to have been introduced to North America. An U. glabra × U. plotii appears in the current (2022) elm-list of Royal Botanic Gardens Victoria (Melbourne), Australia.

An old Ulmus × hollandica, with pendulous habit and narrow leathery leaves recalling Horwood's 'Elegantissima' description, stands in the west-central avenue of Inverleith Park, Edinburgh (2026).

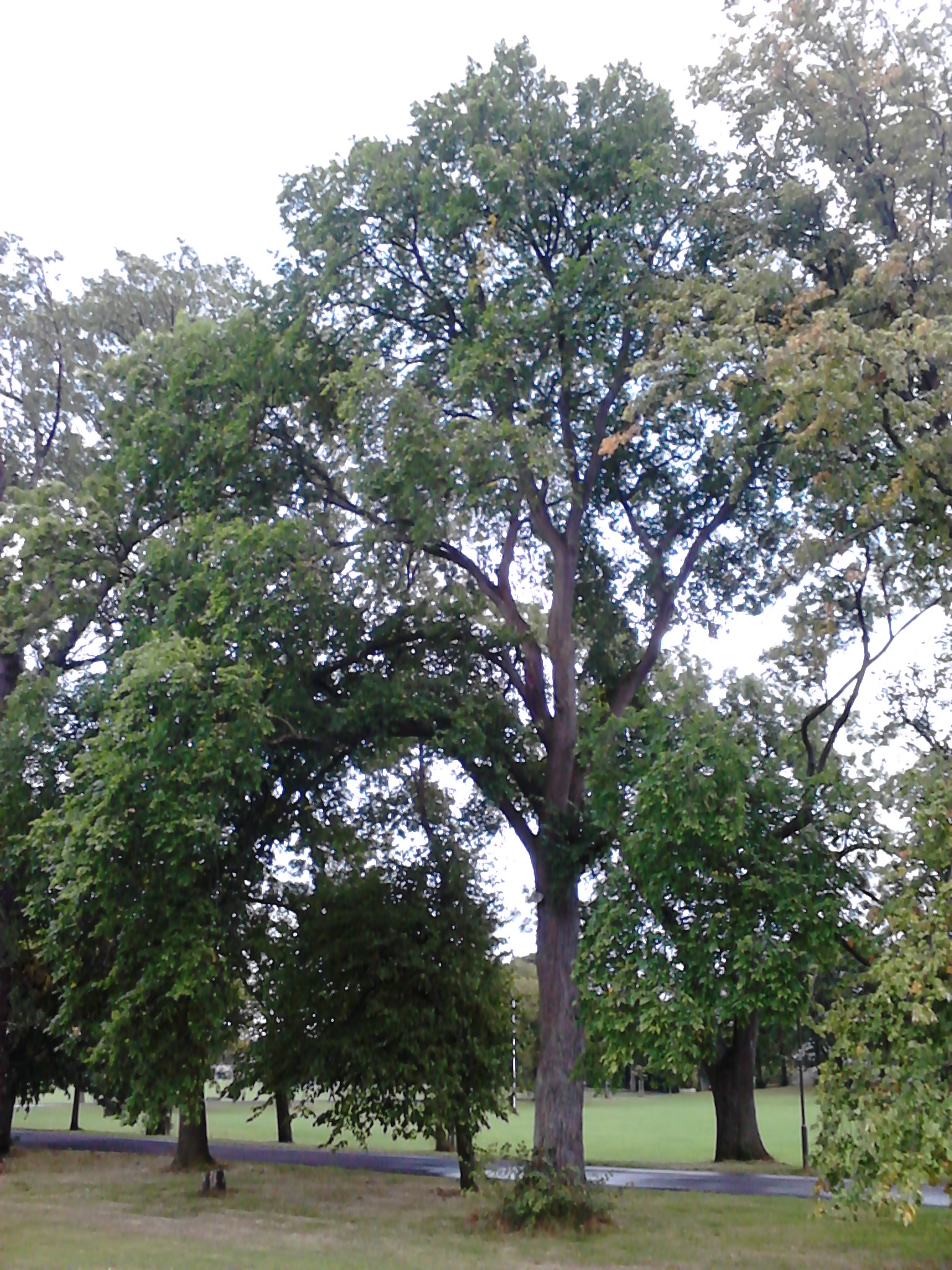
The west-central avenue Ulmus × hollandica, Inverleith Park, Edinburgh (2016)

Foliage of same

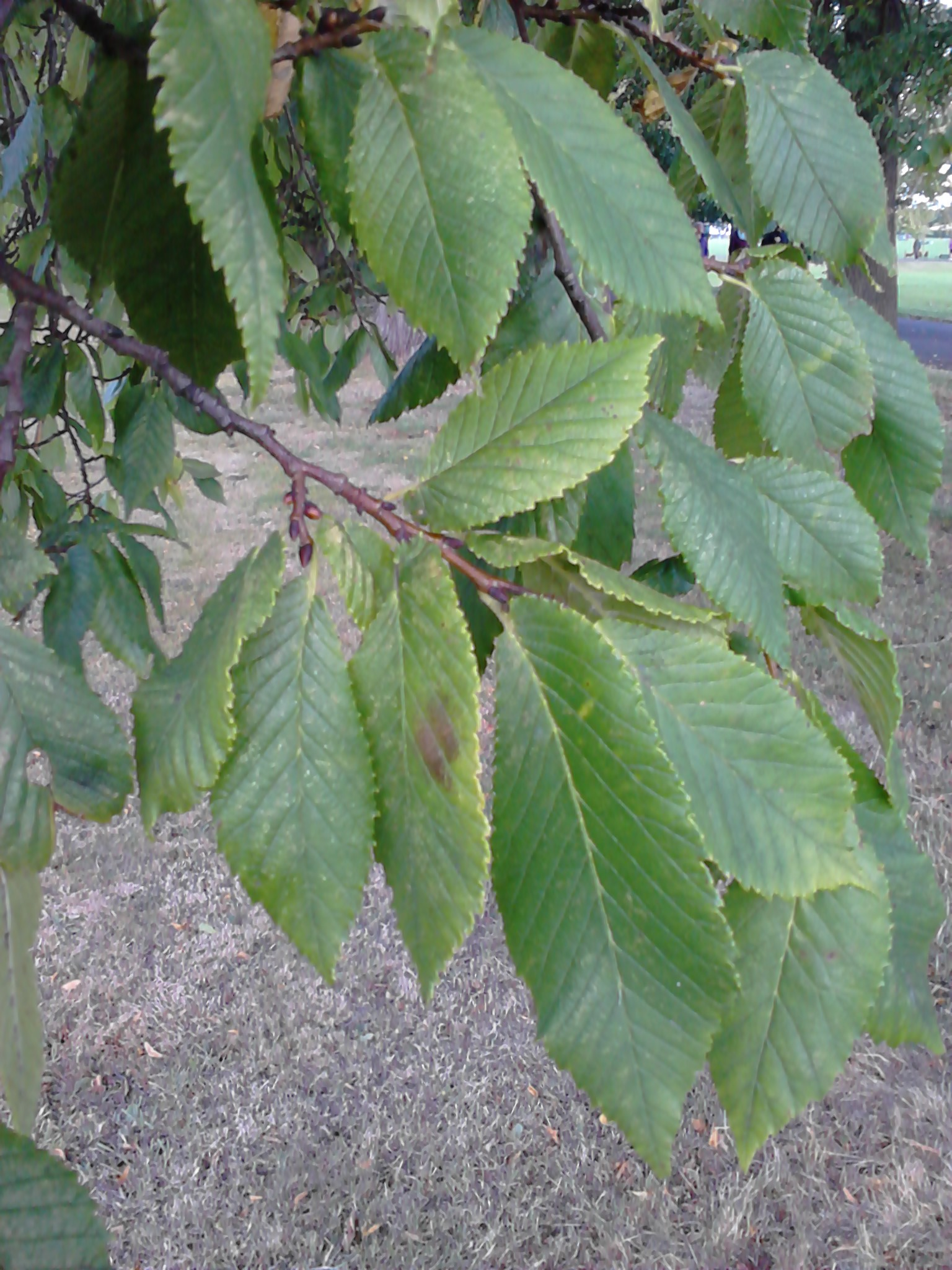
Leaves of same

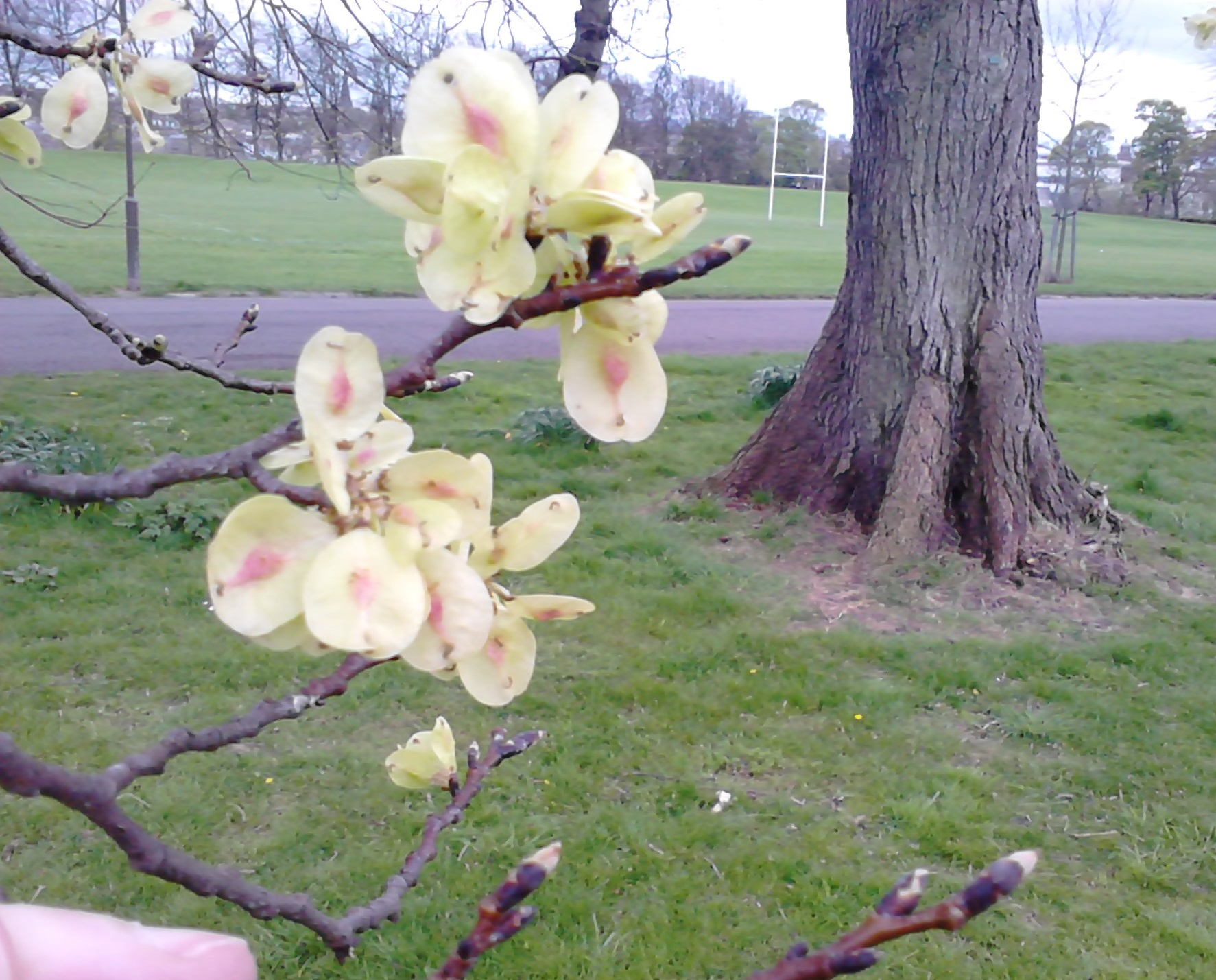
Fruit of same

== Synonymy ==
- Ulmus montana (: glabra) var. etrusca: Nicholson in Kew Hand-List Trees & Shrubs 2: 139. 1896 (?).

== Putative cultivars ==
Melville's 'Elegantissima' conjecture (wych × 'Plotii') for 'Jacqueline Hillier', found in a Birmingham garden, is not accepted by all authorities. The garden's owner told Hillier that the plant might have been introduced from outside the UK by a relative. Bonsai forms raised from it are likewise not confirmed 'Elegantissima' cultivars.

- 'Balder', 'Freja', 'Jacqueline Hillier', 'Loke', 'Odin', 'Tyr'.
