= Hillyfields =

Hillyfields or Hilly Fields may refer to:

== Places ==
- Hilly Fields, Colchester, a local nature reserve in Colchester, England
- Hilly Fields, Lewisham, a park in Lewisham, England
- Hilly Fields, a park in Enfield, England
- Hillyfields, Derbyshire, part of the village of North Wingfield, Derbyshire, England
- Hillyfields, Hampshire, a suburb of Southampton, England

== Other uses ==
- "Hilly Fields", a 1982 song by Nick Nicely

== See also ==
- , including Hillyfields
- , including Hilly Fields
- Hillfield (disambiguation), including Hill Field(s)
- Hill (disambiguation)
- Hilly (disambiguation)
- Hilly Flanks, areas around the Fertile Crescent
- Field (disambiguation)
- Fields (disambiguation)
