= Ulmus 'Jacqueline Hillier' =

Elm cultivar

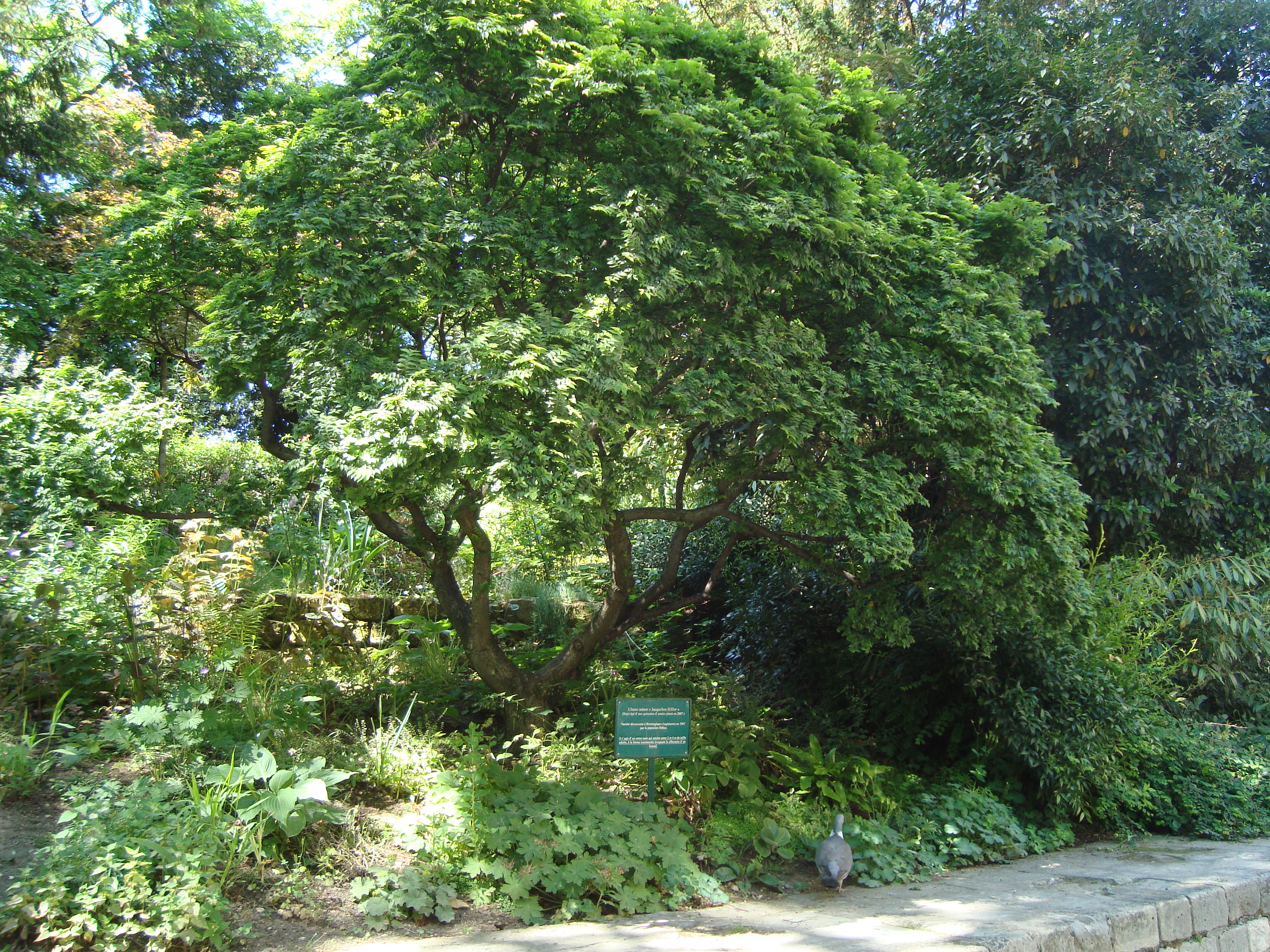
- 'Jacqueline Hillier', Arènes de Lutèce, Paris, 2007
- Genus: Ulmus
- Cultivar: 'Jacqueline Hillier'
- Origin: England

The 'dwarf' elm cultivar Ulmus 'Jacqueline Hillier' ('JH') is an elm of uncertain origin. It was cloned from a specimen found in a private garden in Selly Park, Birmingham, England, in 1966. The garden's owner told Hillier that it might have been introduced from outside the country by a relative. Hillier at first conjectured U. minor, as did Heybroek (2009). Identical-looking elm cultivars in Russia (if they are not imported 'JH') are labelled forms of Siberian Elm, Ulmus pumila, which is known to produce 'JH'-type long shoots. Melville considered 'JH' a hybrid cultivar from the 'Elegantissima' group of Ulmus × hollandica. Uncertainty about its parentage has led most nurserymen to list the tree simply as Ulmus 'Jacqueline Hillier'. 'JH' is not known to produce flowers and samarae, or (when grown from cuttings) root suckers.

Not to be confused with Ulmus × hollandica 'Hillieri', an older miniature elm from the same nursery.

== Description ==
With time 'JH' makes a large shrub, then a small tree, initially of dense habit, but spreading with age if left unpruned. It bears small, double-toothed scabrid leaves 2.5 cm to 3.5 cm long on densely hairy twigs. In winter its tidy 'herringbone' branches and branchlets proclaim it an elm, despite its shrublike size.

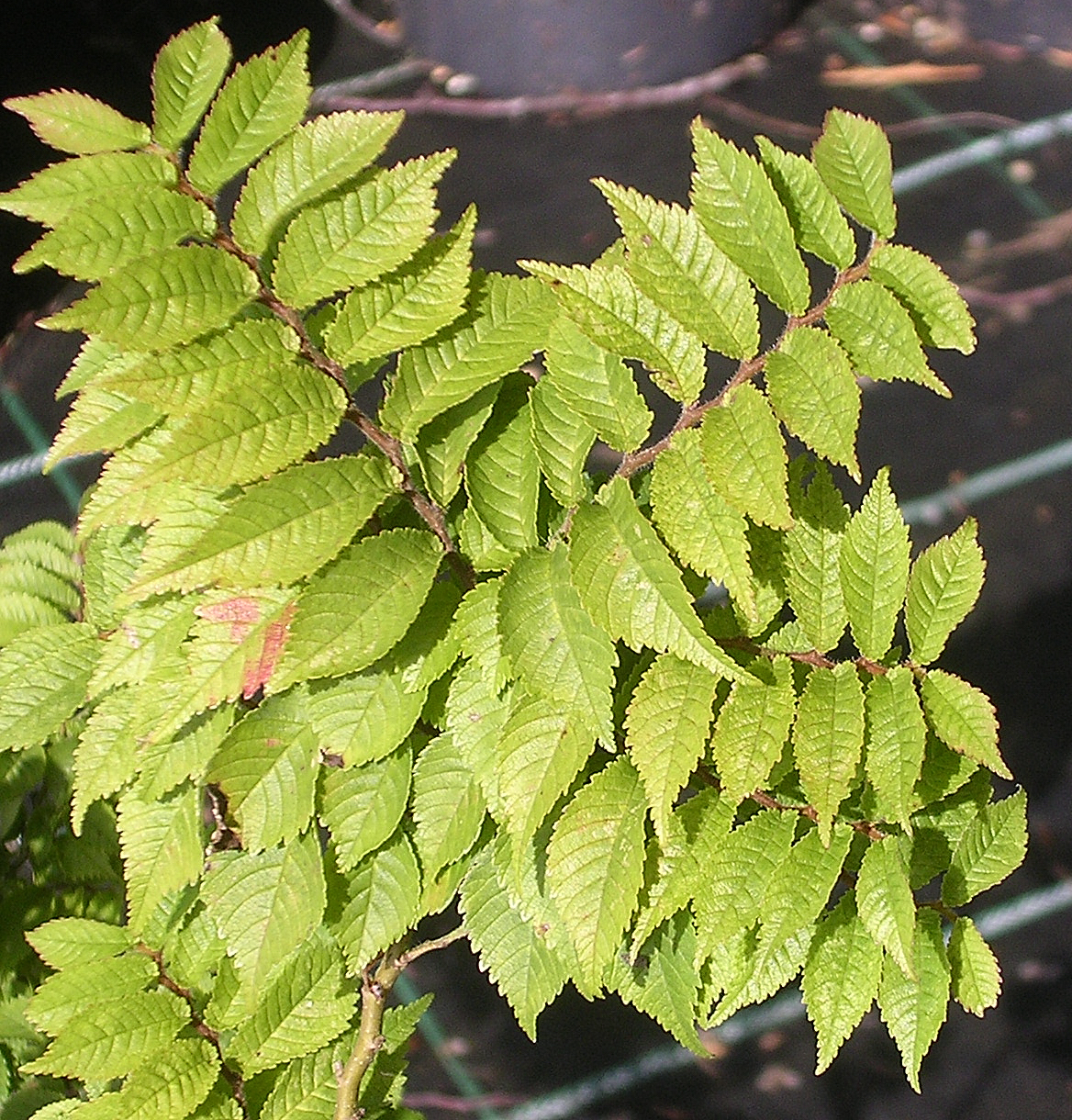
Foliage of 'JH'

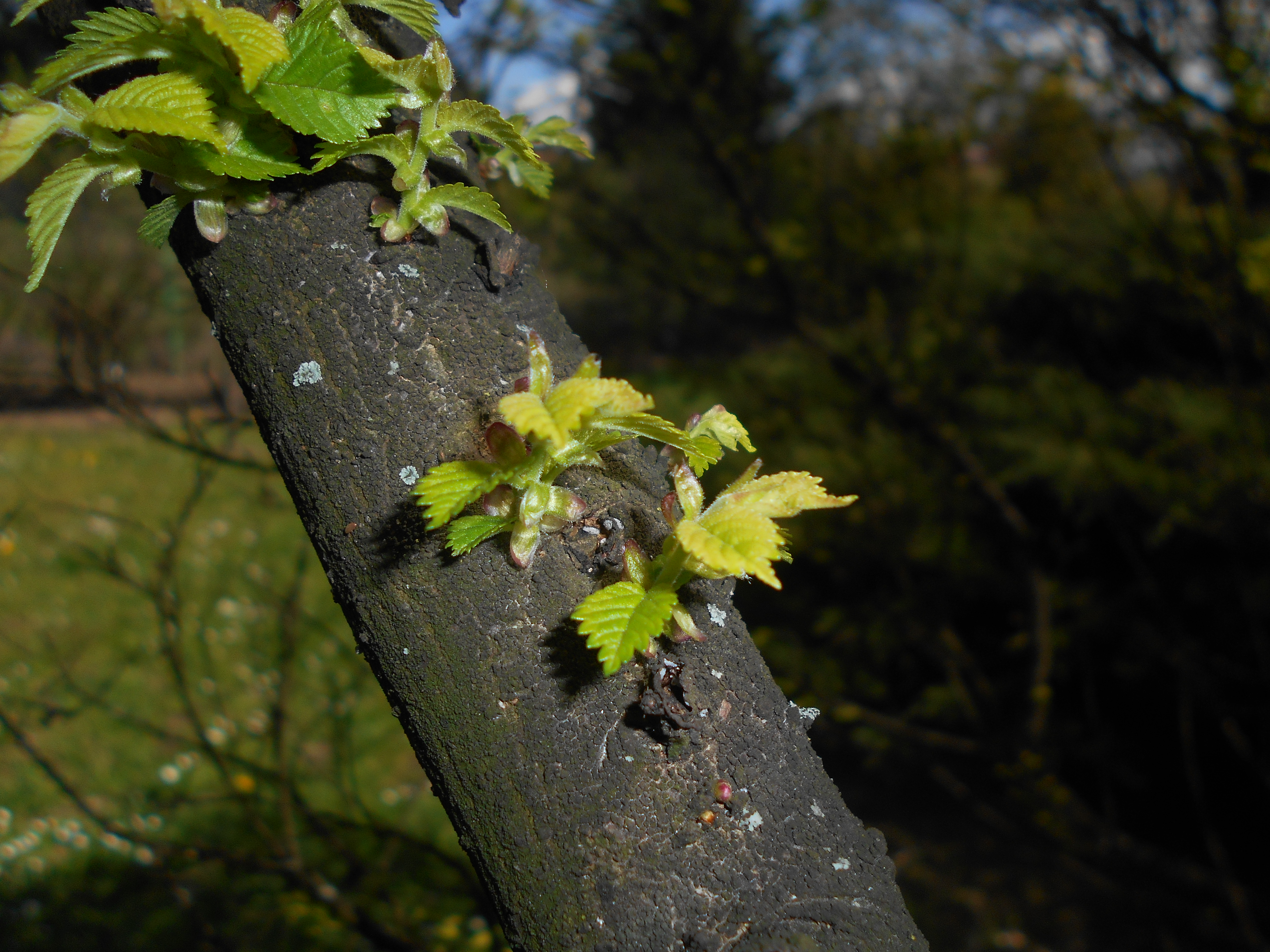
Bark of 'JH'

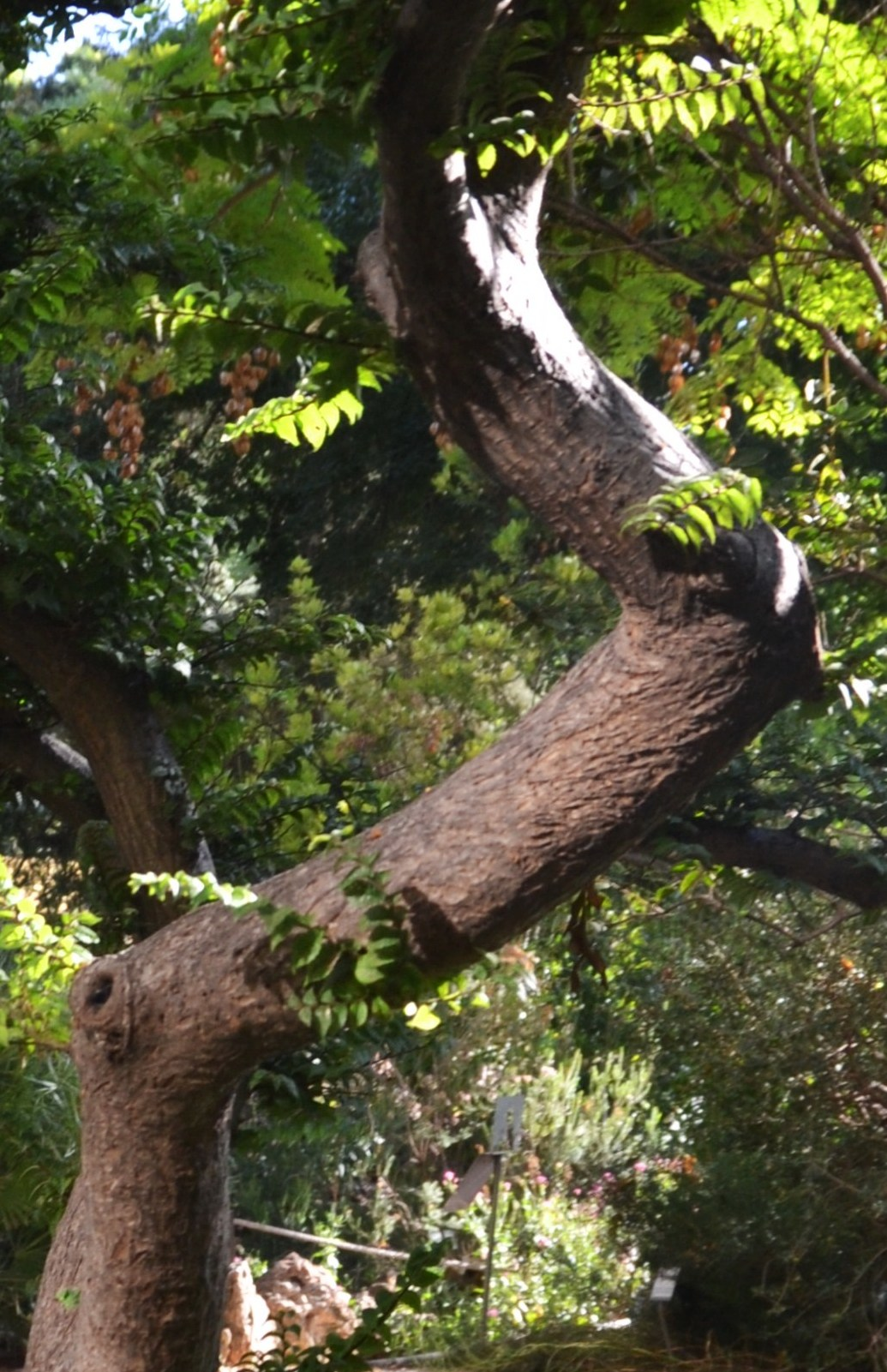
Same

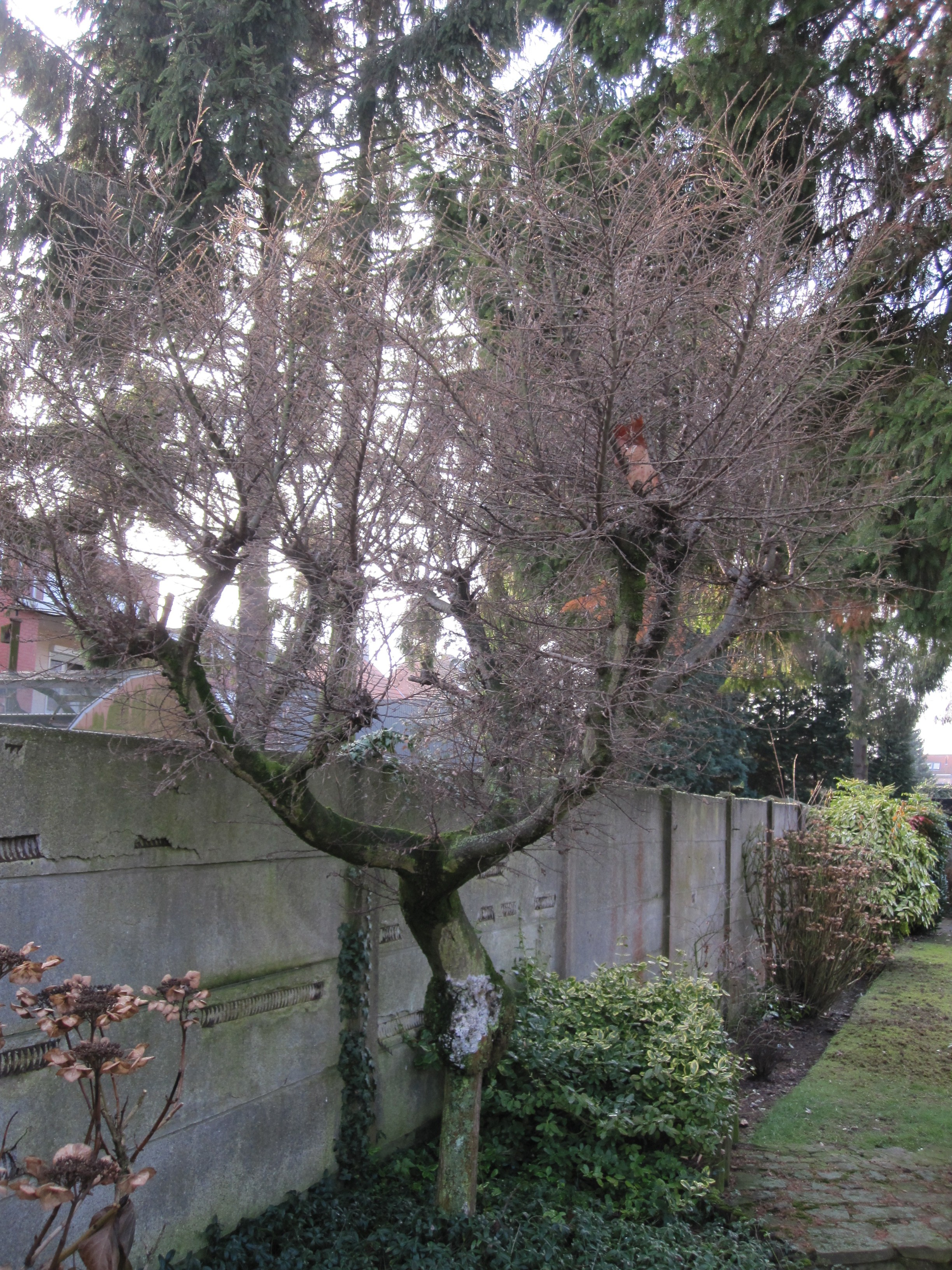
Pruned 'JH' in winter

== Pests and diseases ==
Resistance to Dutch elm disease is not known, but is probably academic as the tree is unlikely to attain the height at which it would attract the attention of the bark beetles that act as vectors of the disease. In trials in the United States, 'JH' was found to be virtually unaffected by the elm leaf beetle Xanthogaleruca luteola .

== Cultivation ==
'JH' is commonly found in cultivation in Europe and the United States, where it is considered particularly suitable for small gardens, rockeries, low hedges, and bonsai. It is said that a hardy tree can survive temperatures as low as −25 °F (−32 °C) in North America. Despite its dwarf nature and its reputation as a slow-grower, 'JH' is said to grow 6 ft (1.8 m) by 6 ft (1.8 m) in ten years, faster than the dwarf wych elm 'Nana'.

== Etymology ==
The cultivar was named for a daughter-in-law of Sir Harold Hillier by Roy Lancaster, when Curator of the Hillier Arboretum.

== Notable trees ==
The UK TROBI Champion grows at Talbot Manor in Norfolk, measuring 8 m high by 28 cm d.b.h. in 2008. Another at Exbury Gardens in Hampshire measured 6 m high by 35 cm d.b.h. in 2006 In keeping with the ancient tradition of planting funerary elms to commemorate the dead, specimens of 'Jacqueline Hillier' were planted on either side of the memorial to the dead in the Quintinshill rail disaster, Britain's worst rail disaster, in Rosebank Cemetery, Edinburgh.

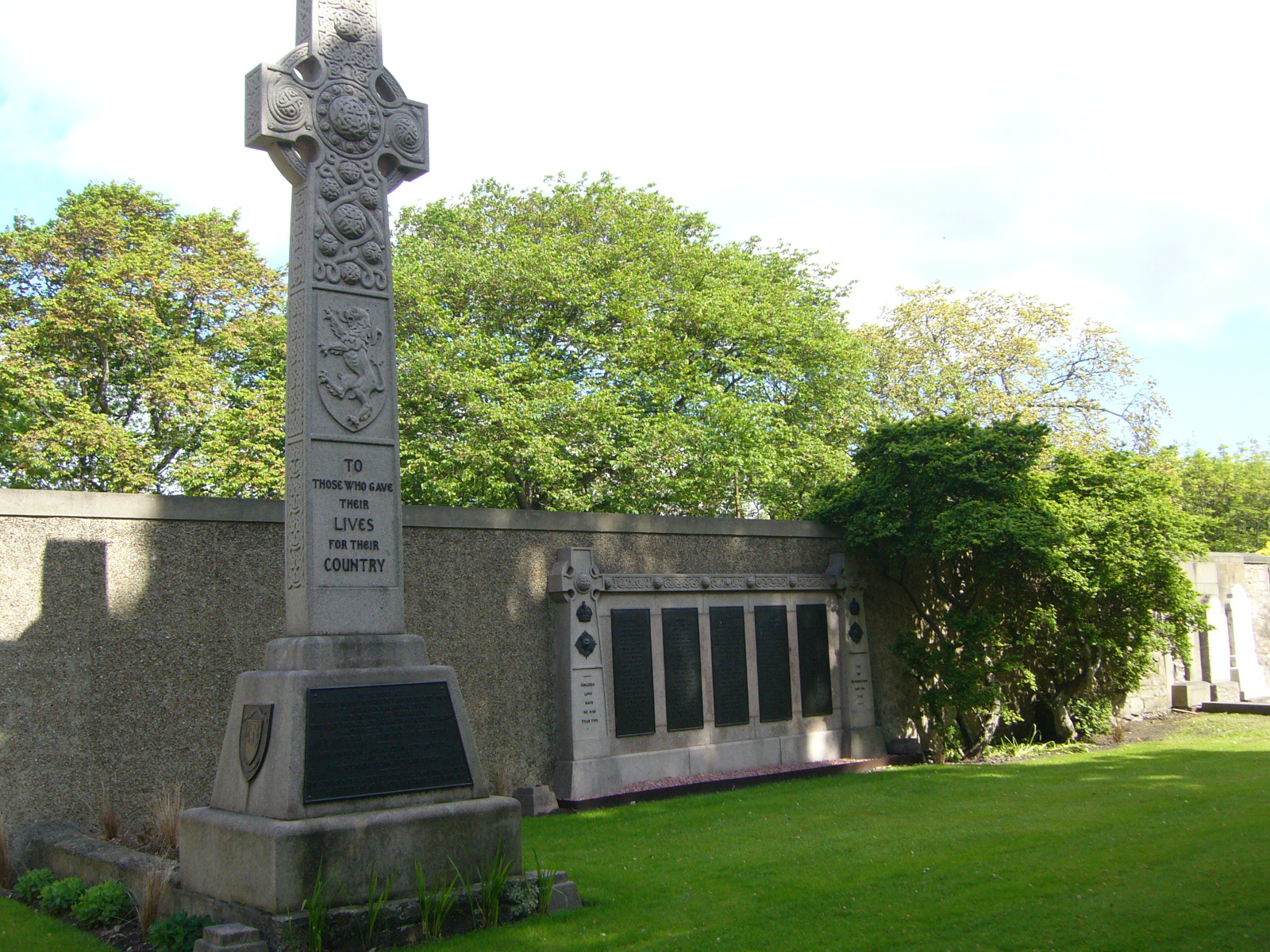
'JH' beside the Quintinshill Rail Disaster Memorial, Rosebank Cemetery, Edinburgh.

== Accessions ==
North America

- Chicago Botanic Garden, Illinois, US. 1 tree in Educational Center Gardens, listed as U. × hollandica 'Jacqueline Hillier'.
- Dawes Arboretum , Ohio, US. 3 trees, no acc. details available.
- Scott Arboretum, US. Acc. no. 93-518

Europe

- Arboretum de La Petite Loiterie , Monthodon, France. No details available
- Bradenham Hall Garden & Arboretum, Thetford, Norfolk, UK . One tree planted 1986.
- Brighton & Hove City Council, UK. NCCPG Elm Collection.
- Dubrava Arboretum, Lithuania. As U. × hollandica 'Jacqueline Hillier', no other details available.
- ELTE Botanic Garden, Budapest, Hungary. Acc. no. 19981834
- Granada Arboretum, Jodrell Bank, Cheshire, UK. UK Champion, 6 m high, 38 cm d.b.h. in 2004.
- Grange Farm Arboretum , Lincs., UK. Acc. no. 835.
- Hortus Botanicus Nationalis, Salaspils, Latvia. Acc. nos. 18122,3,4,5 (as U. hollandica 'Jacqueline Hillier').
- Linnaean Gardens of Uppsala, Finland. Acc. no. 2008-0277
- Royal Botanic Gardens Kew, UK. Acc. no. 1997-31
- Royal Horticultural Society Gardens, Wisley, UK. No details available
- Strona Arboretum, University of Life Sciences, Warsaw, Poland. As U. minor 'Jacqueline Hillier'.
- University of Copenhagen Botanic Garden, Denmark. Acc. no. P1982-5281
- University Parks, Oxford, UK. No details available
- University of Oxford Botanic Garden, UK. Acc. no. 1999115.2
- Westonbirt Arboretum , Tetbury, Glos., UK. (As U. minor 'Jacqueline Hillier'). Acc. nos 1987/762, 1993/187.

Australasia

- Eastwoodhill Arboretum , Gisborne, New Zealand. 1 tree, details not known.

== Nurseries ==
North America

Widely available

Europe

Widely available
