= Sharon Hillier =

American microbiologist

- Born: 1954 (age 71–72) (Note: In 2001, Hillier was reported to be 47); Seattle
- Spouse: Butch
- Children: 2

Academic background
- Education: B.S., Bacteriology and Public Health, 1976, Washington State University; PhD., Bacteriology and Public Health, 1982, Washington State University
- Thesis: The glyoxylate cycle enzymes and intermediates in Yersinia pestis: diagnostic applications and a possible role in the infectious process (1982)

Academic work
- Institutions: University of Washington; University of Pittsburgh Medical Center

Sharon Louise Hillier (born 1954) is an American microbiologist. She is the Richard Sweet Endowed Chair in Reproductive Infectious Disease and vice chair of the department of obstetrics, gynecology and reproductive sciences at the University of Pittsburgh Medical Center (UPMC) and Magee-Women's Research Institute.

== Early life and education ==
Hillier was born and raised in Seattle, where she attended Washington State University for her Bachelor of Science and doctoral degrees.

== Career ==
While finishing her doctoral degree at Washington State University, Hillier studied the bubonic plague and began to specialize in sexually transmitted diseases. This led her to join the HIV movement led by Polly Harrison and formed the Alliance for Microbicide Development. She co-published a study in 1991 titled Reliability of diagnosing bacterial vaginosis is improved by a standardized method of gram stain interpretation and attended the first White House Conference on HIV and AIDS in 1995 but was met with resistance.

Hillier began teaching at the University of Washington as a research associate professor of obstetrics, gynecology and microbiology, before joining the faculty at the University of Pittsburgh Medical Center in 1995. While at UPMC, Hillier continued her study into HIV and Aids and founded the Microbiocide Trials Network (MTN), an international research program which studies ways to stop transmission of sexually transmitted diseases. After a failed study conducted in 2001 showed nonoxynol did not prevent HIV infections, her project tried studies on spermicides and substances designed to block the entry of viruses into cells, both of which failed. During this time, she was appointed president of the Infectious Diseases Society for Obstetrics and Gynecology and sat on the board of the International Society for Sexually Transmitted Disease Research.

In 2009, it was announced that Hillier would lead a National Institutes of Health funded project to identify novel bacteria that might play a role in the development of pelvic inflammatory diseases. She also received the American Sexually Transmitted Diseases Association's Thomas Parran Award during the International Society for Sexually Transmitted Diseases Research (ISSTDR) meeting "for her distinguished contributions to the field of STD research and prevention." The following year, Hillier led a study in five countries of sub-Saharan Africa regarding the effectiveness of topical microbicides and prophylactic use of antiretroviral drugs in preventing the sexual transmission of HIV. One of the studies proved tenofovir gel was successful in preventing HIV infections although it was unable to be reproduced by outside labs.

By 2013, the MTN conducted 13 trials and was granted $70 million to develop and test HIV prevention products. The research was specifically focused on individuals who are having sex with men as they are at the highest risk. During this time, she also served as chair of the NIH Office of AIDS Research Advisory Council. In 2015, Hillier and Lisa Rohan conducted and concluded the first human clinical trials for antiretroviral containing vaginal film products intended to prevent HIV infection. She also sat on the editorial boards of Infectious Diseases in Obstetrics and Gynecology, Reviews in Contemporary Pharmacotherapy, Sexually Transmitted Diseases and Anaerobe. In 2019, Hillier was the recipient of the Pittsburgh Women who Rock Award from the UPMC Health Plan and UPMC Magee-Women's Hospital.

== Personal life ==
Hillier and her husband Butch have two children together.
