= Hilly Fields, Colchester =

Nature reserve in Colchester, UK

Coordinates: 51.8926°N 0.8863°E

Hilly Fields
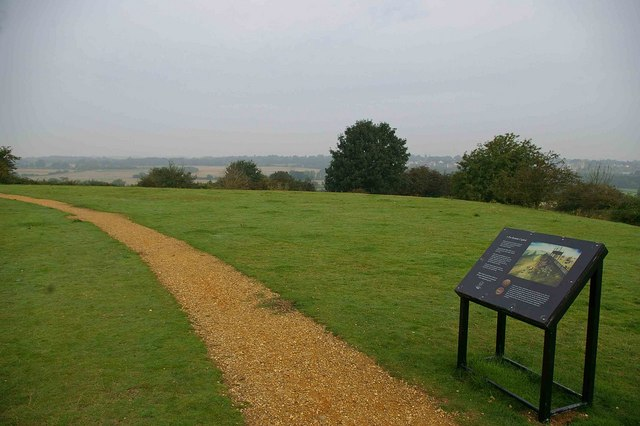
- Interactive map of Hilly Fields
- Type: Local Nature Reserve
- Location: Colchester, Essex
- OS grid: TL 987 255
- Area: 37.5 hectares (93 acres)
- Manager: Colchester Borough Council

Hilly Fields is a 37.5 hectare Local Nature Reserve in Colchester, Essex. It is owned and managed by Colchester Borough Council. It is also a scheduled monument as it is in a late Iron Age site and Roman Camulodunum.

The site has diverse habitats of grassland, woods, hedges, scrub, ponds, and marsh. The grassland is grazed by rabbits, and invertebrates include minotaur beetles and beewolf wasps. The woodland is mainly oak, ash and hawthorn, and the pond banks have reedmace and reed sweet-grass.

There is access from Sussex Road.
