= Le Chant des Wallons =

Regional anthem of Wallonia, Belgium

English: The Song of the Walloons
- Regional anthem of Wallonia
- Lyrics: Théophile Bovy, 1900
- Music: Louis Hillier, 1901
- Adopted: 1998

Audio sample
- Instrumental rendition in B-flat major.: file; help

"The Song of the Walloons" (Walloon: Li tchant des Walons; French: Le Chant des Wallons) is the regional anthem of Wallonia in Belgium. The original lyrics were written by Théophile Bovy in 1900 in the Walloon language. A year later, it was set to music composed by Louis Hillier. Performed for the first time in the city of Liège, the song quickly spread to other parts of French-speaking Belgium and established itself like a "national" anthem for Wallonia.

It was approved on 15 July 1998 by the Parliament of Wallonia, along with the region's coat of arms and flag.

== Lyrics ==
Typically, only the first and third verses are performed.

Walloon lyrics

Nos estans firs di nosse pitite patreye,
Ca lådje et lon, on djåze di ses efants.
Å prumî rang, on l' mete po l' industreye
Et dvins les årts, ele riglatixh ostant.
Nosse tere est ptite, mins nos avans l' ritchesse
Des omes sincieus k' anôblixhèt leu nom.
Et nos avans des libertés timpesse:
Vola pocwè k' on-z est firs d' esse Walons !

Di nosse passé cwand c' est k' on lét l' istwere,
On s' recresteye vormint a tchaeke foyou.
Et nosse cour crexhe cwand c' est k' on tuze al glwere
Di nos vîs peres ki n' avît måy pawou.
C' est gråce a zels ki ns djouwixhans del påye.
Il ont språtchî l' innmi dzo leu talon.
On ls a rclamé les pus vayants k' i gn åye:
Vola pocwè k' on-z est fir d' esse Walon !

Pitit payis, vos k' a tant d' grandeu d' åme,
Nos vos inmans bén, sins k' nos l' breyanxhe tot hôt.
Cwand on vs kidjåze, ås ouys montèt nos låmes
Et nos sintans nosse cour bate a gros côps !
N' åyîz nole sogne et vikez e liyesse,
Di vos efants, les bresses et l' cour sont bons.
Et nos avans les tchveas foirt près del tiesse:
Vola pocwè k' on-z est fir d' esse Walon !

On s' voet voltî inte frés del Walonreye
Et on-z est presse onk l' ôte a s' diner l' mwin.
On fwait plaijhi bén sovint sins k' on l' deye.
Nouk ni s' håynêye cwand c' est k' i vout fé l' bén.
Li tchårité ki mousse el måjhinete
N' î va k' al nute avou meye precôcions.
Li pô k' on dene on nel dene k' e catchete:
Vola pocwè k' on-z est fir d' esse Walon !

French lyrics

Nous sommes fiers de notre Wallonie,
Le monde entier admire ses enfants.
Au premier rang brille son industrie
Et dans les arts on l'apprécie autant.
Bien que petit, notre pays surpasse
Par ses savants de plus grandes nations.
Et nous voulons des libertés en masse :
Voilà pourquoi l'on est fier d'être Wallons !

Entre Wallons, toujours on fraternise.
Dans le malheur, on aime s'entraider :
On fait le bien sans jamais qu'on le dise,
En s'efforçant de le tenir caché.
La charité visitant la chaumière
S'y prend le soir avec cent précautions :
On donne peu, mais c'est d'un cœur sincère :
Voilà pourquoi l'on est fier d'être Wallons !

Petit pays, c'est pour ta grandeur d'âme
Que nous t'aimons, sans trop le proclamer.
Notre œil se voile aussitôt qu'on te blâme
Et notre cœur est prêt à se briser.
Ne crains jamais les coups de l'adversaire.
De tes enfants les bras te défendront
Il ne faut pas braver notre colère:
Voilà pourquoi l'on est fier d'être Wallons !

On s'aime entre frères de Wallonie
Et on est prêts l'un l'autre à se donner la main.
On fait plaisir bien souvent sans qu'on ne le dise.
Nul ne s'affiche quand il veut faire le bien.
La charité qui entre dans la maisonnette
N'y va que de nuit avec mille précautions.
Le peu qu'on donne on ne le donne qu'en cachette:
Voilà pourquoi nous sommes fiers d'êtres Wallons !

English translation

Of our Wallonia we are proud.
Rever’d are Her children o’er the world.
Behold the triumph of Her industry,
The grandeur of Her arts!
Though our land be small, yet Her science
That of many a populous nation surpasseth
Our freedom is what we yearn for most
’Tis why we’re proud to be Walloons!

We, Walloons, brothers to each other
And assuage one another in disaster
Without boast we succeed
And try to keep it classified
Charity a poor cottage visiteth
By night and cautiously goeth
A bit we may give, but from the heart it cometh.
’Tis why we’re proud to be Walloons!

O humble land of Wallonia,
O land of our hearts’ desire, with prudence we hail Thee.
Saddened we are when men speak ill of Thee.
’Tis heartbreaking truly!
But fear not the foe's attacks
Thy children shall defend Thine honour arch.
Who dareth our anger pique?
’Tis why we’re proud to be Walloons!

As brothers in Wallonia we love each other
We’re pleased to shake hands with one another.
Yet we’re content of not often revealing so.
When it wants to do good no one appeareth.
The house that charity entereth
That to night with a thousand cares goeth.
The little that giveth no one in secret giveth:
’Tis why we’re proud to be Walloons!

== See also ==
- La Brabançonne
- De Vlaamse Leeuw
