= Charles Hillyer (cricketer) =

English cricketer

Personal information
- Born: 4 August 1845; Biddenden, Kent
- Died: 4 October 1872 (aged 27); Woodchurch, Kent

Domestic team information
- Years: Team
- 1868: Kent
- Only FC: 5 August 1868 Kent v Gentlemen of the MCC

Career statistics
Competition	First-class
Matches	1
Runs scored	6
Batting average	3.00
100s/50s	0/0
Top score	6
Balls bowled	56
Wickets	1
Bowling average	34.00
5 wickets in innings	0
10 wickets in match	0
Best bowling	1/6
Catches/stumpings	1/–
- Source: Cricinfo, 10 March 2017

Charles Hillyer (4 August 1845 – 4 October 1872) was an English cricketer. He played one first-class match for Kent County Cricket Club in 1868.

Hillyer was born at Biddenden in Kent in 1845, the son of Charles and Eliza Hillyer (née Bean). His father was employed as a bailiff on a farm in the area and Charles was one of 11 children. He is known to have played village cricket in Kent and Sussex, including at Woodchurch, Lydd, Rolvenden and Rye, (Note: Woodchurch, where Hillyer lived for most of his life, is in south Kent, close to the border with Sussex.) and in 1867 top-scored for Ashford Cricket Club against the United South of England Eleven with 22 runs. (Note: The match was an "odds" match with Ashford fielding 22 players against the opposition's 11; Ashford scored 78 runs in their first inning and 73 in their second.)

The following season Hillyer was one of two Kent professionals who made their only appearances for the county in first-class matches in a match against the Gentlemen of the Marylebone Cricket Club during the 1868 Canterbury Cricket Week. (Note: The match featured twelve players on each team.) A major social occasion, matches such as this would usually be reserved for amateur players, and it is thought that Hillyer and Thomas Tidy, the other Kent debutant, may have been drafted into the team as late replacements. In his only first-class match Hillyer scored six runs in Kent's first innings and took a single wicket.

Professionally Hillyer worked as a butcher and lived most of his life at Woodchurch. He married Sarah Chasmar in 1866; the couple had one son, also named Charles. Hillyer died of tuberculosis at Woodchurch in 1872. He was aged only 27.

== Bibliography ==
- Carlaw, Derek (2020). Kent County Cricketers, A to Z: Part One (1806–1914) (PDF). Cardiff: ACS.
