= Hillies =

Hillies may refer to:

- The Hillies, a region of Bracebridge Heath, Lincoln, England, UK
- The Hillies, athletic teams of Haverhill High School, Haverhill, Massachusetts, US
- Haverhill Hillies, a 1900s minor league baseball team based in Haverhill, Massachusetts, US
- Newburgh Hillies, a 1900s baseball team in the Hudson River League based in Newburgh, New York State, US
- Pittsfield Hillies, a 1920s minor league baseball team based in Pittsfield, Massachusetts, US

== See also ==
- Hillbilly
- Hilly (disambiguation)
- Hill (disambiguation)
- Hillbilly
