= Senator Hillyer =

Senator Hillyer may refer to:

- Charles T. Hillyer (1800–1891), Connecticut State Senate
- George Hillyer (1835–1927), Georgia State Senate

== See also ==
- Hillyer (disambiguation)
