= Orictites costulipennis =

Scientific classification
- Domain: Eukaryota
- Kingdom: Animalia
- Phylum: Arthropoda
- Class: Insecta
- Order: Coleoptera
- Suborder: Adephaga
- Family: Carabidae
- Subfamily: Scaritinae
- Tribe: Clivinini
- Genus: Orictites
- Species: O. costulipennis

Binomial name
- Orictites costulipennis (Bates, 1892)

Synonyms
- Clivina costulipennis Bates, 1892

Species of beetle

Orictites costulipennis is a species of ground beetle in the family Carabidae, found in Indomalaya.
