= Barbara Hillyer =

American academic and feminist activist (1934–2024)

- Born: Barbara Gene Hillyer; March 1, 1934; Creston, Iowa
- Died: March 9, 2024 (aged 90); Oklahoma City, Oklahoma
- Known for: Founding director of Women's Studies at the University of Oklahoma; scholarship on feminism and disability
- Awards: Emily Toth Award (1994), Outstanding Academic Book (Association of College and Research Libraries Choice)

Academic background
- Education: Rockford College (BA), Claremont Graduate University (graduate studies), University of Wisconsin–Madison (PhD)

Academic work
- Discipline: Women's studies, feminism, disability studies
- Institutions: University of Oklahoma, Mundelein College
- Notable works: Feminism and Disability (1993)

Barbara Hillyer or Hillyer-Davis (March 1, 1934 – March 9, 2024) was an American academic and feminist activist. She was the founding director of the Women's Studies courses at the University of Oklahoma. Her 1993 book, Feminism and Disability was the 1994 Emily Toth Award winner for the best feminist publication of the year and was also named as Outstanding Academic Book by the Association of College and Research Libraries's Choice Magazine. Her work explored the response of the disability and feminist rights movements to aging, chronic illness, disability, and mental health.

== Early life, education, and family ==
Barbara Gene Hillyer was born on March 1, 1934, in Creston, Iowa, to Grace (née Coy) and Murrel Newman Hillyer. Her mother died when she was three and her father remarried the following year to Wanda Griswold. When she was six, her family relocated to Kansas City, Missouri, where her father managed movie theaters for fifteen years.

Upon completing high school, Hillyer earned an undergraduate degree at Rockford College, graduate studies at Claremont Graduate University, and a PhD at the University of Wisconsin–Madison.

After completing her doctorate in 1958, she traveled in Europe for more than two months before returning to marry Robert M. Davis, a fellow alumni from Madison. The couple would later divorce after having been married for twenty-two years. Hillyer privately married poet and English professor Abigail Keegan in 1995. The couple was married publicly and legally in 2021.

== Career ==
In 1962, when Robert was hired at Loyola University, the couple moved to Chicago, and Hillyer began teaching at Mundelein College. She followed him when he was appointed to the University of California at Davis and then they moved to Norman, Oklahoma, in the mid-1960s with their three children, when Robert was hired at the University of Oklahoma. Hillyer was involved in the civil rights movement and transitioned into the women's movement, becoming involved with the National Women's Political Caucus' lobbying efforts for passage of the Equal Rights Amendment. In 1973, she was hired as a visiting assistant professor of English at the University of Oklahoma. Simultaneously, she gave workshops for the Women's Resource Center of Norman, directed the Limits-to Freedom Project for the Oklahoma Public Library Systems, and served as chair of the Norman branch of the Women's Caucus.

In 1976, Hillyer was hired as an assistant professor and the director of Women's Studies. She was the only faculty member appointed in the new undergraduate degree program, which was the first of its kind in Oklahoma. By 1978, the program was expanded to include a master's degree. In 1982, she was promoted to associate professor and continued as director of the Women's Studies and Human Relations program until 1988. The Board of Regents of the university honored her with a Regent's Award for superior teaching in 1990. In 1996, Hillyer was promoted to full professor and chair of the Department of Human Relations. She continued as chair until 2001.

== Academic work ==
Hillyer's publications initially focused on issues of the women's movement, but by 1983, she was writing and lecturing about women and disability. Her works examined diversity within the feminist movement, as well as the various categories that make up a woman's identity. She recognized the need for feminism to represent various constituency groups and questioned the response of feminists to address the concerns of diverse sectors of society, such as activists, academics, LGBT members, ethnic groups, and religious affiliations. Hillyer also analyzed the internal relationships that make up identity and society's response to the needs and interests of women with disabilities. She noted that disability forced a reciprocity on the relationship between people as it involved reliance upon others, an ability to give and receive help and empathy, and delegation of responsibility while simultaneously respecting boundaries. Evaluating the relationship between chronic illness, degenerative conditions, and mental health, Hillyer noted that mourning and grief were often recurrent issues for both the person who is cared for and the carer.

Hillyer's 1993 book Feminism and Disability was the 1994 Emily Toth Award winner for the best feminist publication of the year, and was also named as Outstanding Academic Book by the Association of College and Research Libraries's Choice Magazine. In separating biology from gender, Hillyer noted that the women's movement had sought to remove stereotypes about women's identity rooted in thoughts that they were biologically predetermined to be weak, inferior, and self-sacrificing carers. In the book, Hillyer drew on her experience as a mother who raised a child with disability and re-examined her ideas of women's autonomy and self-sufficiency. The book was a critical examination of the limitations of the disability rights and feminist movement and the value placed by society upon productivity. Hillyer recognized that some people are unable to maintain themselves and that binary strong versus weak comparisons failed to allow people to integrate their full potential in their idea of self. In later works, Hillyer also explored the issues of body and its effects from aging on identity.

== Death and legacy ==
Hillyer died in Oklahoma City, Oklahoma, on March 9, 2024, at the age of 90. According to author and scholar Deborah Kent, who is blind, Hillyer's work broke new ground in looking at the foundations of theory in the disability rights and feminist movements. She was interviewed about lesbian life in the Oklahoma City metropolitan area during her era, as part of the Oklahoma Unheard Voices Project a Lesbian Oral History program of the Oklahoma Metropolitan Library System.

== Selected works ==
- Hillyer-Davis, Barbara; Frech, Patricia A. (Summer 1981). "Diversity, Fragmentation, Integration: The NWSA Balancing Act". Frontiers: A Journal of Women Studies. 6 (1–2). Lincoln, Nebraska: University of Nebraska Press: 60–64. doi:10.2307/3346493. ISSN 0160-9009. JSTOR 3346493. OCLC 5546262349.
- Hillyer-Davis, Barbara (Winter 1981). "Teaching the Feminist Minority". Women's Studies Quarterly. 9 (4). Old Westbury, New York: Feminist Press: 7–8. ISSN 0732-1562. JSTOR 40003956. OCLC 5547294914.
- Hillyer, Barbara (1984). "Women, Disability, and Feminism: Notes toward a New Theory". Frontiers: A Journal of Women Studies. 8 (1). Lincoln, Nebraska: University of Nebraska Press: 1–5. doi:10.2307/3346081. ISSN 0160-9009. JSTOR 3346081. OCLC 5546262622.
- Hillyer, Barbara (1985). Feminist Education. Journal of Thought. Vol. 20. Norman, Oklahoma: University of Oklahoma. OCLC 241588025.
- Hillyer, Barbara (June 1987). "Disability and Grief". Families in Society. 68 (6). New York, New York: Family Service America: 352–357. doi:10.1177/104438948706800605. ISSN 1044-3894. OCLC 7588014703. S2CID 149706884.
- Hillyer, Barbara (1993). Feminism and Disability. Norman, Oklahoma: University of Oklahoma Press. ISBN 978-0-8061-2979-2.
- Hillyer, Barbara (1998). "The Embodiment of Old Women: Silences". Frontiers: A Journal of Women Studies. 19 (1). Lincoln, Nebraska: University of Nebraska Press: 48–60. doi:10.2307/3347132. ISSN 0160-9009. JSTOR 3347132. OCLC 936788370.
