= Théophile Bovy =

Belgian journalist and poet

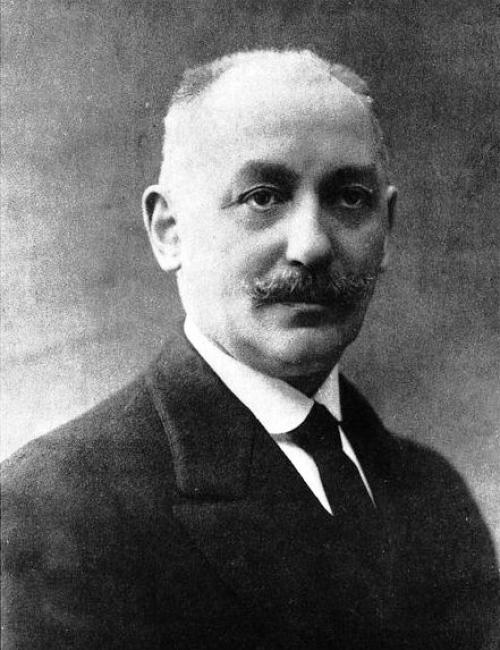
Théophile Bovy

Théophile Bovy (March 8, 1863 – June 6, 1937) was a Belgian journalist, poet and dramatic author in Wallonia, who wrote the words of the Le Chant des Wallons, the Walloon national anthem.

He was the father of actress Berthe Bovy.

== Sources ==
- Cent Wallons
