= Charles Warne =

English antiquarian and archaeologist

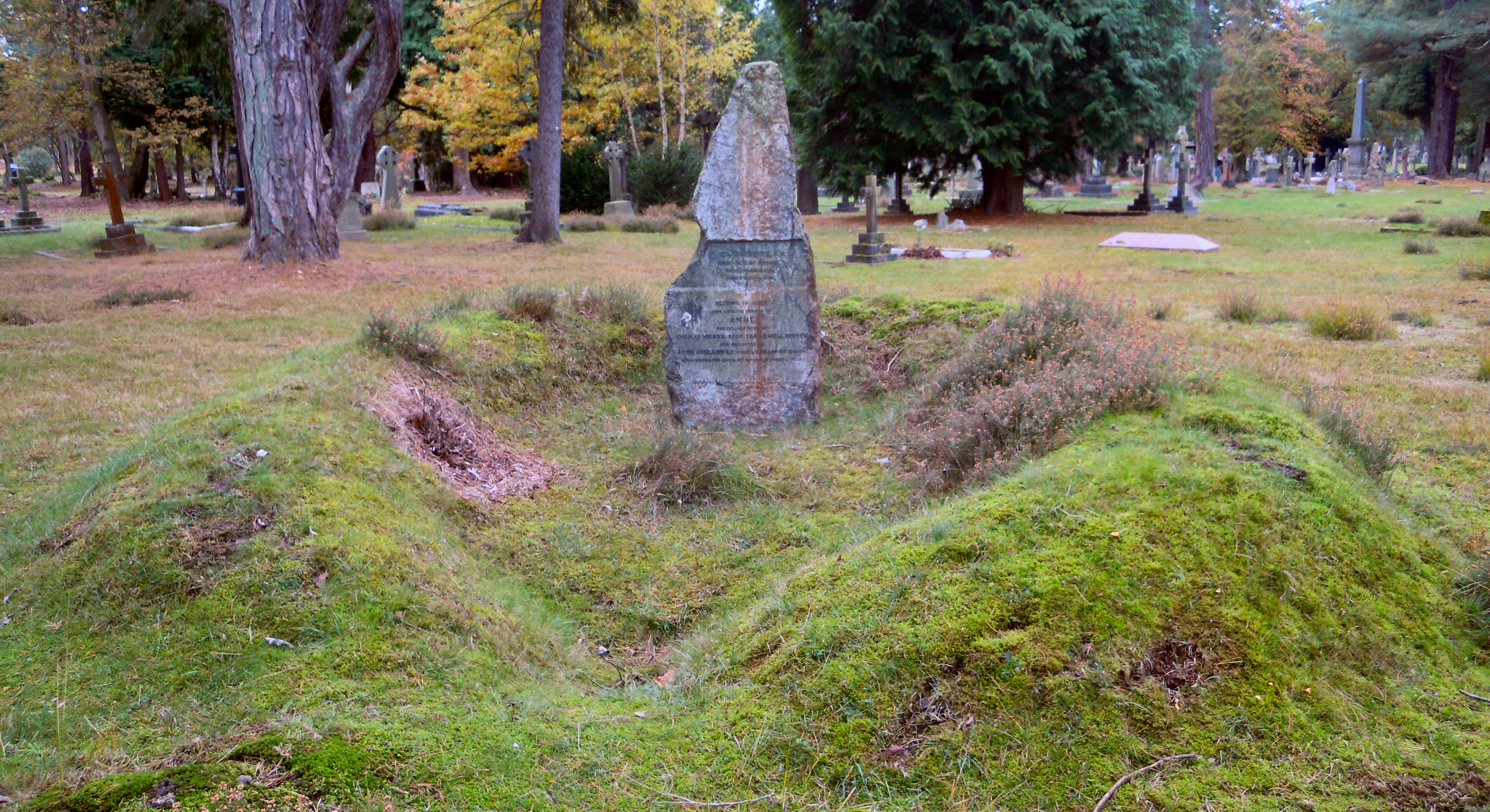
Grave of Charles Warne in Brookwood Cemetery

Charles Warne (1802 – 11 April 1887) was an English antiquarian and archaeologist who specialized in the prehistoric and ancient monuments of Dorset.

== Life ==
Born in Dorset, with the poet William Barnes he was involved in protecting the Maumbury Rings which resulted in their statutory protection from the route of the proposed Wilts, Somerset and Weymouth Railway Act 1845 (8 & 9 Vict. c. liii). This was the first time an antiquity was saved from being damaged by a proposed train route as a result of the actions of local protestors. He became a close friend of Charles Roach Smith and in 1853 and 1854 he made archaeological tours in France with Smith and Frederick William Fairholt.

Warne published accounts of his archaeological discoveries between 1836 and 1872 many of which were based on his own research and fieldwork. Elected as a Fellow of the Society of Antiquaries of London in 1856, Warne was then and for some time afterwards a resident of London. He made researches into the prehistoric remains of Dorset. Then for a long time he lived at Ewell, Surrey; the last years of his life were spent at Brighton, where he died on 11 April 1887.

== Legacy ==
During his lifetime Warne amassed a large collection of English and Roman coins part of which was sold by Messrs. Sotheby, Wilkinson, & Hodge, on 24 and 25 May 1889, two years after his death. Warne's collection of sepulchral urns and other relics from barrows went to Dorchester Museum.

His grave in Brookwood Cemetery (Plot 30) is designed to resemble a prehistoric barrow with the upright stone being made from serpentinite.

== Works ==
Warne's works were:

- On the Discovery of Roman Remains on Kingston Down, near Bere Regis, Dorset; and the Identification of the Site as the Station of Ibernium on the Icknield Street, London, 1836.
- An Illustrated Map of Dorsetshire, giving the sites of its numerous Celtic, Roman, Saxon, and Danish Vestiges [1865]. He spent two years walking the county in the company of George Hillier to prepare it.
- Dorsetshire: its Vestiges, Celtic, Roman, Saxon, and Danish, London. This work also served as an index to the map.
- The Celtic Tumuli of Dorset, London, 1866.
- On certain Ditches in Dorset called Belgic, London, 1869, reprinted from the Proceedings of the Society of Antiquaries.
- Ancient Dorset: the Celtic, Roman, Saxon, and Danish Antiquities of the County, including the Early Coinage, Bournemouth, 1872.

Warne also contributed "Observations on Vespasian's first Campaign in Britain" to Archæologia (xl. 387), and "Archæological Notes made during a Tour in France" to Charles Roach Smith's Retrospections (vol. ii. 1886).
