= Hill Township =

Hill Township may refer to:

== Arkansas ==
- Hill Township, Independence County, Arkansas, in Independence County, Arkansas
- Hill Township, Pulaski County, Arkansas, in Pulaski County, Arkansas

== Michigan ==
- Hill Township, Michigan

== Minnesota ==
- Hill Township, Kittson County, Minnesota

== Missouri ==
- Hill Township, Carroll County, Missouri

== Nebraska ==
- Hill Township, Knox County, Nebraska

== North Dakota ==
- Hill Township, Cass County, North Dakota, in Cass County, North Dakota
