= Ernest Hillier Chocolates =

Australian chocolate manufacturer

Coordinates: 37°43′40.7″S 144°57′21.72″E

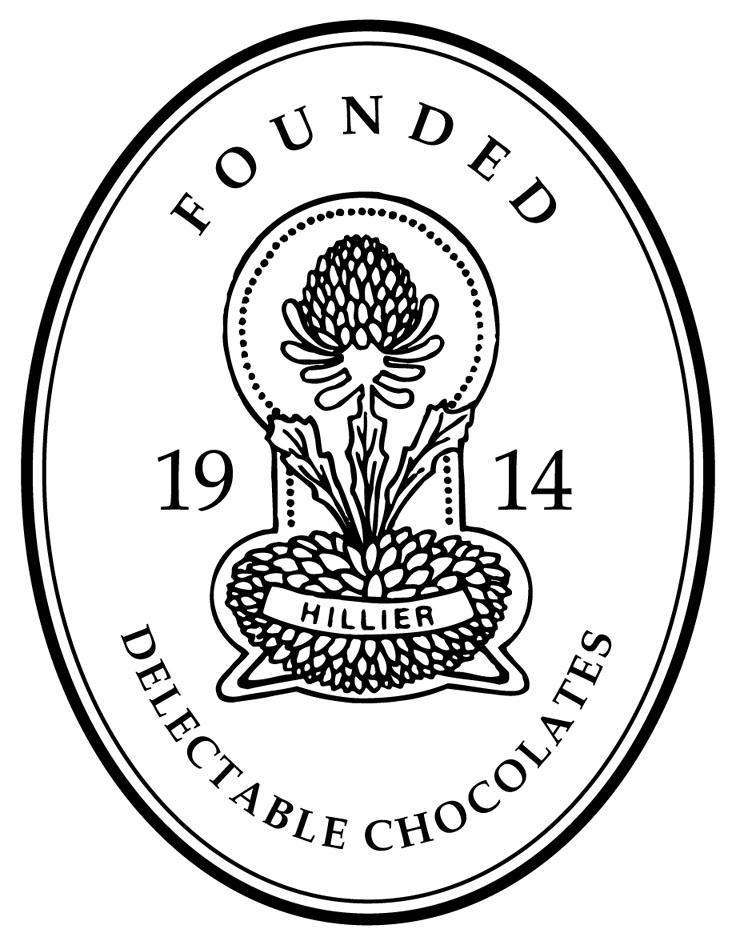
- Type: Privately held company
- Industry: Confectionery
- Founded: 1914
- Headquarters: 9-11 Hocking Street; Coburg North, Victoria, Australia
- Area served: Australia, international exports
- Products: Chocolates
- Number of employees: Around 60
- Website: ernesthillier.com.au

Ernest Hillier Chocolates is an Australian chocolatier. Founded in 1914, it is Australia's first chocolate manufacturer, and its oldest privately owned chocolatier is still in operation.

The company is headquartered in Melbourne, and produces over 600 chocolate products.

== History ==
Ernest Hillier moved from England to San Francisco, California, United States, in the early 1900s to learn the confectionery and soda trade. There, he and his Australian-born wife, Magdalen May, opened several restaurants; however, the majority of their establishments were destroyed in the 1906 San Francisco earthquake.

The Hilliers subsequently moved to Sydney, Australia, in 1906, where Hillier began a sequence of Australian firsts. In 1911, he opened the first soda fountain in Australia, "Hillier Refreshment Services", at the Imperial Skating Rink.

Because of the success of the soda fountain, Hillier was put in charge of catering at the amusement park at Rushcutters Bay, Sydney. That same year he also looked after Gaut's refreshment service and a fountain shop in George Street, opposite the Central railway station.

In 1914, Hillier opened his chocolatier business, providing locally made chocolate. Prior to this, all chocolate in Australia had to be imported from the U.S. and Europe. Because of the distance and climatic conditions, together with transport restrictions, the chocolate always arrived in poor condition.

In the wake of the Great Depression, chocolate sales dramatically declined in Sydney; in response, Hillier moved his business to Melbourne.

Hillier sold the business later in life.

In October 2000, Hillier purchased Australian confectionery company Newman's.

== Financial problems ==
Suffering financial distress, Hillier was sold to Re:Capital in 2014. The firm were unable to turn the chocolatier around and placed it in to voluntary administration in January 2015, citing rising cocoa prices and increased competition.

Hillier emerged from administration in mid-2015 and as of March 2016, was still producing chocolates from its Coburg North factory.

In June 2023, the company appointed administrators and stood down their Melbourne manufacturing site. This was due to increasing raw material costs and shipping costs impacting profit margins. The Yowie Group bought out their assets in August that year.

== See also ==
- List of chocolate brands
- List of chocolate flavored foods
