= Judith Hillier =

British physicist

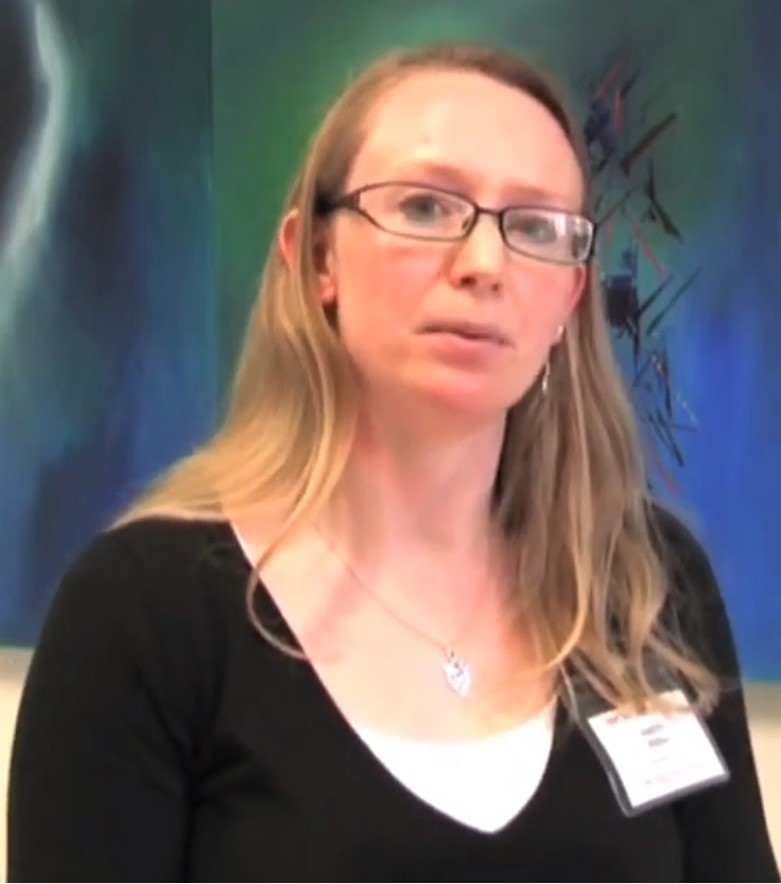
- Hillier in a video by the Institute of Physics in 2011
- Born: Judith Mary Preston
- Education: University of St Andrews; University of Leeds; University of Oxford
- Children: 2
- Awards: Marie Curie-Sklodowska Medal (2021)
- Scientific career
- Fields: Science education Physics education Chemistry education
- Workplaces: University of Oxford
- Thesis: A study of spin-glass-like systems using neutron polarisation analysis (2002)
- Website: www.education.ox.ac.uk/people/judith-hillier/

Judith Mary Hillier (née Preston) is a British physicist who is associate professor of science education at the University of Oxford. She is a lead tutor for the Postgraduate Certificate in Education programme in science and serves as vice president of Kellogg College, Oxford. She was awarded the Marie Curie-Sklodowska medal by the Institute of Physics in 2021 for her support of women in physics.

== Early life and education ==
Hillier studied physics and astronomy at the University of St Andrews, graduating with a Master of Science (MSci) degree. She moved to the University of Leeds for graduate studies, where her PhD research investigated condensed matter physics with experimental work conducted at the Institut Laue–Langevin. After a career break, Hillier joined the University of Oxford where she retrained as a secondary school teacher and was awarded a Postgraduate Certificate in Education (PGCE).

== Research and career ==
Hillier taught physics at a comprehensive school in Oxford, where she was appointed a coordinator of the Key Stage 3 curriculum. She eventually returned to academia, focussing on the teachers, recruitment and retention of physics teachers at the University of Oxford. She was appointed an associate professor of science education and Fellow of Kellogg College, Oxford in 2010. She founded the Oxfordshire Schools Physics Partnership, which supports physics teachers. In particular, Hillier investigated professional development activities and classroom explanations.

Hillier has been involved with the Institute of Physics throughout her career. In particular, she has concentrated on gender and diversity within the physics community. Hillier has been responsible for the evaluation of the Conference for Undergraduate Women in Physics (CUWiP) since it launched in the United Kingdom in 2015. She found that women felt a stronger sense of belonging to the physics community after attending the conference. Her evaluation is used to inform the design of future conferences, and ensured that the conference remains a key date in UK physics' calendar. To identify obstacles and solutions to gender imbalances within the scientific community, Hillier has studied the experiences of successful women scientists.

=== Selected publications ===
- Hillier, Judith; de Winter, James; Twidle, John (2013). "I Could Enjoy Teaching: The Case of Physics". Canadian Journal of Science, Mathematics and Technology Education. 13 (3): 287–302. Bibcode:2013CJSMT..13..287H. doi:10.1080/14926156.2013.816392. ISSN 1492-6156. S2CID 120291909.
- Bryant, Peter; Nunes, Terezinha; Hillier, Judith; Gilroy, Claire; Barros, Rossana (4 December 2013). "The Importance of being able to deal with variables in learning science". International Journal of Science and Mathematics Education. 13 (S1): 145–163. doi:10.1007/s10763-013-9469-x. ISSN 1571-0068. S2CID 145233104.
- Miller-Friedmann, Jaimie; Childs, Ann; Hillier, Judith (2018). "Approaching gender equity in academic chemistry: lessons learned from successful female chemists in the UK". Chemistry Education Research and Practice. 19 (19): 24–41. doi:10.1039/C6RP00252H. OCLC 1051382133.
- Hillier, J.; Ioannidou, O. (2021). "Using practical work: strategies to avoid closing down practice". Science Teacher Education. 89 (3).

== Awards and honours ==
Hillier was awarded the Marie Curie-Sklodowska medal by the Institute of Physics in 2021 for her support of women in physics.
