= Hilly =

Hilly may refer to:

- a place with hills
- a place with hill country

== People ==
=== Surname ===
- Francis Billy Hilly (born 1948), Solomon Islands politician
- Jed Hilly, American musician
- Pat Hilly (1887–1953), American baseball player

=== Given name ===
- Hilly Bardwell, wife of Alastair Boyd, 7th Baron Kilmarnock
- Hilly Elkins (1929–2010), American producer
- Hilly Flitcraft (1923–2003), American baseball player
- Hilly Hathaway (born 1969), American baseball player
- Hilly Hicks Sr. (born 1950), American actor
- Hilly Hicks Jr. (born 1970), American playwright and screenwriter
- Hilly Kristal (1931–2007), American musician and club owner
- Hilly Michaels, American musician
- Hilly Rose, American radio personality

== Other uses ==
- Hilly Creek, a creek in Halifax County, Virginia, U.S.

== See also ==
- Hillier (disambiguation)
- Hillies (disambiguation)
- Hillyer (disambiguation)
- Hillyfields (disambiguation), including Hilly Field(s)
- Hill (disambiguation)
