= Hill City =

Hill City may refer to:

United States

- Hill City, Georgia
- Hill City, Idaho
- Hill City, Kansas
- Hill City, Minnesota
- Hill City, South Dakota
- Lynchburg, Virginia, nicknamed Hill City

Malaysia

- Ipoh, nicknamed Hill City

Other uses

- Hill City (fashion), a subsidiary fashion label of Gap Inc.
