= Lisa Rohan =

American chemist

Lisa Cencia Rohan is an American chemist and pharmaceutical scientist.

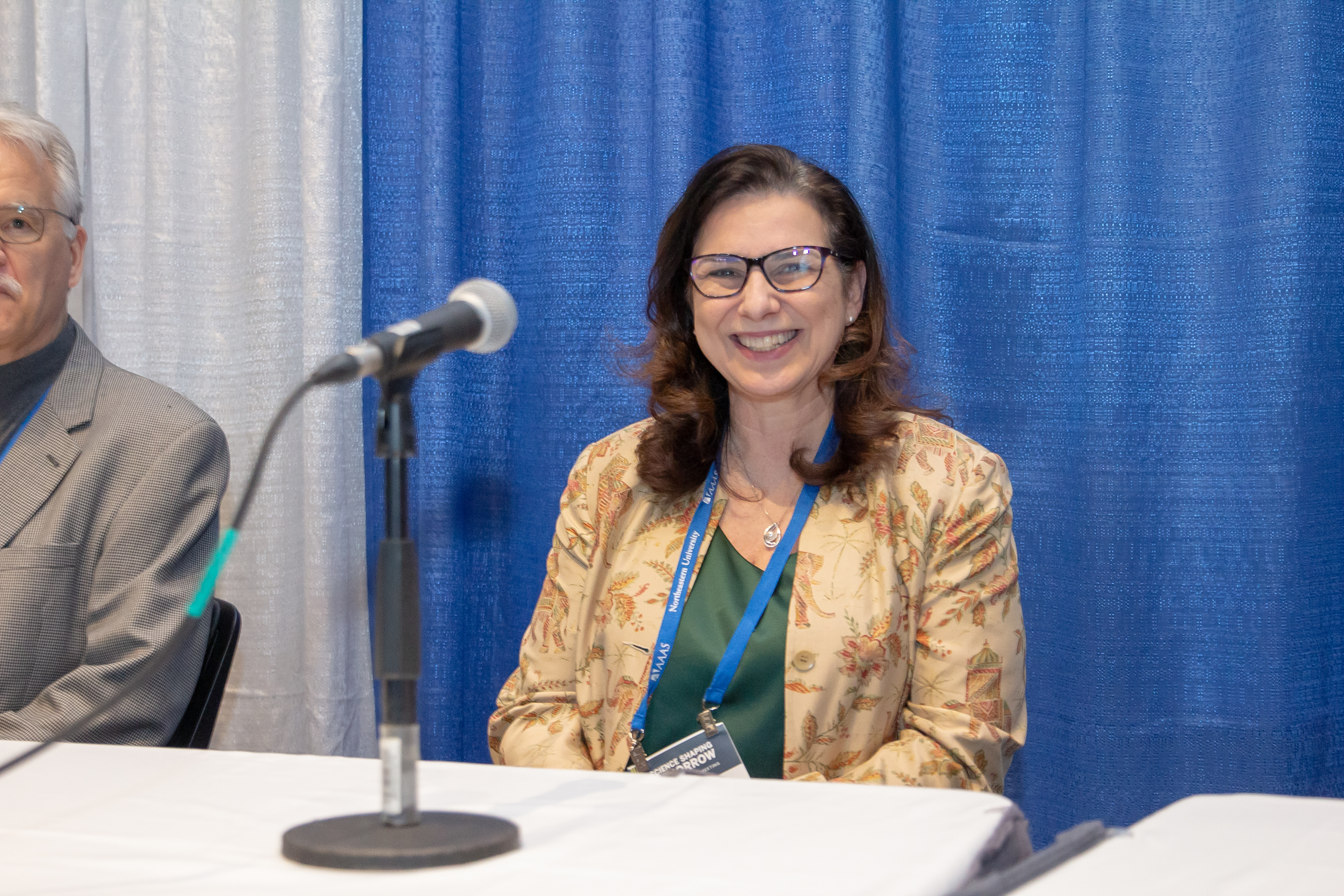
Rohan in 2025

== Biography ==
She obtained a Bachelor of Science in chemical engineering from West Virginia University and a Ph.D. in pharmaceutics from the University of Pittsburgh, School of Pharmacy. She completed a postdoctoral fellowship in the department of obstetrics, gynecology, and reproductive sciences in the area of mucosal immunology at the University of Pittsburgh. So far, Rohan has 169 publications with over 3,000 citations. Prior to her academic career, Rohan held leadership positions in the pharmaceutical industry.

Rohan currently serves on the faculty as a professor in the department of pharmaceutical sciences in the school of pharmacy. She also holds appointments in the Department of Obstetrics, Gynecology, and Reproductive Sciences in the School of Medicine and the Clinical Translational Science Institute at the University of Pittsburgh. Additionally, she is an Investigator at the Magee Womens Research Institute.

Rohan serves as co-principal investigator for the Microbicide Trials Network Laboratory, an HIV/AIDS clinical trials network established by the National Institute of Allergy and Infectious Diseases (NIAID), part of the U.S. National Institutes of Health (NIH). The primary focus of the research in the lab is centered on the design of drug delivery systems for application in the areas of infectious disease, irritable bowel syndrome, and gynecologic oncology. A recent on-going development involves the development of a drug delivery system for the prevention of COVID-19. This work done by her and her research team, fighting the COVID-19 pandemic, was covered by the Pittsburgh Business Times, the Pittsburgh's Action News 4 (WTAE), and other local media.

On May 25, 2022, Prof. Lisa Rohan was recognized by the Pittsburgh Business Times as a Women of Influence 2022 honoree.
