= Frontiers: A Journal of Women Studies =

Academic journal

- Discipline: Women's studies
- Language: English
- Edited by: Wanda S. Pillow; Darius Bost; Debjani Chakravarty

Publication details
- History: 1975–present
- Publisher: University of Utah via University of Nebraska Press (United States)
- Frequency: Triannual
- Impact factor: 0.214 (2015)

Standard abbreviations
- ISO 4: Front. J. Women Stud.

Indexing
- ISSN: 0160-9009 (print); 1536-0334 (web)
- LCCN: 76647397
- JSTOR: 01609009
- OCLC no.: 46770686

Links
- Journal homepage; Online archive; Journal page at Project MUSE

Frontiers: A Journal of Women Studies is a triannual peer-reviewed academic journal that figures among the earliest publications in the field of feminist and gender studies in the United States. First published in 1975, at the University of Colorado, Boulder, Frontiers tries to present an extensive, interdisciplinary agenda concerned with the intersections of the different systems of oppression that produce and reproduce social inequalities and injustices.

From 2012 through spring 2017, the journal was edited at Ohio State University, with Guisela Latorre and Judy Tzu-Chun Wu serving as editors-in-chief. As of July 2017, the journal's editorial team is based at the University of Utah's new School for Cultural and Social Transformation, and the editors are Wanda S. Pillow, Kimberly M. Jew, and Cindy Cruz. The aim of the publication is to promote the works of feminist thinkers and theorists.

== Abstracting and indexing ==
The journal is abstracted and indexed in Social Sciences Citation Index and Current Contents/Social & Behavioral Sciences. According to the Journal Citation Reports, the journal has a 2015 impact factor of 0.214, ranking it 37th out of 40 journals in the category "Women's Studies".

== See also ==
- List of women's studies journals
- Feminist Review
- Feminist Studies
- Signs: Journal of Women in Culture and Society
