= Hillier Nurseries =

Horticultural business in the UK

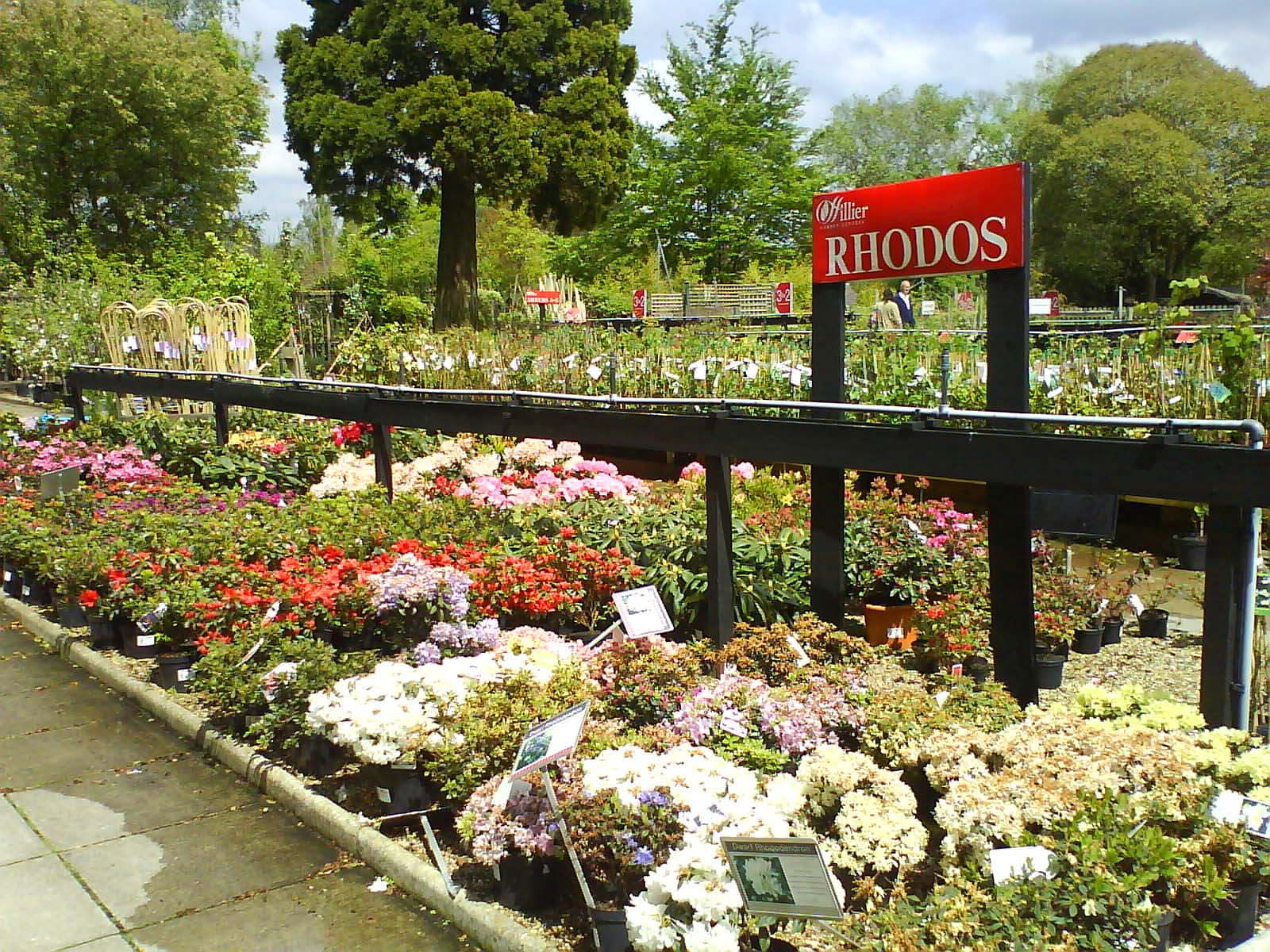
Hilliers Garden Centre in Winchester

Hillier Nurseries is a British horticultural and garden centre company based in Romsey, Hampshire.

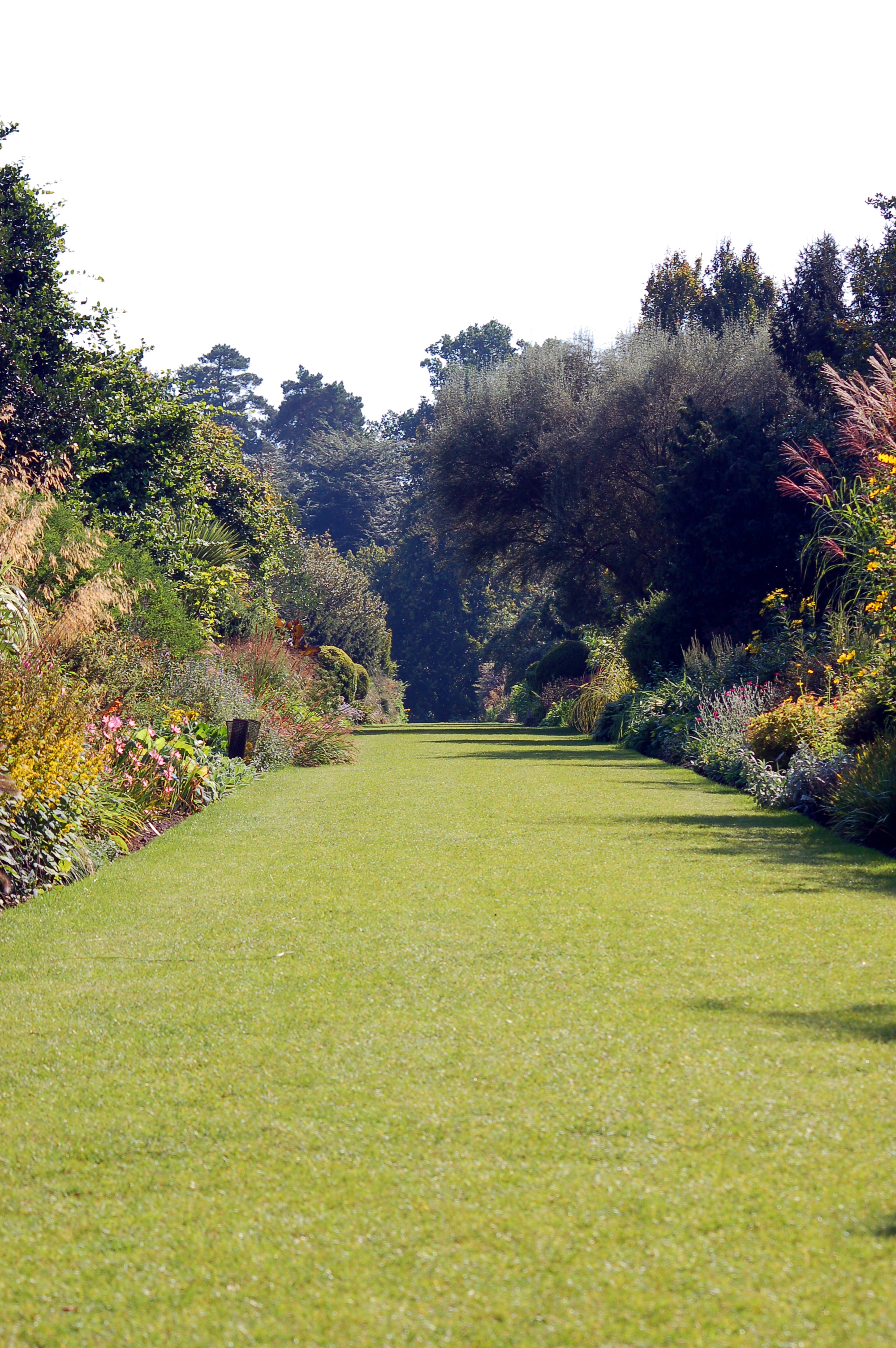
The border created by Sir Harold Hillier in 1964 to celebrate the centenary of the founding of the business.

It was founded by Edwin Hillier in 1864 in Winchester as a florist and plant nursery. Family member and chairman Sir Harold Hillier became Vice-President of the Royal Horticultural Society in 1974. As of 2026 it continues to be owned by the Hillier family.

The Sir Harold Hillier Gardens in Romsey were donated by Sir Harold Hillier to Hampshire County Council in 1977 for the public to be able to visit.
