= Hill County =

Hill County is the name of two counties in the United States:

- Hill County, Montana
- Hill County, Texas
