= Hillfield Park =

Park in Monkspath, Solihull, England

- Interactive map of Hillfield Park
- Type: Park
- Location: Monkspath, Solihull, West Midlands
- Coordinates: 52.3954536°N 1.792531°W
- Area: 2 acres (0.81 ha)
- Created: 1984
- Operator: Metropolitan Borough of Solihull
- Visitors: over 100 a day
- Status: Open
- Website: www.solihull.gov.uk/parks/hillfieldpark.htm

Hillfield Park, Solihull, West Midlands is a community open space and play park in Monkspath, Solihull. It covers an area of over 2 acres (0.81 ha) and includes an attractive lake surrounded by formal footpaths, which give walkers the opportunity to explore the open space. It is built on a landfill site, its contours being produced by the earth settling as gases escape.

== History ==
The park was opened in 1984 to help meet the recreation needs of people in the local area.

In late 2009 a new children's playground was built. Refurbished as part of year 2 Playbuilder project, the project created Embankment slides, Activity trail, Wobble board, V Bridge, Junior swings, Toddler swings, Suspension bridge, Roller balance beam, Stepping logs, Junior multi play, Chain walk, Zip Slide. Climbing boulders and natural play features including willow arch and sensory planting.

In July 2021 an armed forces community garden was installed in close adjacency to the lake. The official opening event was postponed until covid restrictions were lifted, taking place on Friday 20 May 2022.

== Wildlife ==
The park is home to a wide variety of bird life including swallows, swifts, herons, peregrine falcons and buzzards.

== Facilities ==
3 car parks, Lake, River and/or Stream, Recreational area, Play Area, and Football Pitches
