= Thomas Tidy =

English cricketer

Thomas Tidy (9 February 1846 – 26 February 1892) (Note: CricInfo provides different birth and death dates for Tidy, having him living between 1847 and 1918. The details given in Carlaw suggest that these are in error.) was an English cricketer who played in one first-class cricket match for Kent County Cricket Club in 1868.

Tidy was probably born at Southborough in Kent in 1846, (Note: CricInfo has Tidy born at Hurstpierpoint in Sussex.) the son of Thomas and Jane Tidy. His father was the village blacksmith, a profession which Thomas and two of his brothers went in to. There is some doubt about his identity, but it is considered probably that this is the Thomas Tidy who made his only first-class appearance against the Gentlemen of the MCC during the 1868 Canterbury Cricket Week. He is known to have played in minor matches for Southborough, Kent Colts and Sussex Colts and possibly also in the Gravesend area.

Tidy married Mary Mann, a widow, at East Grinstead in 1877, the daughter of a family of inn keepers from Tunbridge Wells. By 1891 the couple were living at Brighton with Mary running The Eastern Hotel in the town. Tidy drowned in 1892 at Aldrington near Brighton with the circumstances of his death unknown. (Note: CricInfo has Tidy dying at Hildenborough in Kent in 1918 at age 70.)

== Bibliography ==
- Carlaw, Derek (2020). Kent County Cricketers, A to Z: Part One (1806–1914) (PDF). Cardiff: ACS.
