= Orictites =

Scientific classification
- Domain: Eukaryota
- Kingdom: Animalia
- Phylum: Arthropoda
- Class: Insecta
- Order: Coleoptera
- Suborder: Adephaga
- Family: Carabidae
- Tribe: Clivinini
- Genus: Orictites; Andrewes, 1931

Genus of beetles

Orictites is a genus of beetles in the family Carabidae, containing the following species:

- Orictites ampliosetosus Balkenohl, 2017
- Orictites anteriorlatus Balkenohl, 2017
- Orictites anteriortenuis Balkenohl, 2017
- Orictites barclayi Balkenohl, 2017
- Orictites brancuccii Balkenohl, 2017
- Orictites charleshuberi Balkenohl, 2017
- Orictites costulipennis (H. W. Bates, 1892)
- Orictites desuntsetosus Balkenohl, 2017
- Orictites minotaur Andrewes, 1931
- Orictites mjoebergi Louwerens, 1964
- Orictites omnipunctatus Balkenohl, 2017
- Orictites orbachi Bulirsch & Magrini, 2022
- Orictites plurisetosus Balkenohl, 2017
- Orictites tubercucollis Balkenohl, 2017
