= George Hillier =

English antiquarian (1815–1866)

George Alexander Hillier (1815–1866) was an English antiquarian.

== Life ==
The eldest son of William Hillier, commander R.N., he was born at Kennington, and was educated at Place Street House, near Ryde, Isle of Wight. A bookseller and printer, he was declared bankrupt in July 1839.

In the later 1840s Hillier was undertaking antiquarian and family history researches, with access to the British Museum. In 1853 he was acting as a dealer in manuscripts, which he sold to the museum; then shortly the provenance and authenticity of the manuscripts came under suspicion. Frederic Madden broke off the relationship, but the potential scandal was hushed up. In this "Hillier affair", the evidence points to Hillier's having obtained access to Madden through his assistant Richard Sims, with genuine manuscripts from Mostyn Hall and Bridgewater House, Runcorn to sell, as Madden's investigation with John Payne Collier (much later shown to be a forger) quickly concluded.

The discovery of the Anglo-Saxon cemetery at Chessell Down in the Isle of Wight, and the excavation of the graves, was Hillier's significant contribution to archæology. Once more his good faith came into question, however, when artefacts for which he had agreed a sale with Lord Londesborough went to a pawnbroker.

Hillier died at Ryde on 1 April 1866, and was buried at Binstead.

== Works ==
Hillier's works included:

- The Topography of the Isle of Wight. To which is appended, a Voyage round the Island, Ryde, 1850.
- A Voyage Round the Isle of Wight, 1850.
- A Day at Arundel; comprising the antiquities of the Castle, ecclesiastical associations, and neighbouring beauties, 1851 (2nd edition)
- A Narrative of the attempted Escapes of Charles the First from Carisbrook Castle, and of his detention in the Isle of Wight. Including the letters of the King to Colonel Titus, now first deciphered and printed from the originals, London 1852.
- The Sieges of Arundel Castle, by Sir Ralph Hopton and Sir William Waller, London 1854.
- Result of the Excavations on Brighstone and Bowcombe Downs, Isle of Wight, August 1854, 1854.
- A Memorial of the Castle of Carisbrook, London 1855.
- The Stranger's Guide to the town of Reading, with a History of the Abbey, Reading, 1859.

A long-term project, a History and Antiquities of the Isle of Wight, was left incomplete. Hillier was also employed in illustrating Charles Warne's Dorsetshire, and travelled with the author to prepare the map.

== Notes ==
Attribution

This article incorporates text from a publication now in the public domain: Stephen, Leslie; Lee, Sidney, eds. (1891). "Hillier, George". Dictionary of National Biography. Vol. 26. London: Smith, Elder & Co.
