= Louis Hillier (botanist) =

French bryologist and botanist

- Born: Louis Édouard Joseph Hillier; 9 February 1871; Besançon, France
- Died: 14 March 1962 (aged 91) idem
- Scientific career
- Fields: Botany; Bryology
- Author abbrev. (botany): Hillier

Louis Édouard Joseph Hillier (9 February 1871 (Note: Most sources erroneously state 1869 as the birth year), Besançon, France – 14 March 1962, idem) was a French bryologist and botanist.
