= Louis Hillier (musician) =

Belgian musician and composer

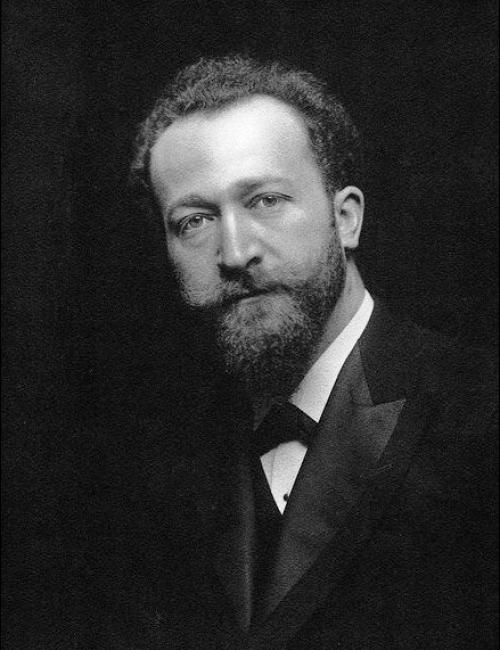
Louis Hillier

Louis Hillier (1868–1960) was a Belgian musician and composer of Wallonia, who in 1901 wrote the music of the Le Chant des Wallons, the Walloon anthem.

Among his many other compositions, he was commissioned by The General Electric Company, Ltd. (GEC of the UK, not GE of the USA) to write a company March which was performed at their 1904 Annual Dinner. It incorporated a musical part written for electric bells, still a new technology at the time.
