= Harold Hillier =

British horticulturist

Sir Harold Hillier CBE VMH
- Born: Harold George Hillier; 2 January 1905
- Died: 8 January 1985 (aged 80)
- Occupation: Horticulturist

Sir Harold George Hillier CBE VMH (2 January 1905 – 8 January 1985) was an English horticulturist.

In 1921, he joined the family firm, Hillier Nurseries, his early career spent in assisting his father in rebuilding stocks depleted by World War I. He became partner in 1930 and head of the firm on his father's death in 1944, leading the nursery's expansion to become the leading British stockist of northern temperate trees and shrubs.

From the 1950s onward he expanded his interest to gathering seeds and plants from the US and worldwide, donating many endangered plants to collections such as Ventnor Botanic Garden, Wisley Gardens and Westonbirt Arboretum. His own collection, the Hillier arboretum, at Ampfield near Romsey, was presented as a gift to Hampshire County Council in 1977.

Despite his distinguished work, he documented little of it, and his main published work was Hillier's Manual of Trees and Shrubs (1972).

In 1972, he was made an honorary fellow of the Royal Horticultural Society, becoming vice-president in 1974. In 1954, he was elected a fellow of the Linnean Society of London and in 1957 was awarded the Victoria Medal of Honour from the Royal Horticultural Society.

Hillier was appointed a Commander of the Order of the British Empire (CBE) in the 1971 Birthday Honours for services to horticulture, and knighted in the 1983 New Year Honours for services to horticulture and for charitable services.
