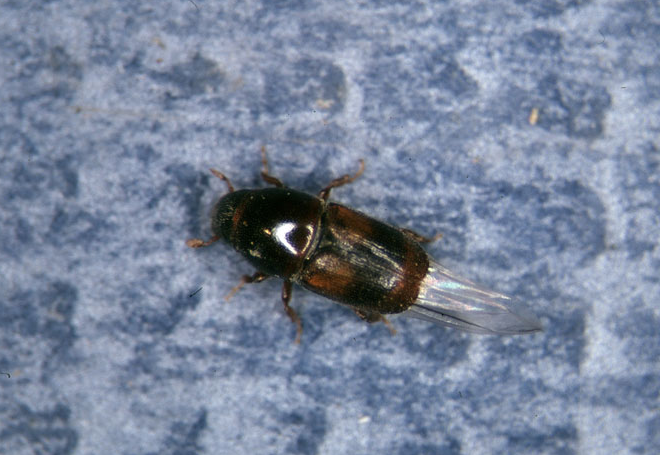

Scientific classification
- Domain: Eukaryota
- Kingdom: Animalia
- Phylum: Arthropoda
- Class: Insecta
- Order: Coleoptera
- Suborder: Polyphaga
- Infraorder: Cucujiformia
- Family: Curculionidae
- Genus: Scolytus
- Species: S. schevyrewi

Binomial name
- Scolytus schevyrewi (Semenov-Tian-Shanskij, 1902)

Synonyms
- Scolytus schevyrevi Semenov-Tian-Shanskij, 1902; Scolytus seulensis Murayama, 1930; Scolytus sinensis Eggers, 1910; Scolytus laevifrons Michalski, 1964; Eccoptogaster emarginatus Wichmann 1915; Eccoptogaster frankei Wichmann, 1915; Eccoptogaster transcaspicus Eggers, 1922

= Scolytus schevyrewi =

Species of beetle

Scolytus schevyrewi, the banded elm bark beetle, is a 3–4 mm long elm bark beetle species in the genus Scolytus native from Asia and accidentally introduced to North America. It is a vector of the Dutch elm disease, caused by the Ascomycota Ophiostoma ulmi and Ophiostoma novo-ulmi. In North America, it is displacing both the native elm bark beetle and the previously introduced smaller European elm bark beetle, which are becoming less common in their range with the expansion of S. schevyrewi.
