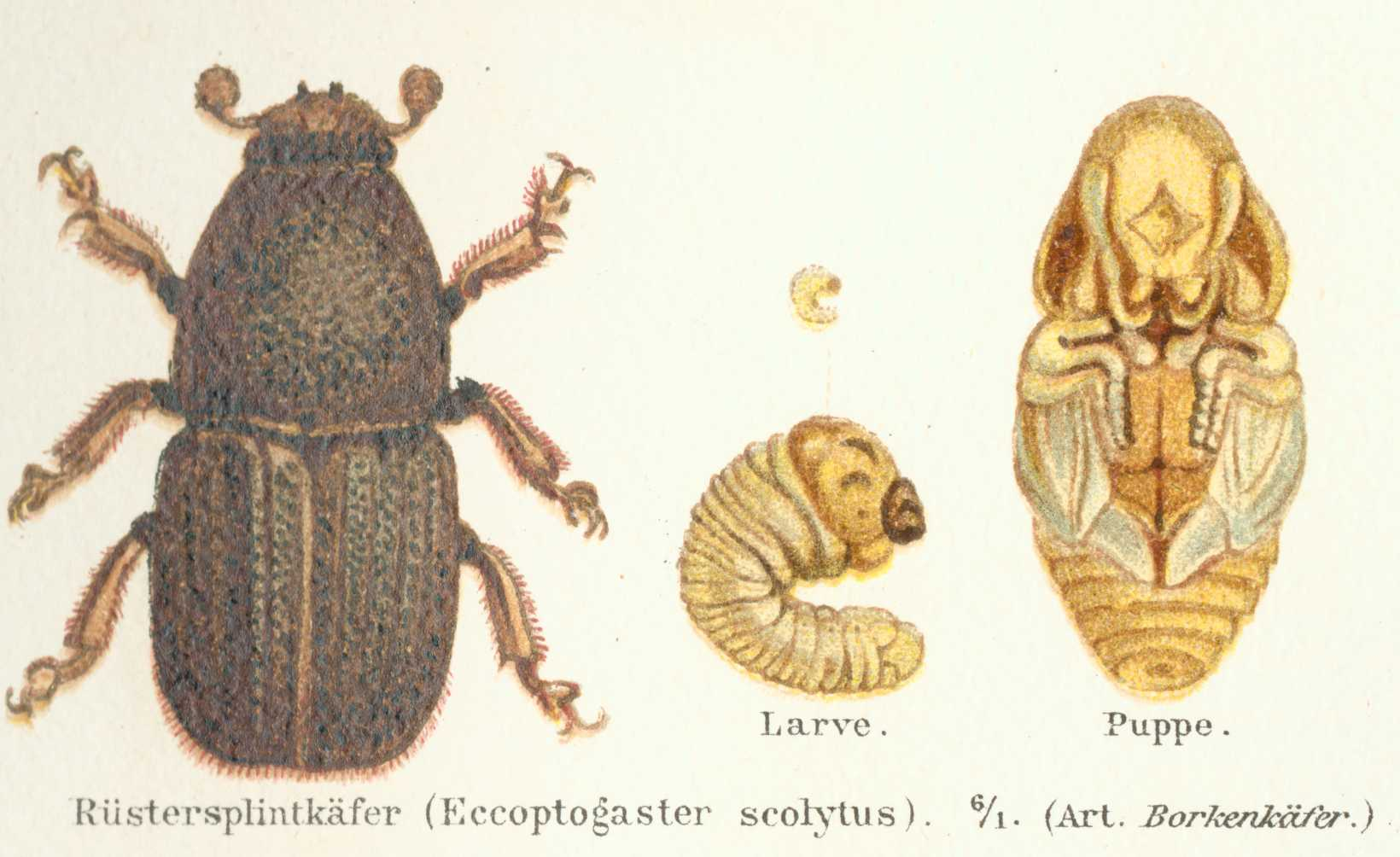
- Scolytus scolytus

Scientific classification
- Kingdom: Animalia
- Phylum: Arthropoda
- Clade: Pancrustacea
- Class: Insecta
- Order: Coleoptera
- Suborder: Polyphaga
- Infraorder: Cucujiformia
- Superfamily: Curculionoidea
- Family: Curculionidae
- Subfamily: Scolytinae
- Tribe: Scolytini
- Genus: Scolytus; Geoffroy, 1762

Species
- See text

= Scolytus =

Genus of beetles

Scolytus is a genus of bark beetles (subfamily Scolytinae). It includes several species notorious for destroying trees in the forests. The Dutch elm disease is spread in North America by two species : the native elm bark beetle, Hylurgopinus rufipes, and the European elm bark beetle, Scolytus multistriatus. In Europe, while the aforementioned Scolytus multistriatus again acts as vector for infection, it is much less effective than the large elm bark beetle Scolytus scolytus.

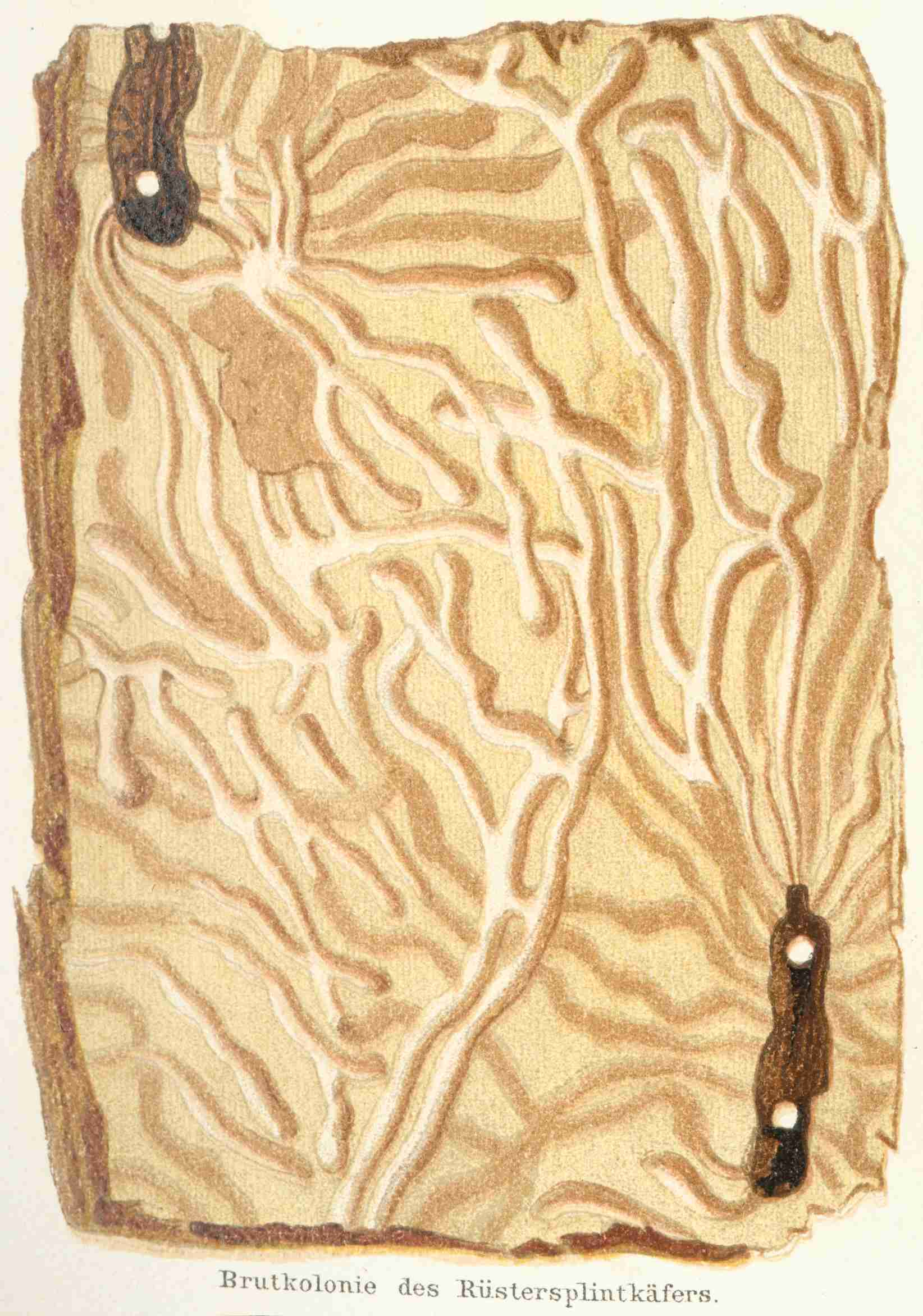
Scolytus scolytus

== Species ==
Species include:

- Scolytus amygdali Guerin, 1847, the almond bark beetle
- Scolytus dentatus Bright, 1964
- Scolytus fagi Walsh, 1867
- Scolytus jacobsoni Spessivtzev, 1919
- Scolytus laricis Blackman, 1934, the larch engraver
- Scolytus mali (Bechstein, 1805), the larger shothole borer
- Scolytus monticolae Swaine, 1917
- Scolytus multistriatus (Marsham, 1802), the European elm bark beetle, smaller European elm bark beetle
- Scolytus muticus Say, 1824, the hackberry beetle
- Scolytus obelus Wood, 1962
- Scolytus opacus Blackman, 1934
- Scolytus oregoni Blackman, 1934
- Scolytus praeceps Le Conte, 1876
- Scolytus quadrispinosus Say, 1824, the hickory bark beetle
- Scolytus reflexus Blackman, 1934
- Scolytus robustus Blackman, 1934
- Scolytus rugulosus (Müller, 1818), the shothole borer
- Scolytus schevyrewi Semenov, 1902, the banded elm bark beetle
- Scolytus scolytus (Fabricius, 1775), larger European elm bark beetle
- Scolytus subscaber Le Conte, 1876
- Scolytus unispinosus Le Conte, 1876, the Douglas-fir engraver
- Scolytus ventralis Le Conte, 1868, the fir engraver
