= Multistriatin =

Names
- IUPAC name 5-ethyl-2,4-dimethyl-6,8-dioxabicyclo[3.2.1]octane
- Other names (1S,2R,4S,5R)-5-ethyl-2,4-dimethyl-6,8-dioxabicyclo[3.2.1]octane

Identifiers
CAS Number	59014-03-8
3D model (JSmol)	Interactive image
ChemSpider	474468
PubChem CID	13199930
UNII	CCJ8A99MHA
- InChI: InChI=1S/C10H18O2/c1-4-10-8(3)5-7(2)9(12-10)6-11-10/h7-9H,4-6H2,1-3H3/t7-,8+,9-,10-/m1/s1 Key: YMBRJMLOGNZRFY-UTINFBMNSA-N
- SMILES: CCC12C(CC(C(O1)CO2)C)C

Properties
Chemical formula	C_{10}H_{18}O_{2}
Molar mass	170.252 g·mol^{−1}
Density	0.959 g/mL
Boiling point	207.1 °C (404.8 °F; 480.2 K)

Hazards
Flash point	74.9 °C (166.8 °F; 348.0 K)
- Except where otherwise noted, data are given for materials in their standard state (at 25 °C [77 °F], 100 kPa). Infobox references

Multistriatin is a pheromone of the elm bark beetle. It is a volatile compound released by a virgin female beetle when she has found a good source of food, such as an elm tree.

== Potential applications ==
Males beetles, which carry the fungus which causes Dutch elm disease, are attracted to the pheromone. Hence multistriatin could be used to trap beetles and so prevent the spread of the disease.

== Stereochemistry ==
The compound exists in several diastereomic forms, depending on the positions of the methyl groups. Only the natural stereoisomer, α-multistriatin, attracts the elm bark beetles.

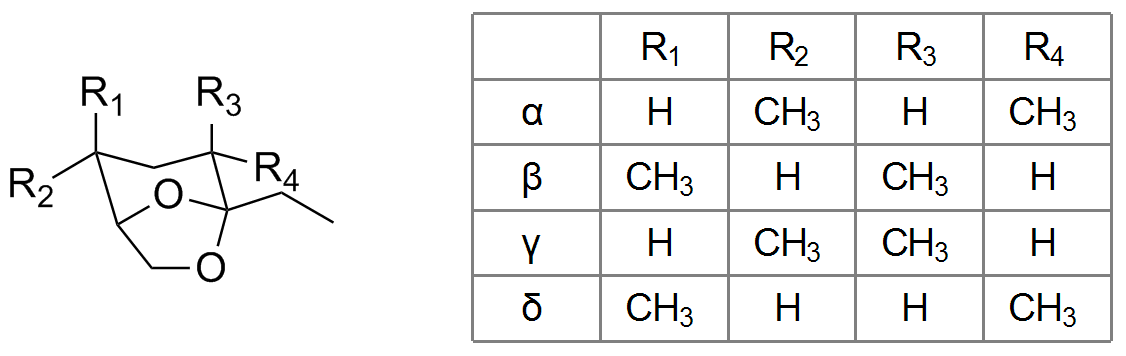
