= Scolytus jacobsoni =

Scientific classification
- Domain: Eukaryota
- Kingdom: Animalia
- Phylum: Arthropoda
- Class: Insecta
- Order: Coleoptera
- Suborder: Polyphaga
- Infraorder: Cucujiformia
- Family: Curculionidae
- Genus: Scolytus
- Species: S. jacobsoni

Binomial name
- Scolytus jacobsoni Wood & Bright, 1992

Species of beetle

Scolytus jacobsoni is an elm bark beetle occurring in forests of mixed broad-leaves with elm trees in Asia. In southeastern Russia, during years of outbreaks S. jacobsoni often attacks healthy trees along forest edges or standing alone along roads and in fields and gardens, making it an important pest for elm trees there. Reported hosts include Ulmus davidiana, Ulmus japonica, Ulmus laciniata, Ulmus propinqua, Carpinus betulus, and Pyrus ussuriensis.

== Description ==
Body length is 3–5 mm long. The general color is dark-brown and shining, with lighter legs, elytra and antennae. The forehead of males is depressed and red hair covers its edges, which are curled toward the middle of the forehead. Female forehead is convex, bearing a medium longitudinal groove. Longitudinal wrinkle near the mouth and vertex punctured in both sexes.

The pronotum is somewhat longer than wide (7:6 ratio). It is covered with coarse punctures that are larger at the edges, particularly at its anterior. The length of the elytra is almost equal to their combined width. The elytra have longitudinal grooves made of large round punctures. The spaces between these grooves contain rows of smaller punctures, which are irregular on the first two inter-groove spaces, but form regular single lines on the others.

The abdomen is covered with short reddish hairs, which are denser on the first two and the last segments. The abdomen of males is concave toward the rear, with a steep depression on the second abdominal sternite, and bearing a horizontally extended finger-shaped tubercle on the middle of the posterior edge of the second abdominal sternite. This structure distinguishes it from other Russian Scolytus species. Males also have bumps on the 3rd and 4th abdominal sternites, which females lack.

== Life cycle ==
The usual flight period is June–July in southeastern Russia. The female bores a vertical egg gallery (5–7 cm in length and up to 2.5 mm of diameter) below the bark of the trunk or thick branches of declining elms, either standing or fallen, including elms burned by grass fires, and also on healthy elms when beetle population is high or if the elms stand a short while away from the forest. Eggs are laid on the sides of this gallery on the inner surface of the bark. Long galleries contain about a hundred eggs. Upon hatching, larvae bore their own galleries perpendicularly from the egg galleries, close to one another, often touching adjacent larval galleries, but rarely intersecting. Larvae pupate in mid–July. Adults emerge in late July and early August. Soon after emerging, adults feed on thin young branches of elms, chew the thin bark and part of the sapwood, thus making grooves that run along or around these branches. There is usually a single generation per year. Sometimes there is a second generation, which flies in July–August, and lay eggs in mid–August. Their larvae develop in September, and reach near full larval maturity prior to the winter. Larvae overwinter. Several species of Chalcidoidea parasitoids use S. jacobsoni larvae as their host.

== Distribution ==
This species has been reported from southeastern Russia (Primorsky Krai province and Sakhalin island), northeastern China (Heilongjiang and Liaoning provinces), and Japan. The only North American report is with a single S. jacobsoni specimen caught in the wild in 2009 in the Vernon landfill in southern British Columbia, Canada, with a Lindgren funnel trap (multiple black funnels aligned vertically to mimic a tree trunk, with a collection vial at the base, to collect insects associated with trees) baited with a Scolytus multistriatus pheromones lure and an ultra high release ethanol lure. More traps were deployed in and around this area the following years but this species was never caught again.
