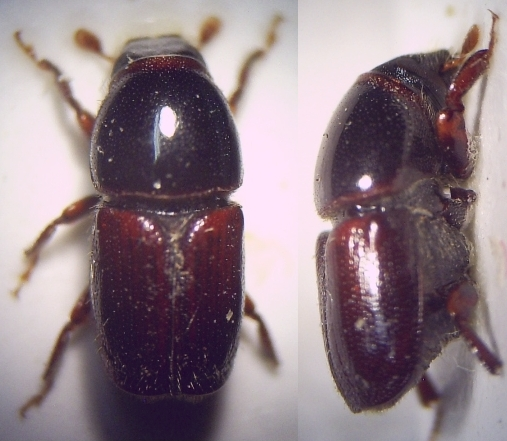

Scientific classification
- Kingdom: Animalia
- Phylum: Arthropoda
- Class: Insecta
- Order: Coleoptera
- Suborder: Polyphaga
- Infraorder: Cucujiformia
- Family: Curculionidae
- Tribe: Scolytini
- Genus: Scolytus
- Species: S. mali

Binomial name
- Scolytus mali (Bechstein, 1805)

= Scolytus mali =

Species of beetle

Scolytus mali, known generally as large fruit bark beetle, is a species of typical bark beetle in the family Curculionidae. Other common names include the apple bark beetle and large fruit bark beetle. It is native to Europe, and is an invasive species in North America.
