= Elm bark beetle =

Elm bark beetle is a common name for several insects and may refer to:

- Hylurgopinus rufipes, native to North America
- Scolytus multistriatus, native to Europe and introduced to North America
- Scolytus schevyrewi, native to Asia and introduced to North America
