= Maulsby Willett Blackman =

American entomologist

- Born: 1896
- Died: 1943 (aged 46–47)
- Education: Harvard University
- Scientific career
- Fields: Entomology
- Workplaces: New York State College of Forestry; United States Department of Agriculture

Maulsby Willett Blackman (1876–1943) was an American entomologist.

== Biography ==
Blackman was born in 1876. In 1905, he received the Ph.D. degree in entomology from Harvard University. Starting from 1907 to 1929, he was on the faculty of the New York State College of Forestry at Syracuse. He was appointed as senior entomologist in 1929 at the Bureau of Entomology, a branch of the United States Department of Agriculture. Blackman worked there until his death in 1943. His speciality was forest entomology, during which career he spent time researching the biology and taxonomy of Scolytidae.
