= Scolytus muticus =

Scientific classification
- Domain: Eukaryota
- Kingdom: Animalia
- Phylum: Arthropoda
- Class: Insecta
- Order: Coleoptera
- Suborder: Polyphaga
- Infraorder: Cucujiformia
- Family: Curculionidae
- Genus: Scolytus
- Species: S. muticus

Binomial name
- Scolytus muticus Say, 1824

Species of beetle

Scolytus muticus, known generally as the hackberry engraver or hackberry beetle, is a species of typical bark beetle in the family Curculionidae. It is found in North America.
