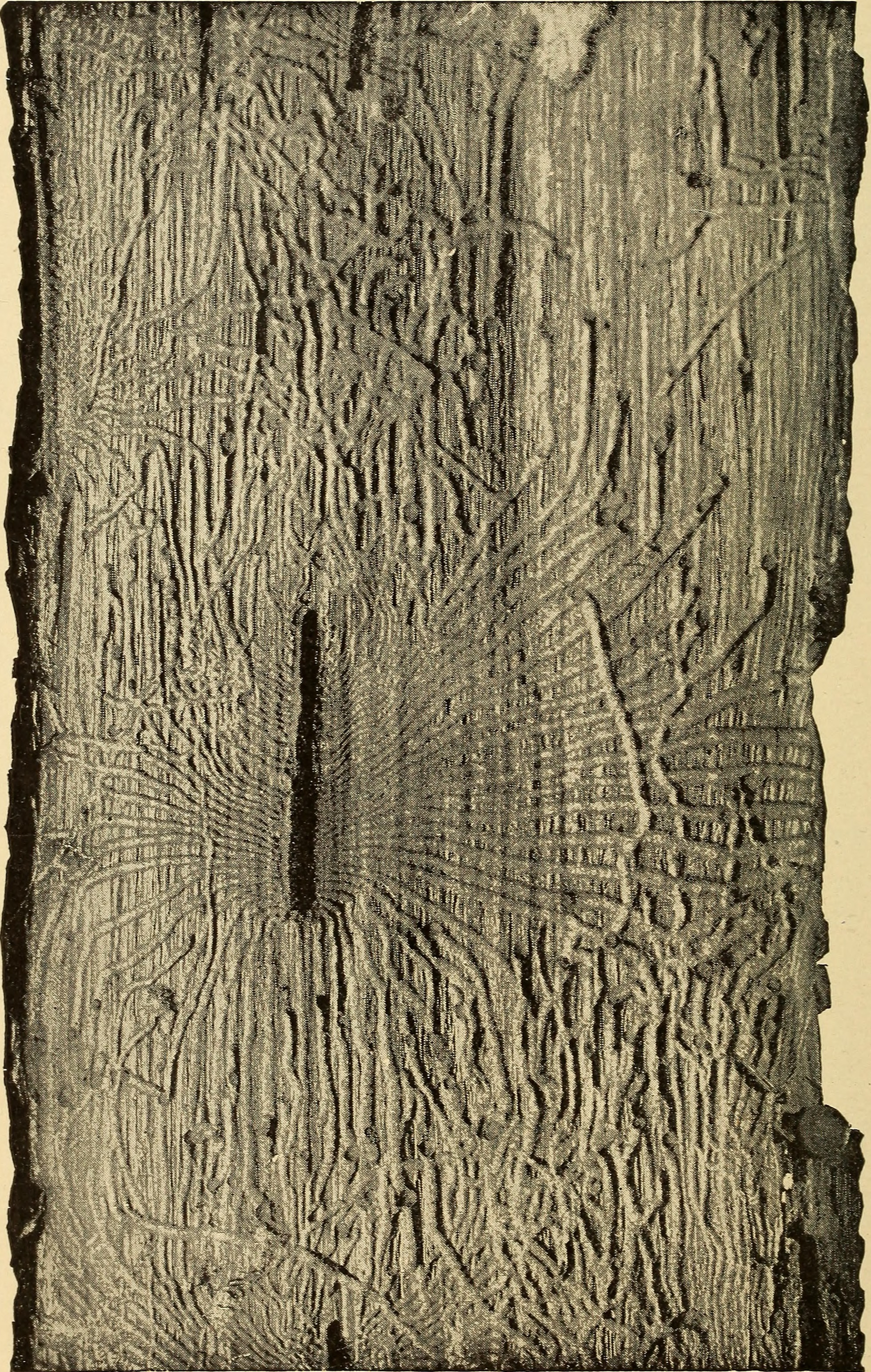
- Work of hickory bark-beetle

Scientific classification
- Domain: Eukaryota
- Kingdom: Animalia
- Phylum: Arthropoda
- Class: Insecta
- Order: Coleoptera
- Suborder: Polyphaga
- Infraorder: Cucujiformia
- Family: Curculionidae
- Genus: Scolytus
- Species: S. quadrispinosus

Binomial name
- Scolytus quadrispinosus Say, 1824

= Scolytus quadrispinosus =

Species of beetle

Scolytus quadrispinosus, the hickory bark beetle, is a species of typical bark beetle in the family Curculionidae. It is found in North America.
