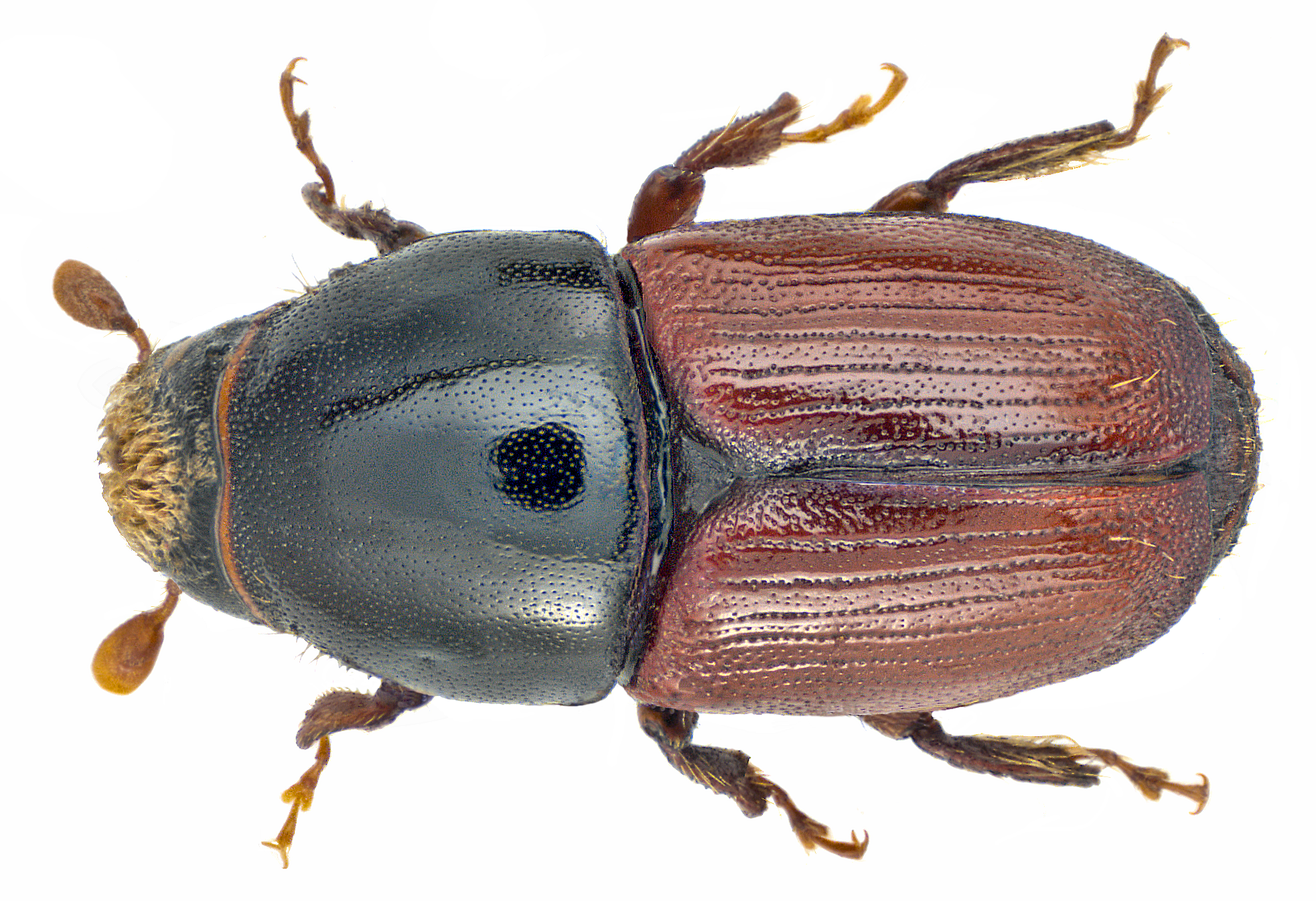

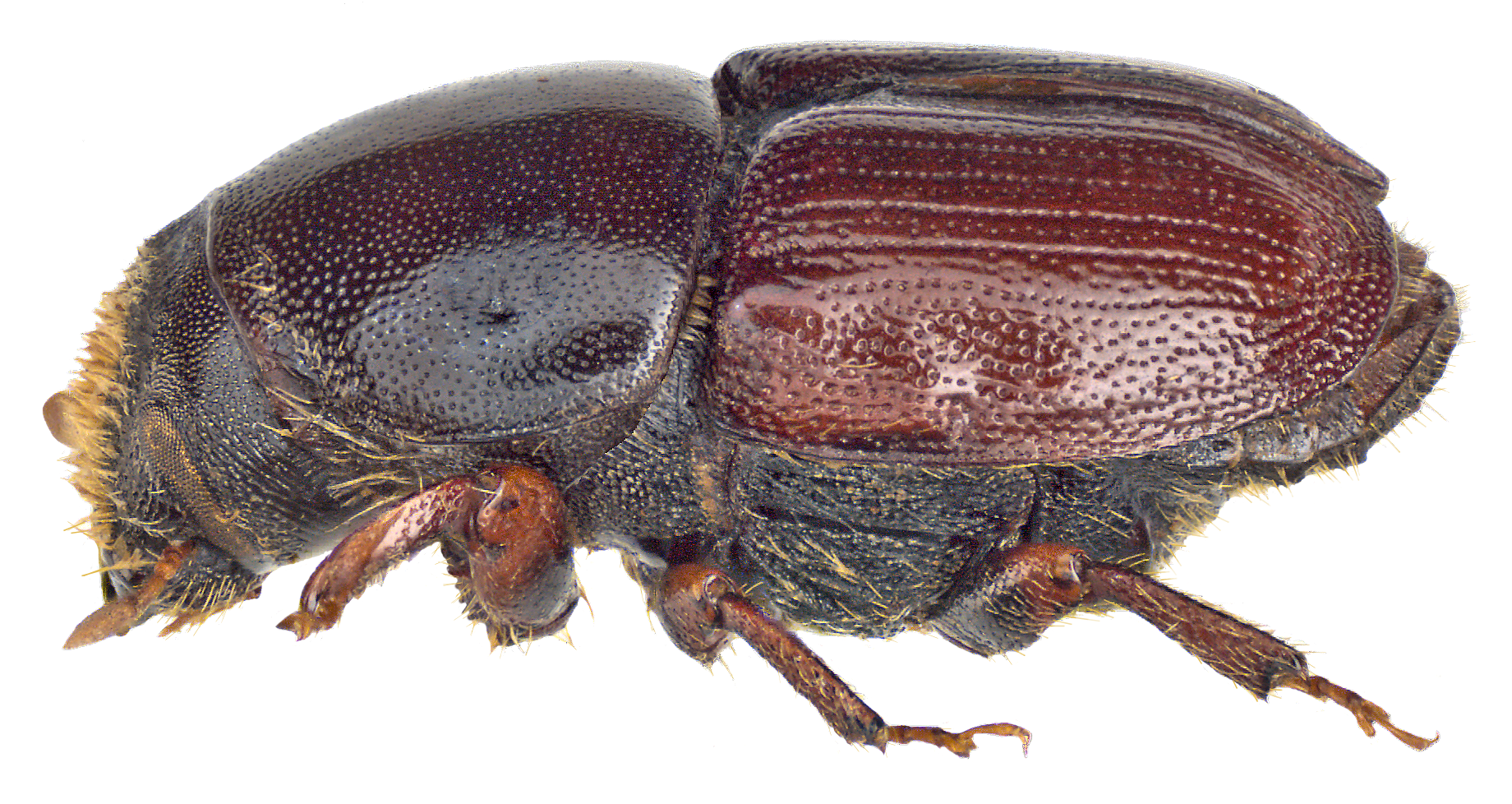
- Dorsal and lateral aspects of imago

Scientific classification
- Kingdom: Animalia
- Phylum: Arthropoda
- Class: Insecta
- Order: Coleoptera
- Suborder: Polyphaga
- Infraorder: Cucujiformia
- Family: Curculionidae
- Genus: Scolytus
- Species: S. scolytus

Binomial name
- Scolytus scolytus (Fabricius, 1775)

Synonyms
- Bostrichus scolytus Fabricius, 1775; Dermestes geoffroi Goeze, 1777; Dermestes scolythus Sulzer, 1776; Dermestes scolytus geoffroi Goeze, 1777; Eccoptogaster scolytus (Fabricius, 1775); Ekkoptogaster scolytus (Fabricius, 1775); Hylesinus scolytus (Fabricius, 1775); Ips scolytus (Fabricius, 1775); Scolytus californicus Le Conte, 1868; Scolytus destructor Olivier, 1795; Scolytus destructor var. ciliaris Rey, 1892; Scolytus fuchsi Reitter, 1913; Scolytus niger Geoffroy, 1785; Scolytus punctatus Müller, 1776; Scolytus scolytus var. variabilis Sokanovsky, 1958; Scolytus triarmatus Eggers, 1912

= Scolytus scolytus =

Species of beetle

Scolytus scolytus, the larger European elm bark beetle or large elm bark beetle, is a 3.5–6 mm long bark beetle species. It is of significant importance in Eurasia as a vector of Dutch elm disease.

== Description ==
Pronotum black and shiny, with red-brown anterior and posterior margins. Elytra, antennae, legs and abdomen are red-brown. Forehead with fine wrinkles and tubercles and a thick brush of hairs. Female's forehead convex, male's is flattened. Elytra bear well developed but shallow longitudinal punctate grooves. Elytra are tapering posteriorly. Abdomen sharply concave, oblique to the tip. In the middle of the posterior edge of the third and fourth abdominal segments there is usually an acute tubercle. The males have a continuous (although incrementally shorter toward middle) brush of golden hair at the apex of the abdomen.

== Life cycle ==
The first generation flies mainly in June, in certain years stretching from the end of May to the middle of July. The second generation flies in August. Females prefers to lay their eggs under the bark of the lower part of the trunk, in areas where the cortex is thicker, most often on weakened standing trees or fallen trees. Egg galleries are longitudinal, 2–7 cm long, over 2 mm wide but no more than 3 mm. Larval galleries start perpendicularly from the egg gallery, the upper ones are bent upward, the lower ones downward, and the ones at the middle run rather parallelly from ones another. Larval galleries located on lower parts of the trunk are imprinted on the inner surface of the cortex, sometimes on the sapwood too to some extent. Pupal chambers are usually located in the bark. After emerging, adult beetles feed on the crotches of young twigs, and leaf petioles. Partly-developed to fully developed larvae overwinter. In the northern part of its range there is usually one generation per year, in the steppes 1 to 2 generations, and in the Caucasus usually 2 with possible indications of a third one.

== Distribution ==
This species has been reported from throughout Europe and western Asia. In Russia, approximately as far east as Irkutsk Oblast and as far north as the southern boundary of the taiga zone. In Asia, it has also been reported from Turkey, Armenia, Azerbaijan, Georgia, Kazakhstan, China, northern Iran, and northern India (Jammu and Kashmir). In Africa, it has been reported from Morocco and Algeria.

== Host plants ==
Reported host plants are primarily elms, but also, common ash, common walnut tree and Caucasian zelkova, as well as a number of trees in the genera Prunus (stone fruits), Quercus (oaks), Salix (willows), and Populus (for black poplar and aspen).
