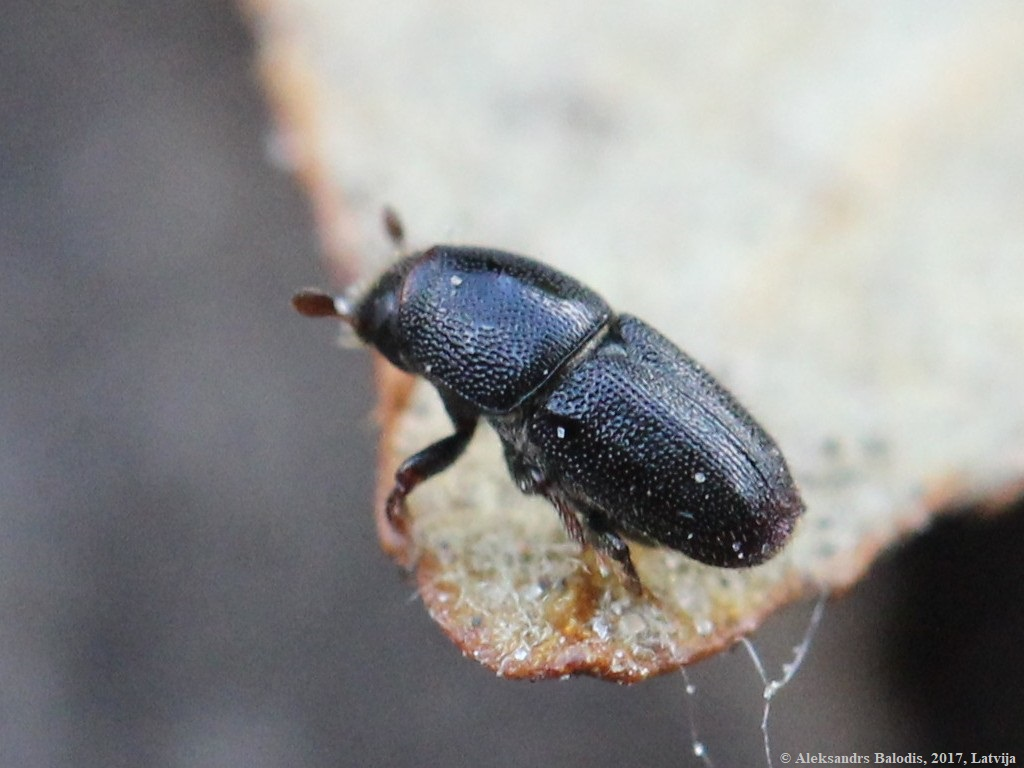

Scientific classification
- Kingdom: Animalia
- Phylum: Arthropoda
- Clade: Pancrustacea
- Class: Insecta
- Order: Coleoptera
- Suborder: Polyphaga
- Infraorder: Cucujiformia
- Superfamily: Curculionoidea
- Family: Curculionidae
- Genus: Scolytus
- Species: S. rugulosus

Binomial name
- Scolytus rugulosus (Müller, 1818)

= Scolytus rugulosus =

Shothole borer

Species of beetle

Scolytus rugulosus, known generally as shothole borer (variously spelt hyphenated or as two words), is a species of typical bark beetle in the family Curculionidae. Other common names include the fruit tree bark beetle and apple tree beetle.

== Etymology ==
Rugulosus means "finely wrinkled". The species was originally named by Otto Friedrich Müller in 1818, as Bostrichus rugulosus, and renamed to Scolytus rugulosus by him.

== Distribution ==
Scolytus rugulosus is found in the Americas, Europe, and North Asia, probably native to Europe and introduced elsewhere.

== Food ==
The shot-hole borer lives on various species of Rosaceae, especially damaged branches and trunks.

== Life cycle ==
They spend winter as mature larvae or pupae in tunnels just under the bark of the tree, with adults emerging in late spring (May in the northern hemisphere). The females fly to susceptible trees where they bore into the cambium, laying eggs in pockets along the tunnel walls. Second-generation adults emerge in summer (mid-August in the northern hemisphere). There may be two or even three generations in a year.
