= Dutch elm disease =

Elm tree fungal disease, spread by beetle

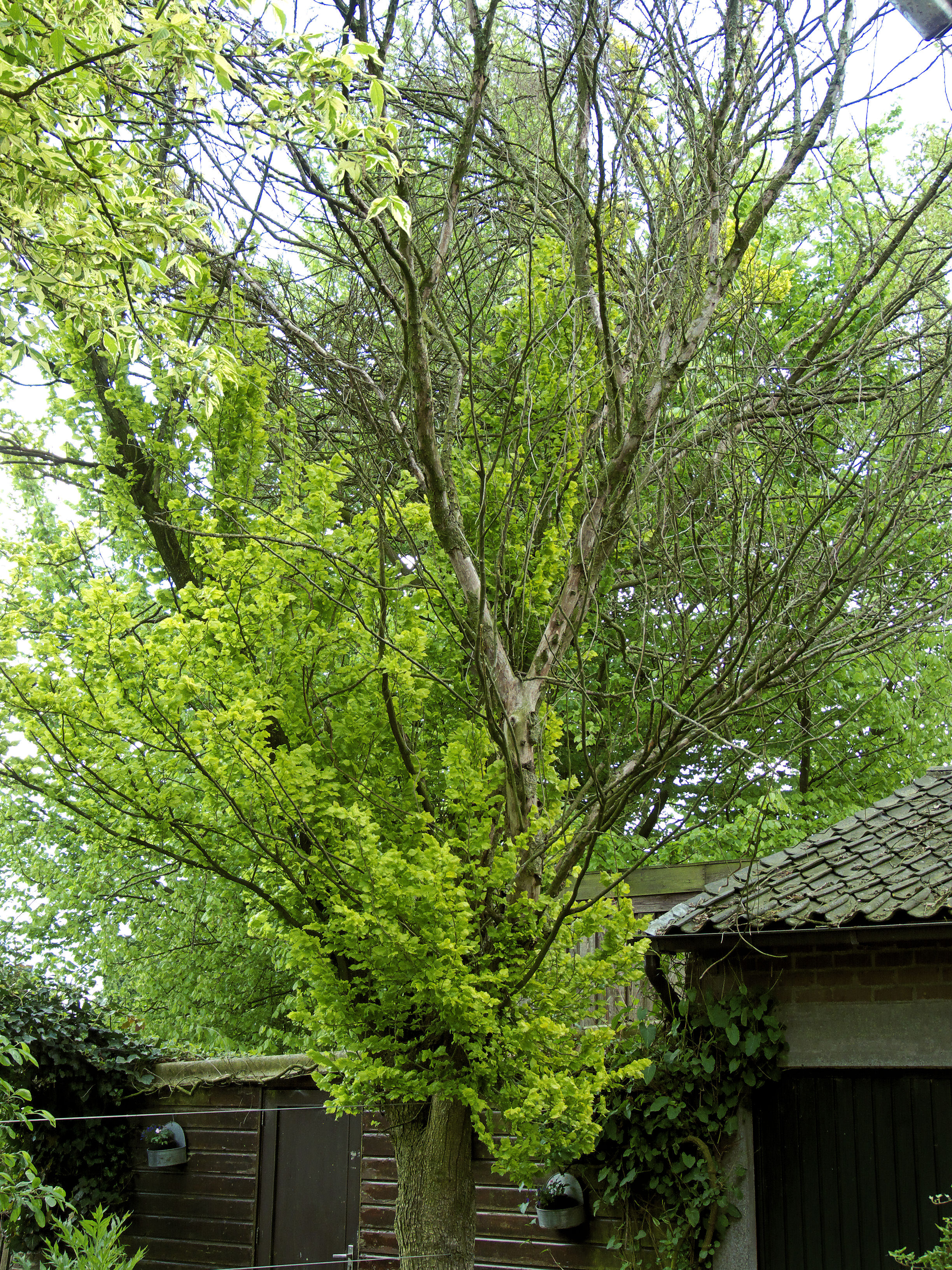
- On a golden elm with characteristic leaf shedding
- Causal agents: Ophiostoma ulmi Ophiostoma himal-ulmi Ophiostoma novo-ulmi
- Hosts: elm trees
- Vectors: elm bark beetle
- EPPO Code: CERAUL
- Distribution: Europe, North America and New Zealand

Dutch elm disease is caused by an Ascomycete fungus that kills elm trees, and is spread by elm bark beetles. Believed to be originally native to Asia, the disease was accidentally introduced into America, Europe, and New Zealand. In these regions it has devastated native and exotic populations of elms that did not have resistance to the disease. The name "Dutch elm disease" refers to its identification from 1921 onwards in the Netherlands by the Dutch phytopathologists Christine Buisman and Marie Beatrice Schol-Schwarz, who both worked with Johanna Westerdijk. The disease affects multiple species in the genera Ulmus and Zelkova, and is carried from tree to tree by any of several species of beetle, especially bark beetles of the genus Scolytus.

Multiple types of treatment or prevention have been attempted. The use of insecticides against the beetle vectors was tried in America in the 1940s and 1950s, causing significant harm to other organisms including insects and birds. Several fungicides are effective at protecting individual trees by injection every two or three years, as long as the root system has not been infected. A vaccine, Dutch Trig, uses a different fungus, Verticillium albo-atrum, to induce an immune response in individual trees. Breeding of elms resistant to Dutch elm disease has been attempted in the Netherlands, America, and Italy.

== Overview ==
=== Taxonomic range ===
Dutch elm disease affects multiple species in the genera Ulmus and Zelkova. Ulmus species affected include the English elm, Ulmus procera, which was devastated by outbreaks in the 20th century. Smooth-leaved elm, Ulmus minor, has a measure of resistance. Wych elm, Ulmus glabra, is largely avoided by the beetle that carry the disease.

=== Pathogens ===
Dutch elm disease is caused by ascomycete microfungi. Three species are now recognized:

- Ophiostoma ulmi, which afflicted Europe from 1910, reaching North America on imported timber in 1928.
- Ophiostoma himal-ulmi, a species endemic to the western Himalaya.
- Ophiostoma novo-ulmi, an extremely virulent species from Japan, first described in Europe and North America in the 1940s, has devastated elms in both continents since the late 1960s.

=== Insect vectors ===
In Europe, the elm bark beetles Scolytus scolytus, S. triarmatus, S. multistriatus and S. laevis are vectors of the disease. S. scolytus is the species that most often carries the pathogen Ophiostoma novo-ulmi . Other reported vectors include S. sulcifrons, S. pygmaeus, Pteleobius vittatus and Р. kraatzi. In North America, vectors include the native elm bark beetle, Hylurgopinus rufipes.

=== Field resistance ===
Field resistance is the ability of varieties of elm to survive once released into an environment where Dutch elm disease occurs. The European white elm (Ulmus laevis) has little or no genetic resistance to Dutch elm disease, but is distasteful to the vector beetles and has thus often avoided serious harm. Elms such as U. laevis, U. minor, and U. pumila synthesize a range of triterpenes, including alnulin, β-amyrin, friedelin, ilexol, lupenone, lupeol, methyl betulinate, and moretonol, which to varying degrees render the bark distasteful to vector beetles.

=== Mechanism ===
In an attempt to block the fungus from spreading farther, the tree reacts by plugging its own xylem tissue with gum and tyloses, bladder-like extensions of the xylem cell wall. These plugs prevent water and nutrients from travelling up the trunk of the tree, eventually killing it.

=== Symptoms ===
The first symptom of infection usually appears in an upper branch of the tree. Here, the leaves start to wither and yellow during summer, which is months before the normal autumnal leaf shedding. This morbidity spreads in a progressive manner throughout the tree, with further dieback of branches. Eventually, the roots die, starved of nutrients from the leaves. Often, not all the roots die: the roots of some species, especially the English elm (formerly Ulmus procera), can repeatedly put up suckers, which flourish for approximately 15 years before dying off.

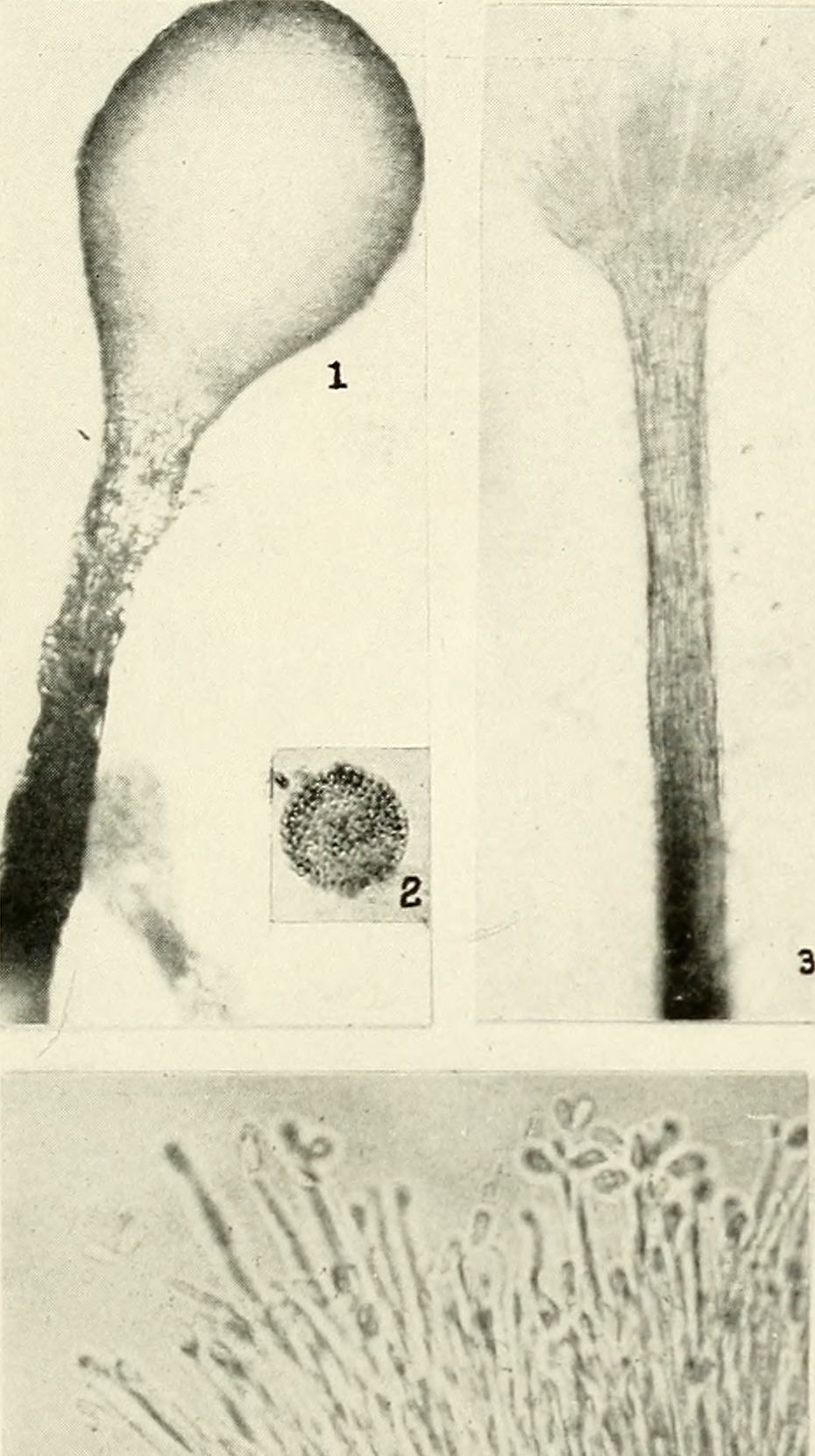
Asexual synnema of the pathogenic fungus Ophiostoma ulmi can overwinter in bark and wood, and can be spread by beetle vectors.

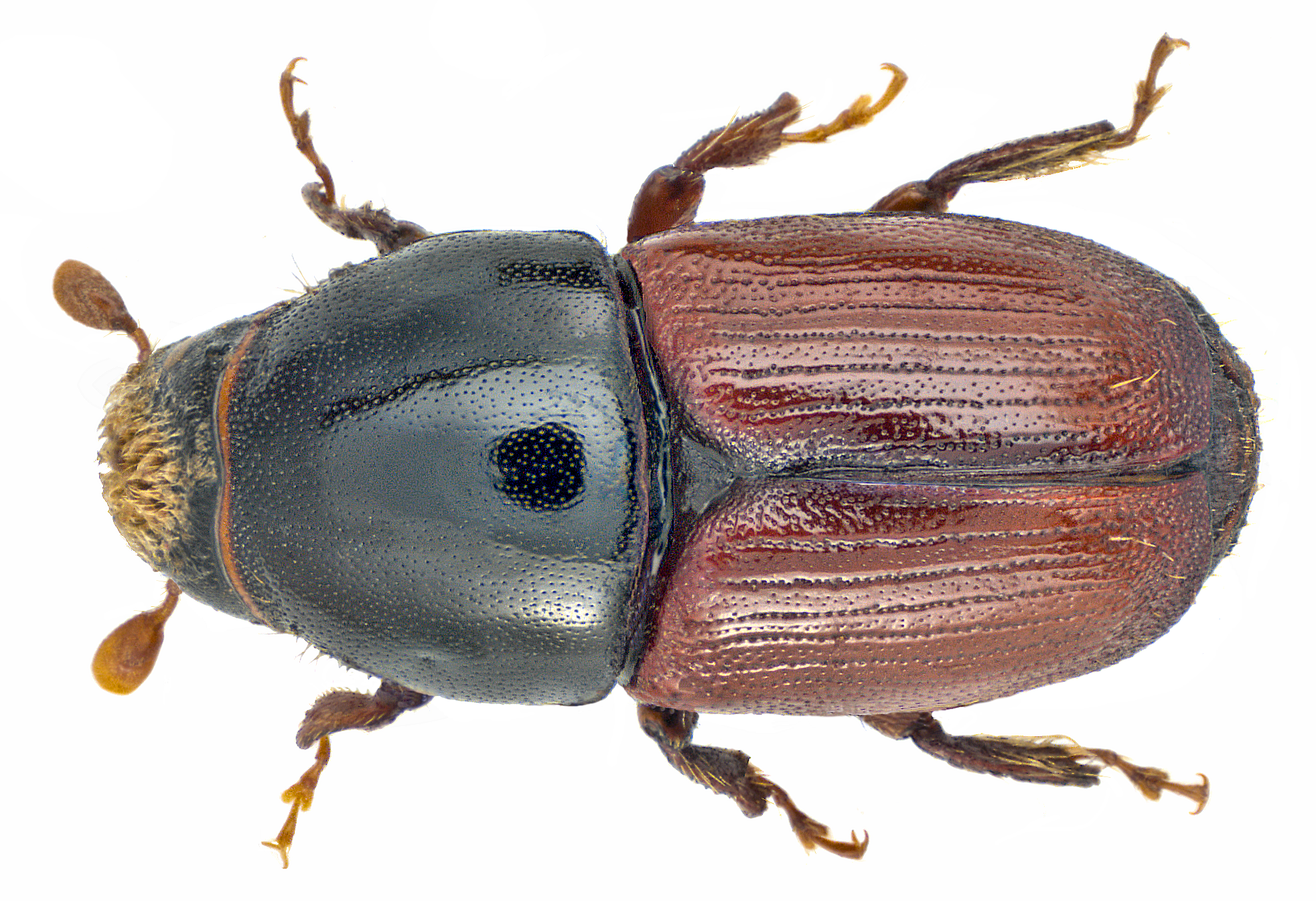
Scolytus scolytus, the larger European elm bark beetle, is a major vector of the disease.

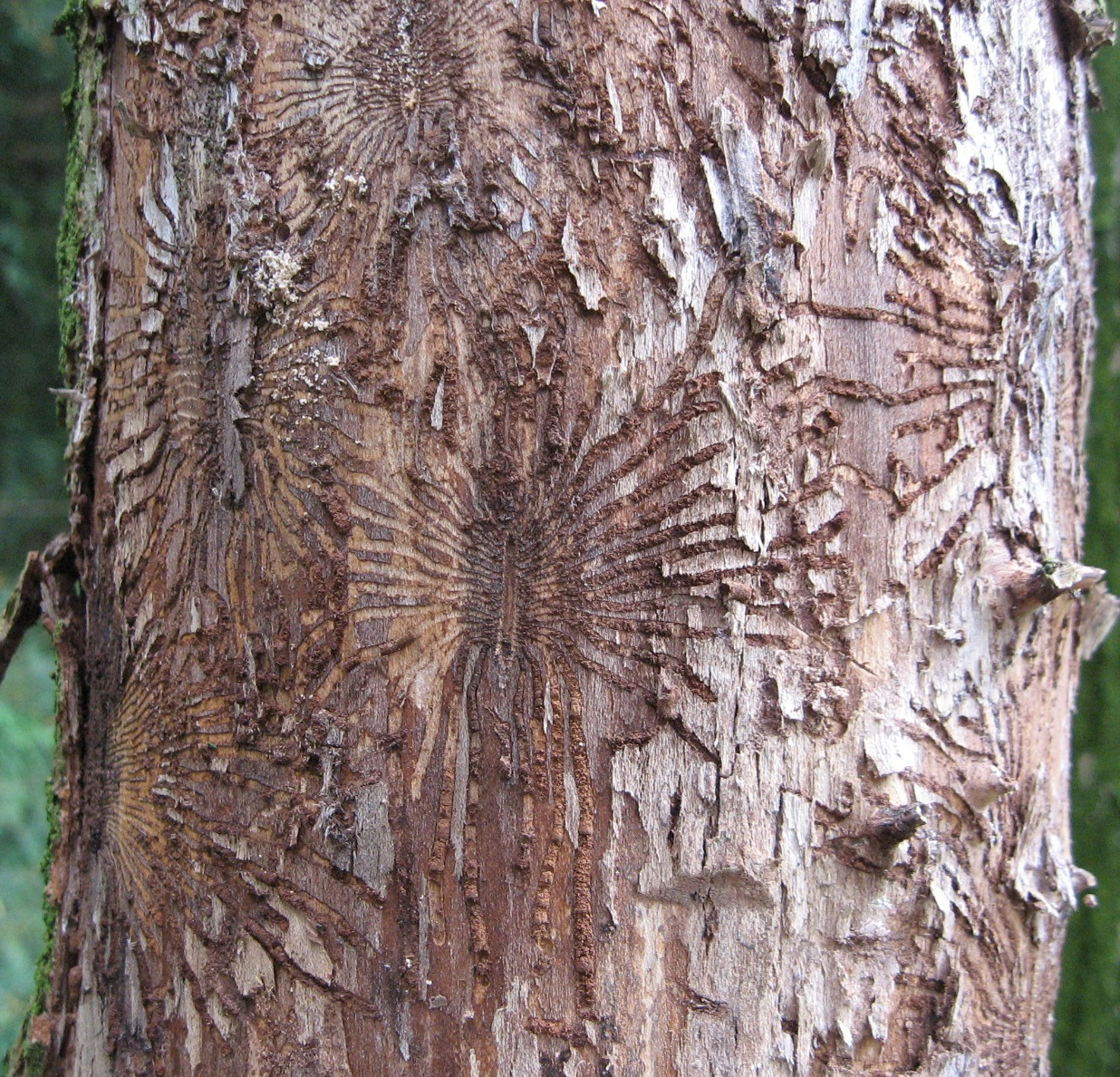
Beetle feeding galleries on wych elm trunk

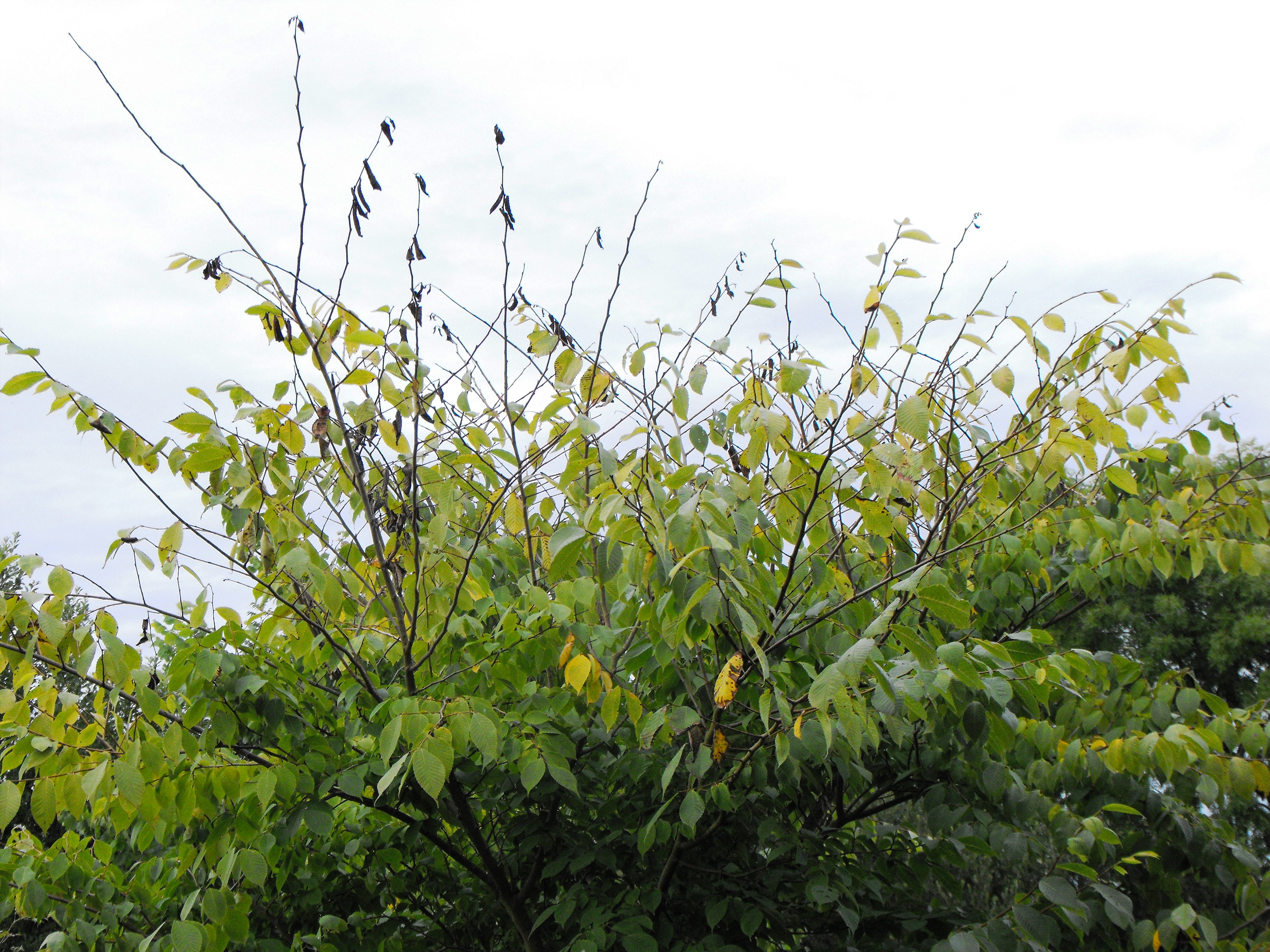
Branch death, or flagging, at multiple sites in the crown of a diseased elm

== Disease range ==
=== Europe ===
==== Beginnings ====
Dutch elm disease was first noticed in continental Europe in 1910, and spread slowly and eventually extended to all other countries except Greece and Finland. Barendina Gerarda Spierenburg compiled records of trees displaying symptoms from 1900 - 1905 onwards in the Netherlands and her publication of this information in 1921 was one part of the start of extensive research and practical measures to try to halt the disease. In addition the fungus that caused the disease was isolated in 1921 in The Netherlands by Bea Schwarz, a pioneering Dutch phytopathologist, and this discovery would lend the disease its name. Following this, in the 1920s and 30s Christine Buisman, working in the Netherlands and USA, identified the sexual stage of the fungal pathogen and also developed methods for experimental infections of elm seedlings that led to selection of resistant trees. In Britain, the disease was first identified in 1927 by T.R. Peace on English elm in Hertfordshire.

==== Epidemic ====
In around 1967, a new and far more virulent strain arrived in Britain, apparently via east coast ports on shipments of rock elm U. thomasii logs from Canada destined for the small-boat industry, confirmed in 1973 when another consignment was examined at Southampton Docks. This strain proved both highly contagious and lethal to European elms; more than 25 million trees died in the United Kingdom, while France lost 97% of its elms. The disease spread rapidly northwards, reaching Scotland within 10 years.

==== Aftermath ====
By 1990, few mature elms were left in Britain or much of continental Europe. One of the most distinctive English countryside trees, the English elm U. minor 'Atinia', is particularly susceptible as it is the elm most favoured by the Scolytus beetles. Decades after the outbreak of the epidemic, nearly all these trees are gone. The species survives in hedgerows, as the roots are not killed and send up suckers. These often reach a height of 10 m before dying off from a new attack. However, established hedges kept low by clipping have remained apparently healthy since the onset of the disease.

The largest concentrations of mature elms in Europe are now in Amsterdam and The Hague. In 2005, Amsterdam was declared the "Elm City of Europe": the city's streets and canals are lined with at least 75,000 elms, including several generations of research-elms (see below: Resistant trees). Some 30,000 of the 100,000 mature trees in The Hague are elms, planted because of their tolerance of salty sea-winds. Since the 1990s, a programme of antifungal injections of the most prominent 10,000 elms, and of sanitation felling, has reduced annual elm losses in The Hague from 7% to less than 1%. The losses are made up by the planting of disease-resistant cultivars. The largest concentration of mature elm trees remaining in England is in Brighton and Hove, East Sussex, where of the 30,000 elms in 1983 15,000 still stand (2005 figures), several of which are estimated to be over 400 years old. Their survival is owing to the isolation of the area, between the English Channel and the South Downs, and the assiduous efforts of local authorities to identify and remove infected sections of trees immediately when they show symptoms of the disease. Empowered by the Dutch Elm Disease (Local Authorities) (Amendment) Order 1988, local authorities may order the destruction of any infected trees or timber, although in practice they usually do it themselves, successfully reducing the numbers of elm bark beetle Scolytus spp. Sanitary felling has also, to date, preserved most of the 250,000 elms on the Isle of Man, where average temperature and wind speed inhibit the activity of the beetles, which need a temperature of at least 20 degrees to fly and a wind speed of less than five metres per second.

As of 2016, Edinburgh city council states that 15,000 trees survived the epidemic. A policy of sanitary felling kept losses in the city to an average of 1,000 a year, or fewer. Elm was the most common tree in Paris from the 17th century; before the 1970s there were some 30,000 ormes parisiens. Today, only 1,000 mature elms survive in the city, including examples in the large avenues (Avenue d'Italie, Avenue de Choisy, Boulevard Lefebvre, Boulevard de Grenelle, Boulevard Garibaldi) and two very old specimens, one in the garden of the Tuileries in front of the l'Orangerie and another in the Place Saint-Gervais in front of l'hôtel de ville de Paris. Losses are now being made up with disease-resistant cultivars, especially the Dutch-French research elm 'Nanguen' (Lutèce), named for the ancient Roman name for the city: Lutetia.

=== North America ===
Dutch elm disease was first reported in the United States in 1928. The beetles were believed to have arrived in a shipment of logs from the Netherlands destined for use as veneer in the Ohio furniture industry. Quarantine and sanitation procedures held most cases within 150 mi (240 km) of metropolitan New York City until 1941 when war demands began to curtail them. The disease spread from New England westward and southward, almost completely destroying the famous elms in the "Elm City" of New Haven, Connecticut, reaching Detroit in 1950, Chicago by 1960, and Minneapolis by 1970. Of the estimated 77 million elms in North America in 1930, over 75% had been lost by 1989.

The disease first appeared on the planted rows of American elm trees (Ulmus americana) on the National Mall in Washington, D.C., during the 1950s and reached a peak in the 1970s. The United States National Park Service used a number of methods to control the epidemic, including sanitation, pruning, injecting trees with fungicide and replanting with disease-resistant American elm cultivars (see Ulmus americana cultivars). The NPS combated the disease's local insect vector, the smaller European elm bark beetle (Scolytus multistriatus), by trapping and by spraying with insecticides. As a result, the population of American elms planted on the Mall and its surrounding areas has remained intact for more than 80 years.

Dutch elm disease reached eastern Canada during World War II, and spread to Ontario in 1967, Manitoba in 1975 and Saskatchewan in 1981. In Toronto, 80% of the elm trees have been lost to Dutch elm disease; many more fell victim in Ottawa, Montreal and other cities during the 1970s and 1980s. Large elm trees that were commonly scattered on farms and pastures across eastern Canada through the mid-20th Century have since become rare. Quebec City still has about 21,000 elms, thanks to a prevention program initiated in 1981. Alberta and British Columbia are the only provinces that are currently free of Dutch elm disease, although, in an isolated case, an elm tree in Wainwright, Alberta, was found diseased in June 1998 and was immediately destroyed. The presence of Dutch elm disease was monitored in this area during subsequent years but was not seen again. Today, Alberta has the largest number of elms unaffected by Dutch elm disease in the world.

The provinces of Alberta, Manitoba, and Saskatchewan all prohibit the pruning of elm trees during the middle of the year (taking effect in April, and lasting through the end of September, July, and August respectively), which they deem to be the most active time of year for bark beetles. It is illegal to use, store, sell, or transport elm firewood in the region.

The largest surviving urban forest of elm trees in North America is believed to be in the city of Winnipeg, where close to 200,000 elms remain. The city identifies and inspects elm trees, controls insect vectors, and removes and replaces problem trees, but does not use injection treatments to manage the disease.

=== New Zealand ===
Dutch elm disease has reached New Zealand. It was found in Napier where it was eradicated and was also found in the Auckland Region in 1989. The Ministry of Agriculture funded a national management programme but it was cancelled to allow more funds to be available for pests of a higher priority. A major outbreak occurred in New Zealand in July 2013, particularly at the site of Kingseat Hospital, south of Auckland. Auckland has 20,000 elms.

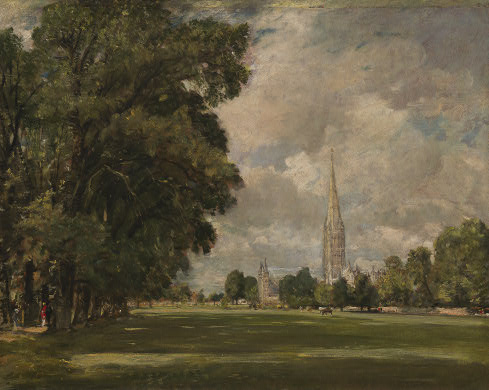
Salisbury Cathedral from Lower Marsh Close, 1820, by John Constable depicts mature English elms, long before the epidemic.

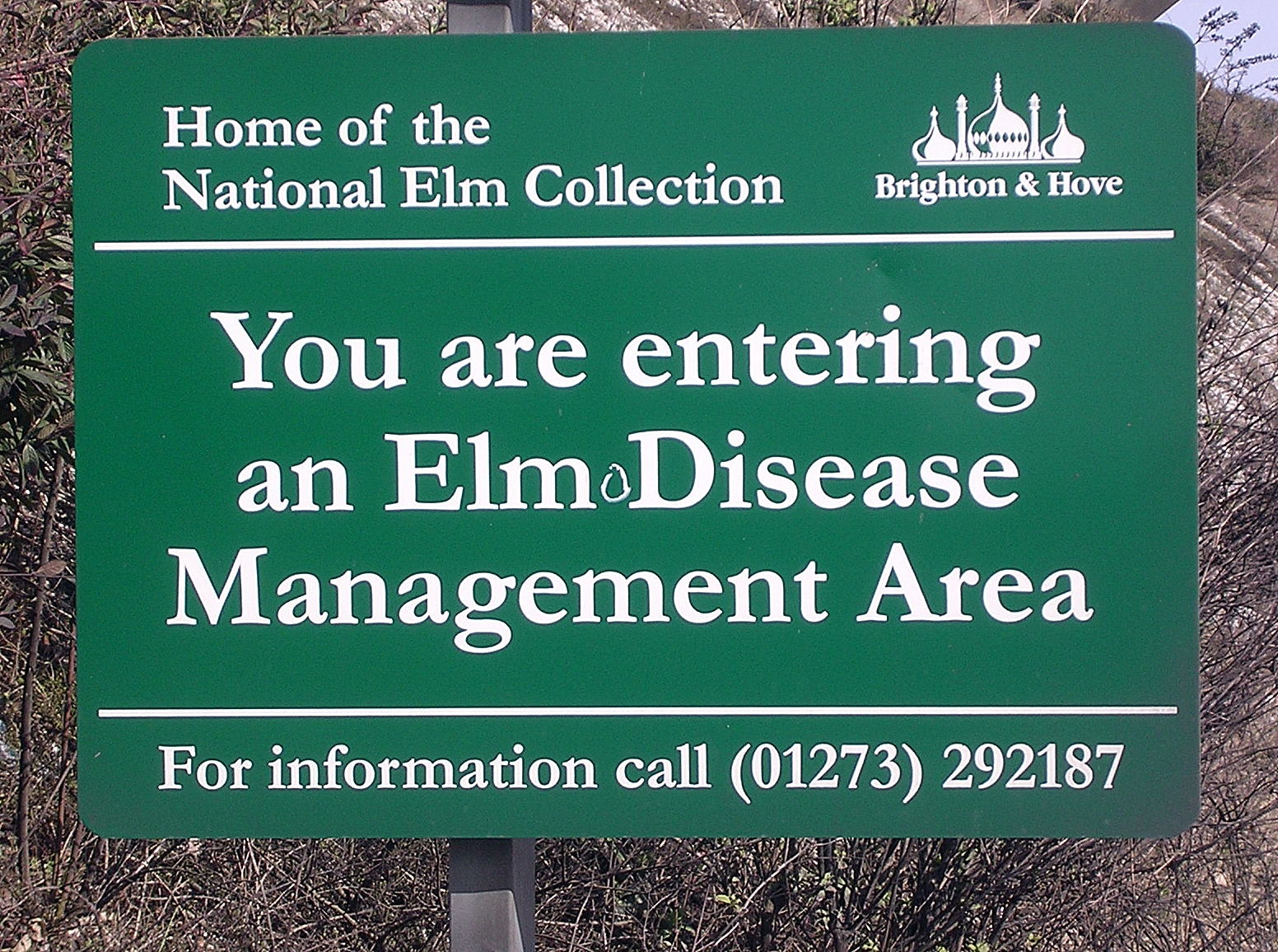
Sign on A27, Brighton, 2008

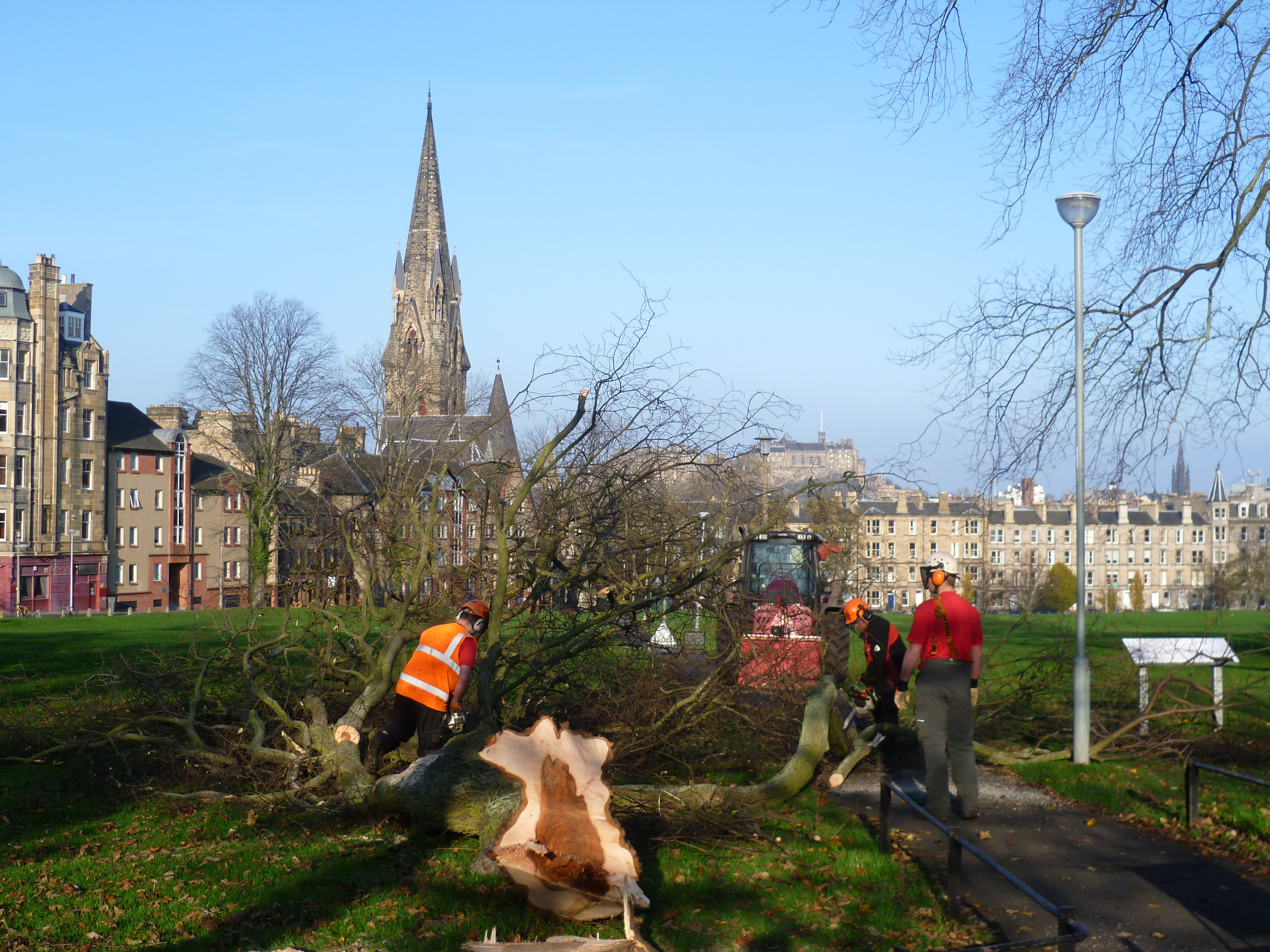
Felling a diseased elm, Edinburgh, 2011

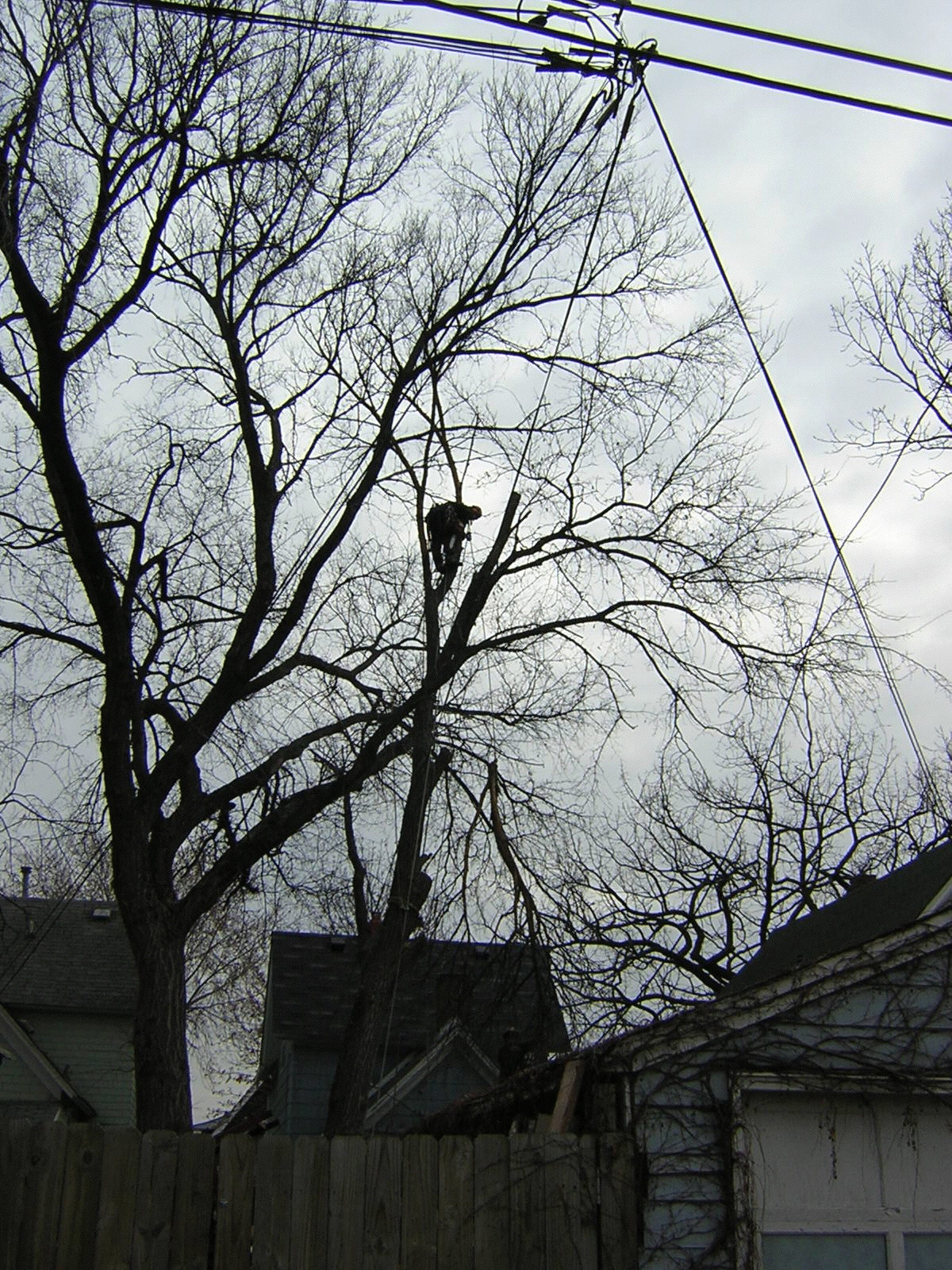
Arborist removing infected elm in Saint Paul, Minnesota, 2005

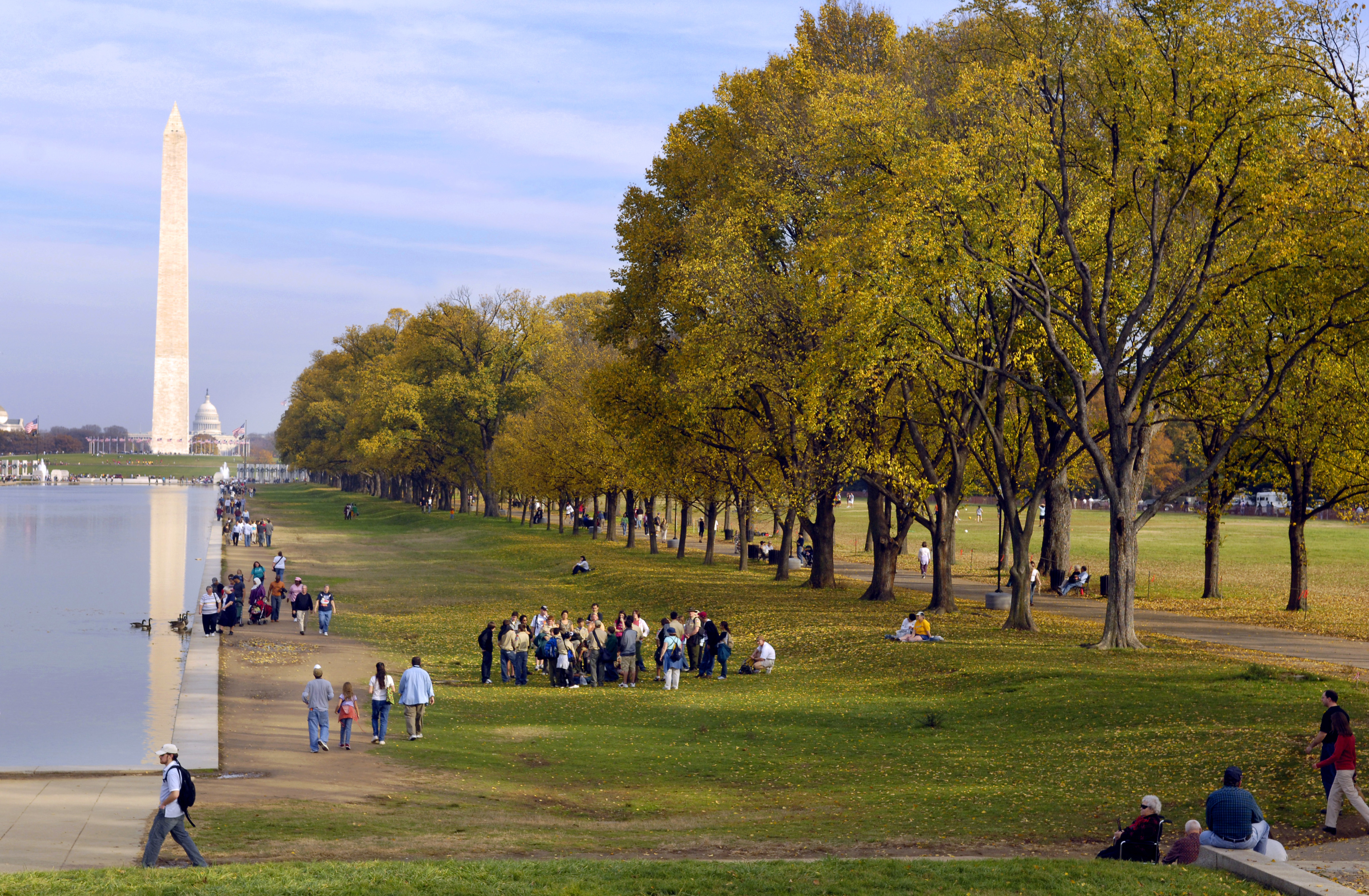
Rows of American elm trees south of the Lincoln Memorial Reflecting Pool on the National Mall in Washington, D.C., 2006

== Treatment ==
=== Mechanical ===
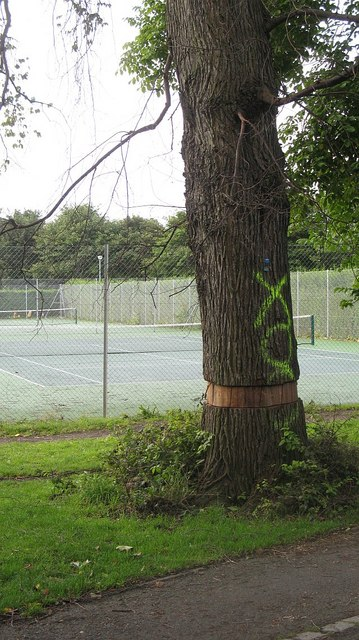
Diseased elm ringbarked to slow down transmission before felling. Edinburgh, 2008

The first attempts to control Dutch elm disease consisted of pruning trees to remove and burn diseased timber. In 1963, The New York Times reported that this approach, combined by spraying with DDT, had failed.

=== Chemical ===
==== Insecticides ====
In the US, when Dutch elm disease spread away from the Atlantic coast, control focused on controlling the bark beetle by using insecticides such as DDT and dieldrin, which were sprayed heavily across all parts of elm trees, usually twice a year in the spring and again at a lower concentration in the summer. In its early years, it was generally thought by observers that pesticides did slow the spread of the disease across the United States but as early as 1947, concern was raised that many bird species were killed in large numbers by ingesting poisoned invertebrates. In areas sprayed during the 1950s, local people observed birds such as the American woodcock, American robin, white-breasted nuthatch, brown creeper and Poecile species (chickadees) dying. Biologist Rachel Carson consequently argued for improved sanitation and against spraying elms, which she saw as having been more effective in areas with earlier and greater experience countering Dutch elm disease. Spraying against elm bark beetles declined very rapidly after 1962, a trend aided by fungicides.

==== Fungicides ====
The fungicide carbendazim phosphate is marketed as a treatment for Dutch elm disease, under names such as Eertavas.

Arbotect (thiabendazole hypophosphite) is effective against the disease. It must be injected every two to three years to provide ongoing control; the disease generally cannot be eradicated once a tree is infected. Arbotect is not effective on root graft infections from adjacent elm trees.

Alamo (propiconazole) too is effective against Dutch elm disease. Neither it nor Arbotect are effective on trees with an infected root system.

==== Pheromones ====
The pheromone produced by female elm bark beetles, multistriatin, can be produced synthetically. It was thought in 1983 that it might have potential to be used to trap male beetles, which carry the fungus.

=== Biological ===
Because of the ban on the use of chemicals on street and park trees in the Netherlands, the University of Amsterdam developed a biological vaccine by the late 1980s. Dutch Trig is nontoxic, consisting of a suspension in distilled water of spores of a strain of the fungus Verticillium albo-atrum that has lost much of its pathogenic capabilities, injected in the elm in spring. The strain is believed to have enough pathogenicity left to induce an immune response in the elm, protecting it against Dutch elm disease during one growing season. This is called induced resistance. Trials with the American elm have been successful; in a six-year experiment with the American elm in Denver, Colorado, there were large declines in annual Dutch elm disease losses after the first year from 7 percent to between 0.4 and 0.6 percent; a greater and more rapid reduction in disease incidence than the accompanying tree sanitation and plant health care programs.

== Breeding resistant trees ==
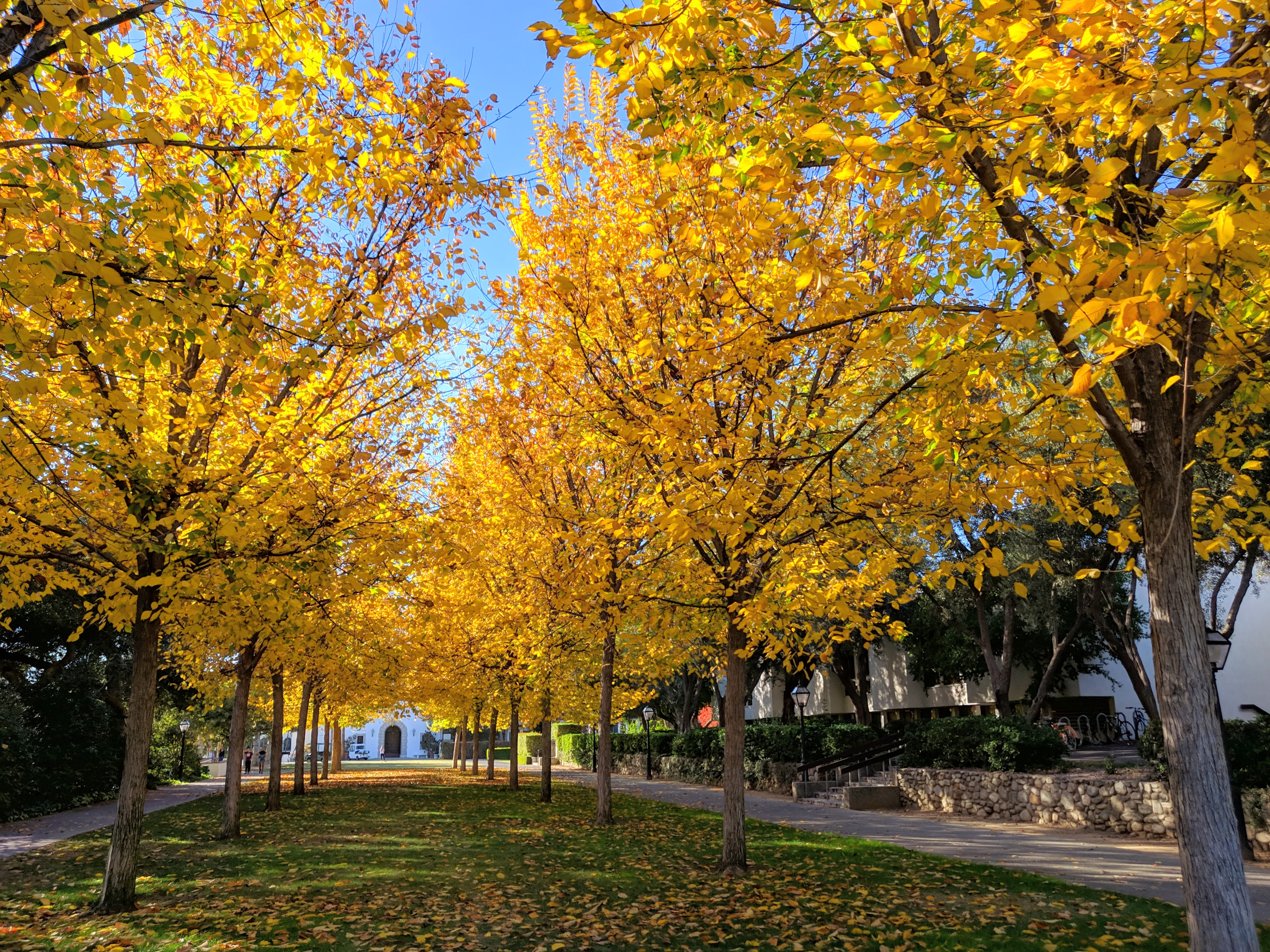
Row of Princeton elm trees at Scripps College in Claremont, California, 2008, resistant to Dutch elm disease

Research to select resistant cultivars and varieties began in the Netherlands in 1928, followed by work on Ulmus americana cultivars in the United States in 1937. U. americana is incompatible with European elms, preventing breeders from making hybrids that visually resemble the vase-shaped American elm and that have resistance to the disease. In 2005, the USA's National Elm Trial began a 10-year evaluation of 19 cultivars in plantings across the United States.

In Italy, the Istituto per la Protezione delle Piante, Florence, worked to produce a range of disease-resistant trees adapted to the warmer Mediterranean climate, using Asiatic species crossed with the early Dutch hybrid 'Plantyn' as a safeguard against any future mutation of the disease.

In 2007, the Elm Recovery Project of the University of Guelph Arboretum in Ontario, Canada, reported that cuttings from healthy surviving old elms surveyed across Ontario had been grown to produce a bank of resistant trees, isolated for selective breeding of highly resistant cultivars.

In 2007, A.E. Newhouse and F. Schrodt of the State University of New York College of Environmental Science and Forestry in Syracuse reported that young transgenic American elm trees had shown reduced symptoms and normal mycorrhizal colonization.

Among European species, the European white elm U. laevis has little innate resistance to Dutch elm disease, but is eschewed by the vector bark beetles and only rarely becomes infected. It is protected by organic compounds such as triterpenes and sterols which make its bark unattractive to the beetles that spread the disease.

== Possible earlier occurrences ==
=== The prehistoric "Elm Decline" ===
Analysis of fossil pollen in peat samples shows that elms, abundant in prehistoric times, all but disappeared from northwestern Europe during the mid-Holocene period around 4000 BC, and to a lesser extent around 1000 BC. This roughly synchronous and widespread event is called the "Elm Decline". When first detected in the mid-20th century, the decline was attributed to the impact of forest-clearance by Neolithic farmers, and of elm-coppicing for animal fodder, though the numbers of settlers could not have been large. The devastation caused by Dutch elm disease in the 20th century has provided an alternative explanation. Examination of subfossil elm wood with signs of the disease suggests that it may have been responsible. Fossil finds from this period of elm bark beetles support this theory. A consensus is that the Elm Decline was probably driven by both factors.

=== Historic period ===
A less devastating form of the disease, caused by a different fungus, had possibly been present in north-west Europe for some time. Dr Oliver Rackham of Cambridge University presented evidence of an outbreak of elm disease in north-west Europe, c. 1819–1867. "Indications from annual rings [a reference to the dark staining in an annual ring in infected elms] confirm that Dutch elm disease was certainly present in 1867," he wrote, quoting contemporary accounts of diseased and dying elms, including this passage from Richard Jefferies' 1883 book, Nature near London:

There is something wrong with elm trees. In the early part of this summer, not long after the leaves were fairly out upon them, here and there a branch appeared as if it had been touched with red-hot iron and burnt up, all the leaves withered and browned on the boughs. First one tree was thus affected, then another, then a third, till, looking round the fields, it seemed as if every fourth or fifth tree had thus been burnt. [...] Upon mentioning this I found that it had been noticed in elm avenues and groups a hundred miles distant, so that it is not a local circumstance.

Earlier still, Rackham noted, "The name Scolytus destructor was given to the great bark beetle on evidence, dating from c. 1780, that it was destroying elms around Oxford."

In Belgium, elm die-back and death was observed in 1836 and 1896 in Brussels, and in 1885–1886 in Ghent. In the later outbreaks the die-back was attributed to the elm bark beetle.

Sir Thomas Browne, writing in 1658, noted in The Garden of Cyrus that an elm disease that was spreading through English hedgerows, and described symptoms reminiscent of Dutch elm disease.

== See also ==
- Forest pathology
