= Barendina Gerarda Spierenburg =

Dutch plant pathologist

- fair use image only
- Born: April 10, 1880; Rotterdam, Netherlands
- Died: December 10, 1967 (aged 87); Rotterdam, Netherlands
- Other name: Dina Spierenburg
- Education: Utrecht University
- Known for: plant pathology, especially Dutch elm disease
- Scientific career
- Workplaces: Plant Protection Service, Wageningen

Barendina (Dina) Gerarda Spierenburg (1880 - 1967) was a plant pathologist from the Netherlands, particularly known for her work on Dutch elm disease.

== Education and personal life ==
Spierenburg was born in Rotterdam in the Netherlands on 10 April 1880. Her parents were Gerardus Jacobus Spierenburg and Anna Wilhelmina Hisschemöller. She initially worked as a schoolteacher but studied in a programme at Utrecht University from 1915 - 1919 while continuing to teach at several secondary schools in Rotterdam, The Hague and Dordrecht.

After retirement she travelled extensively in Europe and North Africa and studied music and languages. She died 10 November 1967 in Rotterdam.

== Career ==
Initially a schoolteacher, Spierenburg took a degree when in her 30s. After graduating she was employed from 1919 by the Phytopathological Service based in Wageningen. It underwent an organisational restructuring and she was assigned to the Plant Protection Service and worked there until she retired in 1945.

She was involved in describing, identifying and monitoring the distribution of a new disease of elms, now called Dutch elm disease, from the start of her career. She recorded pictures of disease symptoms in elm wood that showed the disease was present from at least 1900-1905. Her publication in 1921 about this disease of elm trees in the Netherlands was the start of extensive research and practical measures to try to halt the disease. She worked together with Marie Beatrice Schol-Schwarz and Christine Buisman to understand this new pathogen. Spierenburg studied the morphology of the disease on both the exterior and interior of elm trees. She performed experimental infections with mixtures of fungal isolates, while those using single spore isolates by Schol-Schwarz clarified the identity of the causal organism of the disease.

Spierenburg also studied diseases of cabbage and identified a novel black spot disease of gladiolus.

== Publications ==
Two of her most significant publications are:

- Dina Spierenburg, (1921) Plant Disease Observation I. An unknown disease among elms. Communication 18 of the Phytopathological Service pp 3 – 10. (Een onbekende ziekte in de iepen. Plantenziektenkundige Waarnemingen I. Medededeling 18 van den Phytopathologischen Dienst. 1921 januari 3 - 10.)
- B. G. Spierenburg, (1922) Plant Disease Observation II. An unknown disease among elms II. Reports and Communication of the Plant Disease Service at Wageningen Number 24 pp 1 – 31. (Een onbekende ziekte in de iepen II. Verslagen en Mededelingen van den Plantenziektenkundigen Dienst te Wageningen nr. 24, pp1 – 31.)
