= Ophiostoma novo-ulmi =

Scientific classification
- Kingdom: Fungi
- Division: Ascomycota
- Class: Sordariomycetes
- Order: Ophiostomatales
- Family: Ophiostomataceae
- Genus: Ophiostoma
- Species: O. novo-ulmi

Binomial name
- Ophiostoma novo-ulmi Brasier

Species of fungus

Ophiostoma novo-ulmi is a species of fungus in the family Ophiostomataceae. It is one of the key causative agents associated with Dutch Elm Disease (DED), along with Ophiostoma ulmi and Ophiostoma himal-ulmi.

Dutch Elm Disease was first identified in Europe during the early 1900s and by the 1940s the disease had spread throughout Europe and into the United States and Canada. Elm trees (Ulmus) were heavily used as a trade commodity in logging practices in the late 1800s-1900s. Historically, these trees have seen widespread use as a building material in products such as wheels, chairs, ships, and coffins. Wood from Ulmus trees has been favored for building due to the trees' ability to withstand prolonged exposure to water without rotting. The adaptability of this tree along with its multitude of applications for building opened up its demand in trading.

It has been determined that Ophiostoma ulmi and Ophiostoma novo-ulmi have evolved separately from each other in different regions of the world though it has been thought that novo-ulmi has obtained genes from Ophiostoma ulmi making it a more effective pathogen for Elm trees.

O. ulmi caused one of the first pandemics of the species, within Europe and North America, between 1910-1940 and caused 10-40% death of genus Ulmus. This pandemic was followed by a second pandemic beginning in the 1940s caused by the O. novo-ulmi species. This pathogen proved to be more invasive and aggressive in comparison to other species associated with the disease. The introduction of O. novo-ulmi is traced back to the logging trade among regions. Logs infected with the pathogen and traded throughout Europe and intercontinentally leading to the spread of the fungus. O. novo-ulmi came in contact with various amounts of highly susceptible host species in Europe, western Asia and North America making it easier to spread Dutch Elm Disease. Bark beetles have become a vector for the fungus to spread among elm tree groves. The bark beetles often carry spores on their bodies. The spores are easily transferred via twig crotches where they obstruct vessels by gums, tyloses, fungal material and foliage wilts, causing the tree to die. These beetles complete an entire life cycle in one elm tree until the tree can no longer support the beetles. Following this young beetles will find healthy trees to inhabit which they infect with spores they carry from the previous elm tree. When the beetles feed on the tree they introduce the fungi to the food and water supply of the tree via the branches connecting to the xylem of the tree, allowing rapid spread throughout the vascular tissue of the tree.

Once the fungus has been introduced to the vascular tissue of the tree it spreads rapidly, causing death as a result of the tree's natural immune response. In the xylem vessels the fungus produces yeast-like spores and multicellular filamentous hyphae. This allows for vertical movement in the vessels, then moves laterally to infect neighboring vessels. Logs that contain both the fungi and beetles can transmit the pathogen to native species at much higher rate and cause a greater range for invasion. Furthermore, O. novo-ulmi can also spread from infected trees to healthy trees through root grafts. When the roots of adjacent elm trees come into contact with each other underground, the fungus can move from the infected tree to the healthy tree through these root connections. It can also invade an elm tree through wounds on the bark or branches. This can occur naturally through storms, animal activity, or human interventions such as pruning or other tree care practices. The spores of the fungus can enter the tree through these wounds and establish an infection. Once inside the tree, O. novo-ulmi grows in the water-conducting vessels of the tree, blocking the flow of water and nutrients, which eventually leads to wilting, yellowing of leaves, and tree death. The fungus also produces toxic compounds that further contribute to the damage to the tree's vascular system and overall health.

O. novo-ulmi infestation can spread rapidly, causing severe damage and death to susceptible elm trees. Effective management strategies, such as tree removal, pruning, and applications, may be used to control the spread of the disease in affected areas. Early detection and prevention are key in managing Dutch elm disease caused by O. novo-ulmi.
