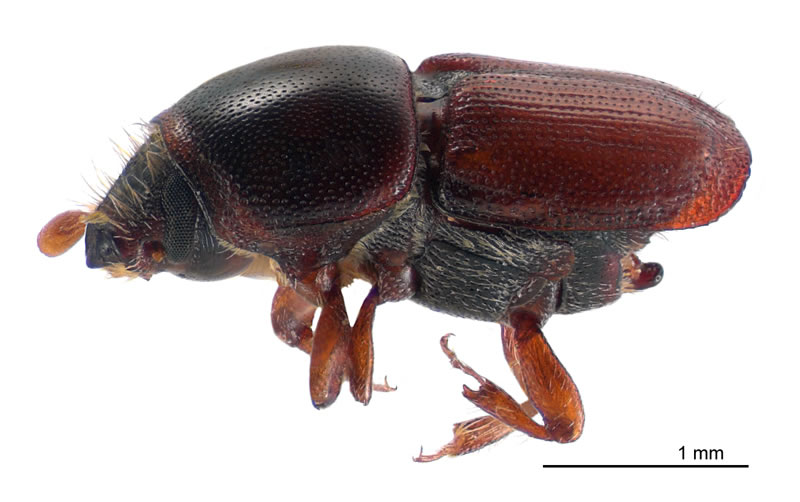
- Scolytus multistriatus lateral

Scientific classification
- Domain: Eukaryota
- Kingdom: Animalia
- Phylum: Arthropoda
- Class: Insecta
- Order: Coleoptera
- Suborder: Polyphaga
- Infraorder: Cucujiformia
- Family: Curculionidae
- Genus: Scolytus
- Species: S. multistriatus

Binomial name
- Scolytus multistriatus (Marsham, 1802)

Synonyms
- Ips multistriatus

= Scolytus multistriatus =

Species of beetle

Scolytus multistriatus, the European elm bark beetle or smaller European elm bark beetle, is a bark beetle species in the genus Scolytus. In Europe, while S. multistriatus acts as vector of the Dutch elm disease, caused by the Ascomycota Ophiostoma ulmi, it is much less effective than the large elm bark beetle, S. scolytus.

S. multistriatus uses vanillin and syringaldehyde as signals to find a host tree during oviposition.

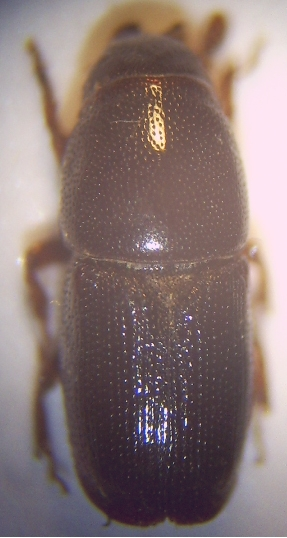
female

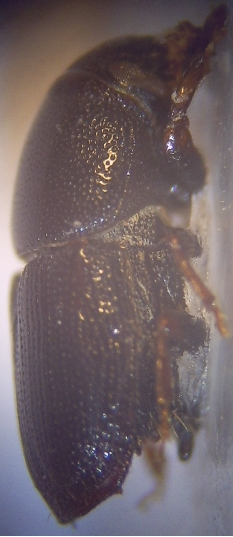
female

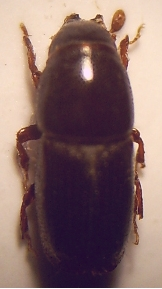
female

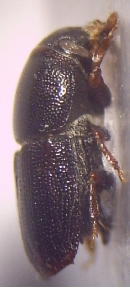
female

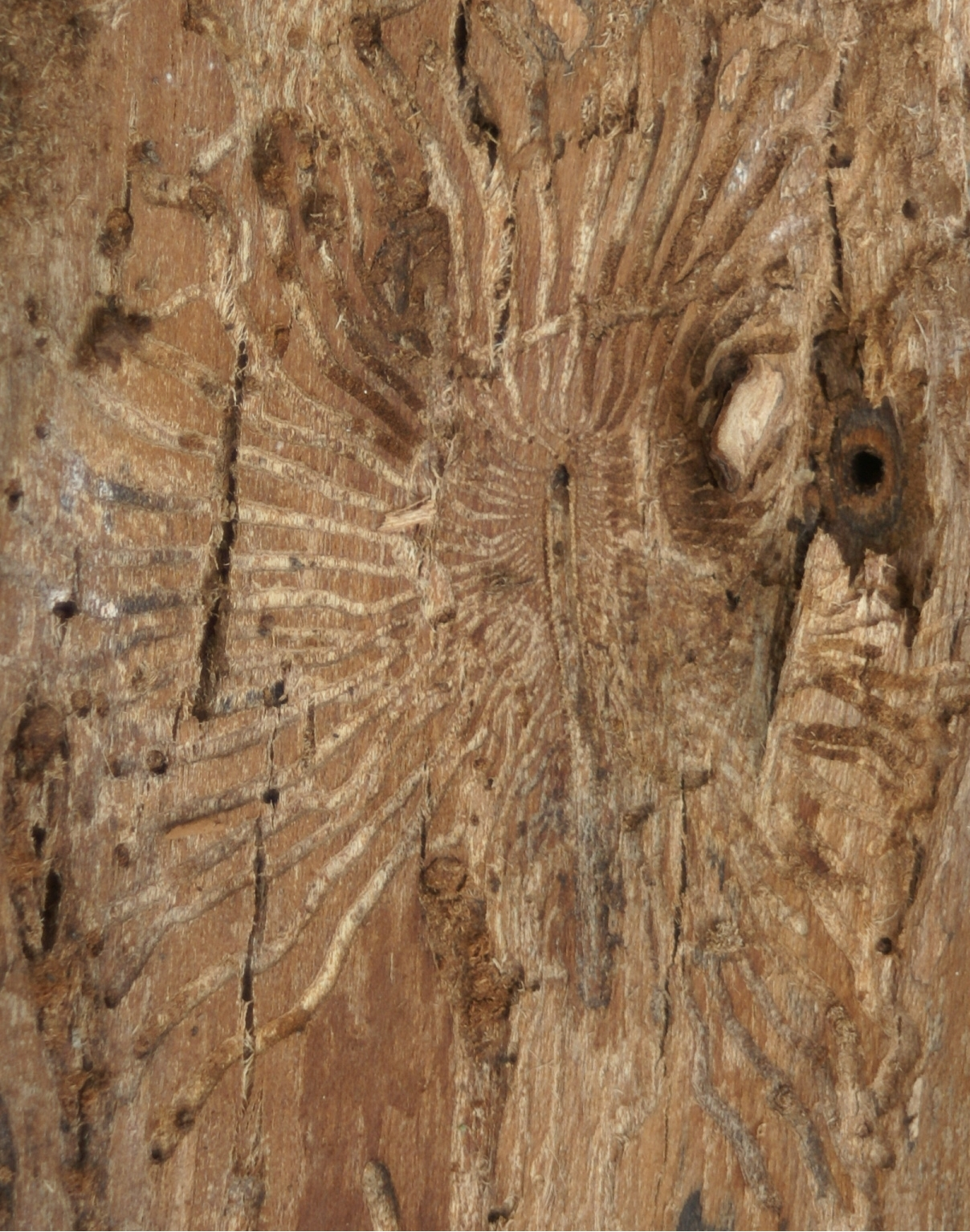
Scolytus multistriatus, larvae imprint in Ulmus glabra

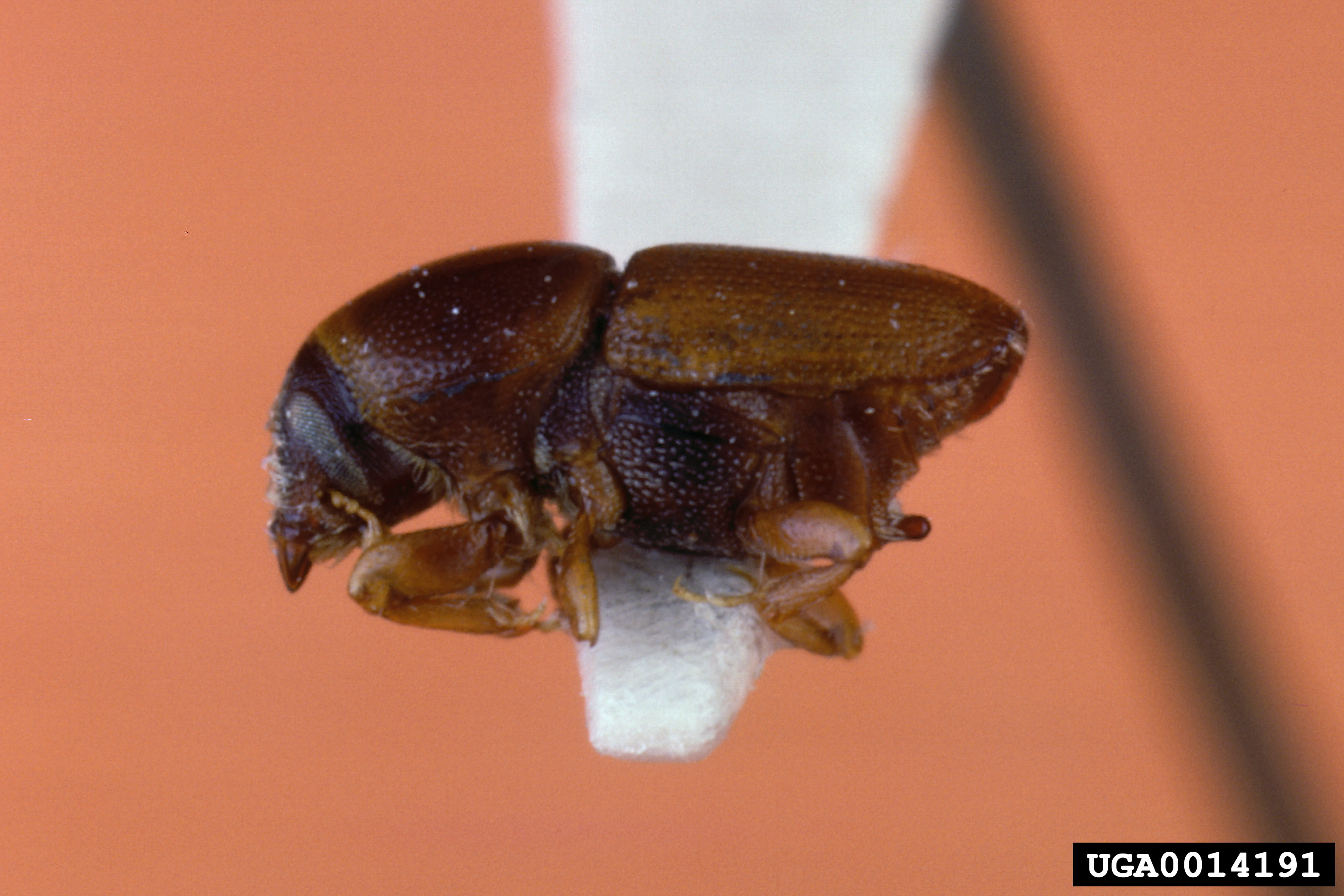
