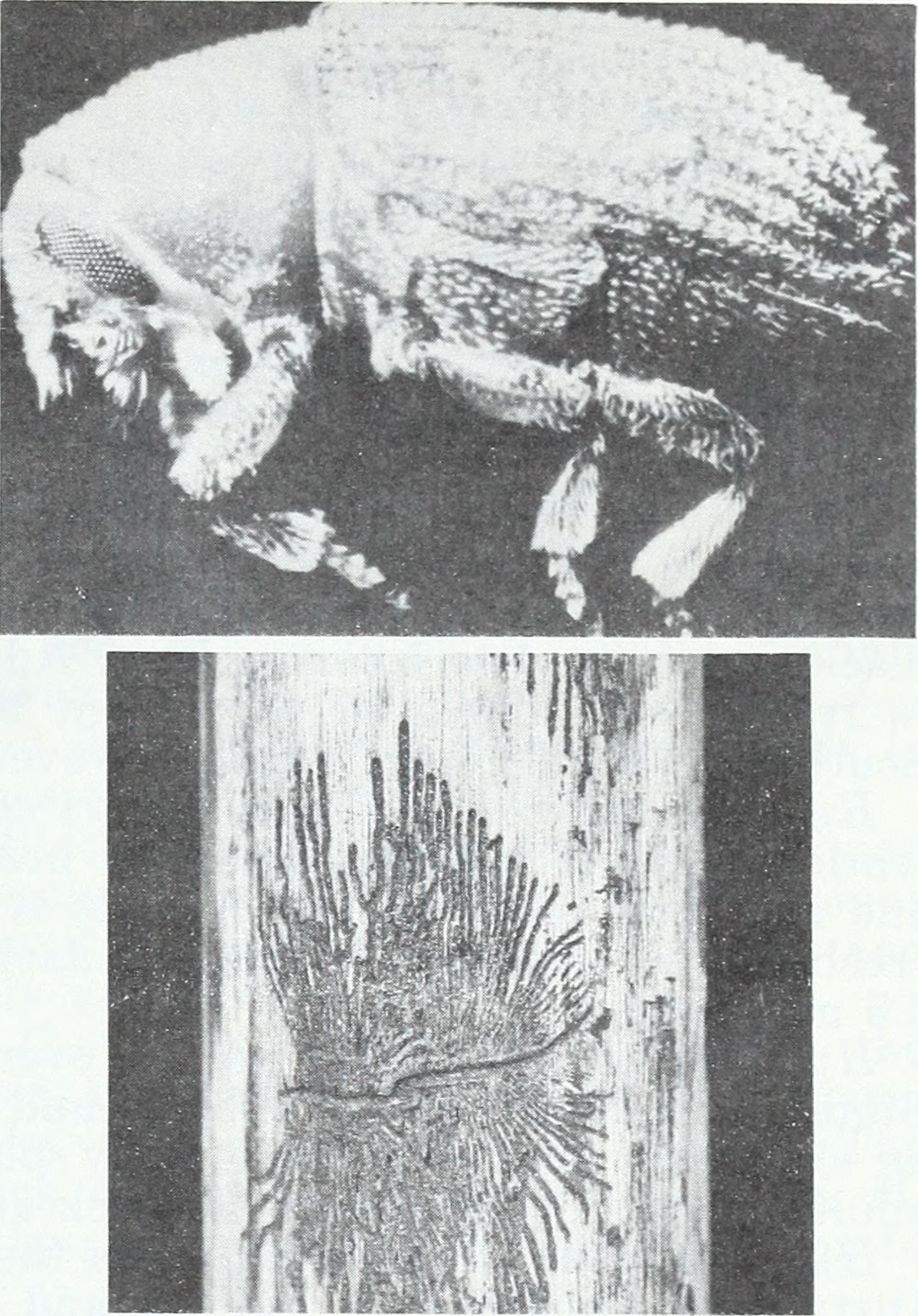
- Imago and gallery pattern

Scientific classification
- Kingdom: Animalia
- Phylum: Arthropoda
- Class: Insecta
- Order: Coleoptera
- Suborder: Polyphaga
- Infraorder: Cucujiformia
- Family: Curculionidae
- Subfamily: Scolytinae
- Tribe: Hylesinini
- Genus: Hylurgopinus; J.M.Swaine, 1918
- Species: H. rufipes

Binomial name
- Hylurgopinus rufipes J.M.Swaine, 1918

Synonyms
- Hylastes rufipes Eichhoff; Hylesinus opaculus LeConte

= Hylurgopinus =

Species of beetle

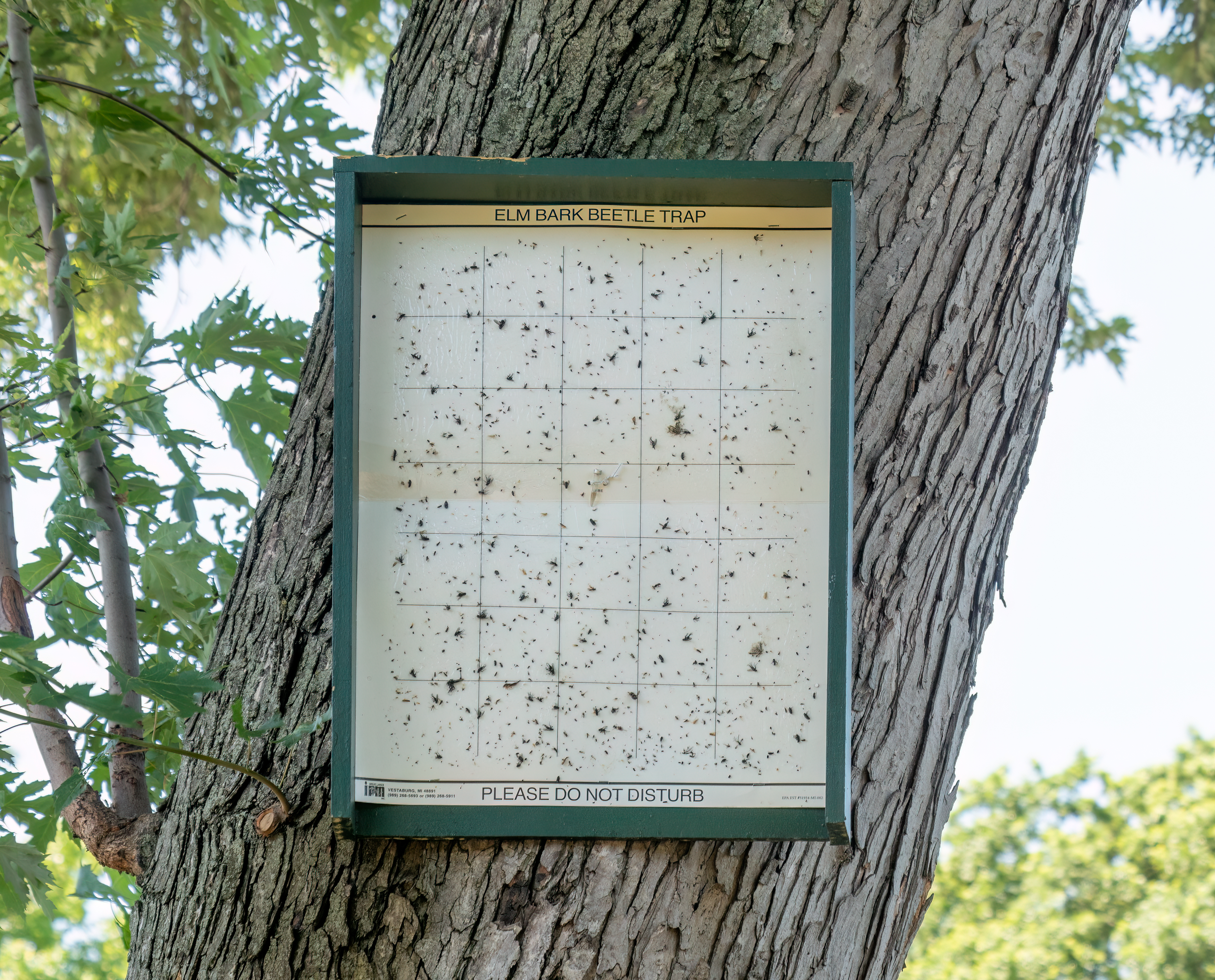
Elm bark beetle trap on an elm tree

Hylurgopinus rufipes, the native elm bark beetle, is a species of elm bark beetles in the tribe Hylesinini (crenulate bark beetles). It is the only species in the genus Hylurgopinus. It is found in Canada and the United States. It is of particular importance as a vector of Dutch elm disease. It is brownish-red in color and its size ranges from 2.34 mm to 2.9 mm.
