= Sporothrix brasiliensis =

Scientific classification
- Kingdom: Fungi
- Division: Ascomycota
- Class: Sordariomycetes
- Order: Ophiostomatales
- Family: Ophiostomataceae
- Genus: Sporothrix
- Species: S. brasiliensis

Binomial name
- Sporothrix brasiliensis Marimon, Gené, Cano & Guarro (2007)

Species of fungus

Sporothrix brasiliensis is a fungus that is commonly found in soil. It is an emerging fungal pathogen that is causing disease in humans and cats mainly in Brazil and other countries in South America.

Similar to other species in Sporothrix genus, this fungus causes the disease sporotrichosis. However, it has been observed that more severe disease results from infection by Sporothrix brasiliensis compared to other species. The fungus is a thermally dimorphic fungus as it is found in the mycelium phase at room temperature and as yeast in the warmer temperatures of host bodies.

== Morphology ==
The two morphologies displayed by Sporothrix brasiliensis are a hyphal form which occurs in the environment and a yeast form which occurs at higher temperatures (36–37 °C (97–99 °F)) such as within the bodies of mammals.

=== Hyphal phase ===
The hyphal form of S.brasiliensis occurs at room temperature. Melaninization level of the hyphal form can vary from light (albino) to dark (pigmented) phenotypes. Sympodial conidia are obovoid shaped with a glassy (hyaline) appearance while sessile conidia are dark colored and globose.

=== Yeast phase ===
The yeast form of S.brasiliensis occurs at higher temperatures. Micro-morphologically the yeast takes the shape of an elongated cigar.

== Habitat and ecology ==
S.brasiliensis is commonly found in the soil and is saprophytic in its mycelium phase. The main vector of the pathogen is thought to be cats which spread the fungus through bites and scratches as well as lesions found on the bodies of cats. It is believed that the origin of the pathogen comes from the ingestion of rats by cats where it zoonotically spread to humans.

== Epidemiology ==
Sporothrix brasiliensis was first described in the Southeastern region of Brazil and sporotrichosis caused by the fungus was endemic to the region prior to 1990. However disease has quickly spread to other parts of Brazil and neighboring countries in South America with reported cases in Argentina, Paraguay, Bolivia, Columbia and Panama. A review in 2015 reported that of 5,814 cases of sporotrichosis in Brazil, 88% of cases were caused by S.brasiliensis. The fungus has been isolated from intestinal and feline fecal samples which suggest that feces from infected cats may contaminate soil and contribute to the spread of the disease.

== Sporotrichosis ==
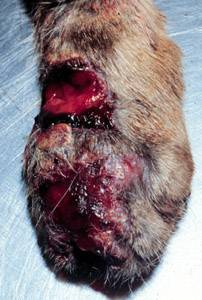
Cutaneous lesions caused by sporotrichosis on cat's paw

Sporotrichosis is traditionally associated with subcutaneous exposure of Sporothrix propagules typically through minor injury while coming in contact with plants, soil, or organic matter. However zoonotic transmission through cats mainly through scratching, biting, or coming in contact with skin lesions has been the main mode of transmission for S.brasiliensis, constituting the current epidemic in South America. While cutaneous infection is most common, pulmonary sporotrichosis from inhaling conidia, and disseminated sporotrichosis can also occur, primarily in individuals who are immunocompromised. It is believed that S.brasiliensis is more virulent than other species that cause sporotrichosis like S.schenckii and results in larger, longer lasting lesion with a higher degree of local and systemic inflammation as demonstrated on mice. A report in May 2020 reported a fatal case of pulmonary sporotrichosis caused by S.brasiliensis in a patient with no history of skin trauma or immunocompromise further supporting the notion of increased fungal virulence in S.brasiliensis relative to S.schenckii.

=== Treatment ===
Sporotrichosis caused by S.brasiliensis is difficult to treat due to resistance to main antifungal therapies. Current treatment recommendations for both felines and humans mainly include the antifungal drug itraconazole. Alternative therapies include the use of terbinafine and potassium iodine for cutaneous infection, and amphotericin B for severe pulmonary and disseminated forms of infection.

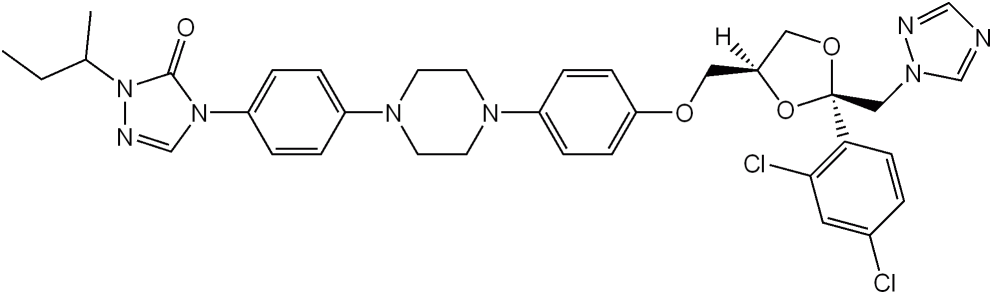
Structure of itraconazole

=== Issues with treatment ===
While itraconazole has shown moderate effectiveness against S.brasiliensis, strains of the fungus that display resistance against the drug have been documented. In addition, the treatment of felines is particularly difficult as care requires prolonged intervals of time daily and many cats fail to respond well to therapies. As such abandonment of treatments is frequent and typically occurs with the observed healing of skin lesions. Due to this the recurrence of disease can typically occur with higher severity while increasing the chances of antifungal resistance strain development. Failure to complete treatment regimens also contributes to the continued spread of the disease to other cats and humans.
