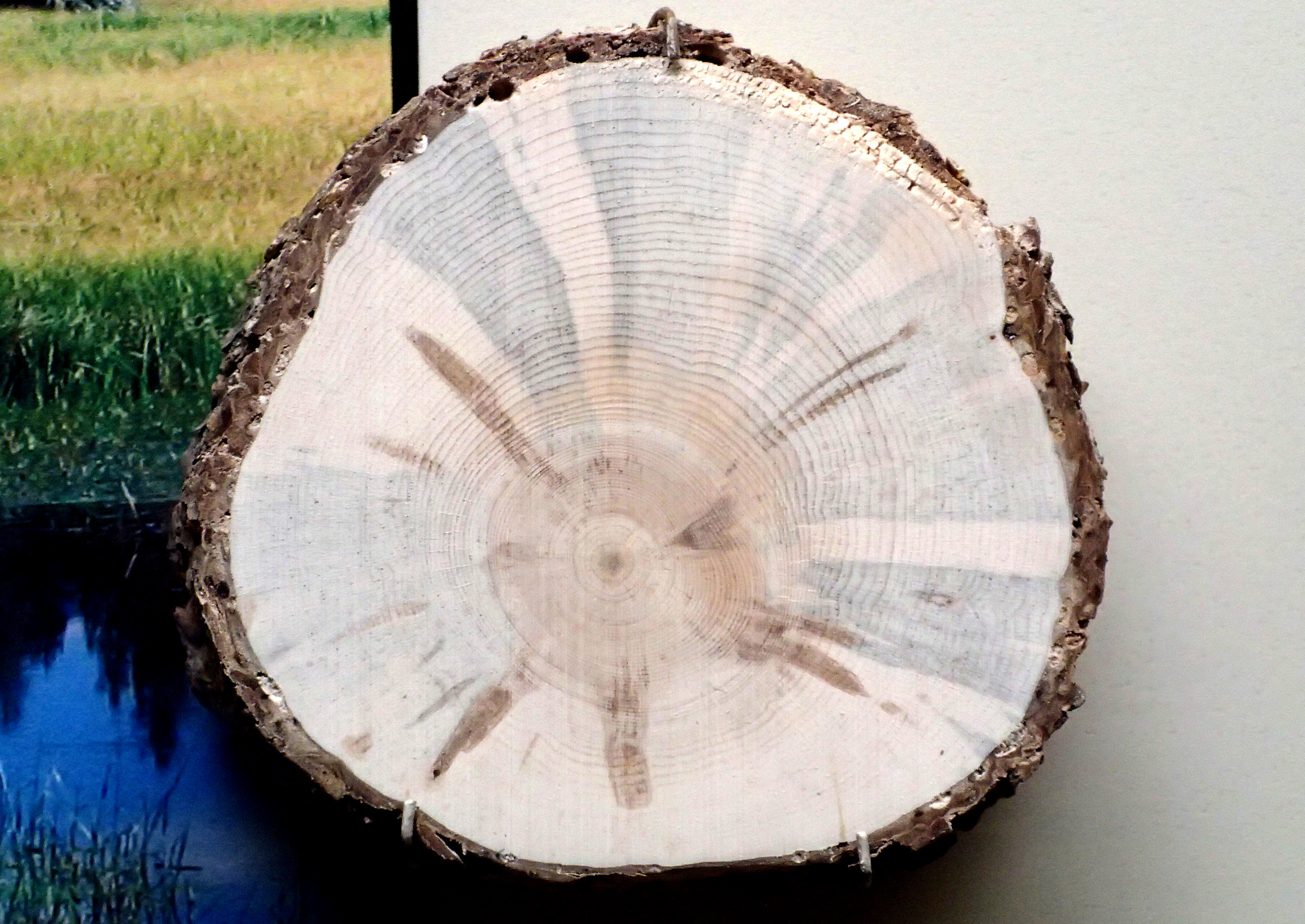

Scientific classification
- Kingdom: Fungi
- Division: Ascomycota
- Class: Sordariomycetes
- Order: Ophiostomatales
- Family: Ophiostomataceae
- Genus: Grosmannia
- Species: G. clavigera

Binomial name
- Grosmannia clavigera (Robinson-Jeffrey & R.W.Davidson) Zipfel, Z.W.de Beer & M.J.Wingf. (2006)

Synonyms
- Europhium clavigerum Rob.-Jeffr. & R.W. Davidson (1968); Ceratocystis clavigera (Rob.-Jeffr. & R.W.Davidson) H.P.Upadhyay (1981); Ophiostoma clavigerum (Rob.-Jeffr. & R.W.Davidson) T.C.Harr. (1987)

= Grosmannia clavigera =

Species of fungus

Grosmannia clavigera is a species of sac fungus that causes blue stain in wood. It spreads to lodgepole pine, ponderosa pine, Douglas-fir, and whitebark pine trees from the body and a special structure in the heads of mountain pine beetles. The blue stain fungus has evolved a relationship with mountain pine beetles that allow them to travel from tree to tree on a special structure in the beetle's heads and stops the tree from producing resin to pitch out or kill the beetle, encouraging the pine beetle infestation occurring all along the Rocky Mountains from Mexico into Canada. The beetles are able to mine and lay eggs while avoiding the tree's defenses. The 33 Mb genome of this fungus was sequenced in 2009.

Although previously considered to be asexual, C. clavigera appears to have the potential to reproduce sexually as indicated by the presence of mating type loci in the genome.
