= Esteya =

Scientific classification
- Kingdom: Fungi
- Division: Ascomycota
- Class: Sordariomycetes
- Order: Ophiostomatales
- Family: Ophiostomataceae
- Genus: Esteya; J.Y.Liou, J.Y.Shih & Tzean, 1999

Type species
- Esteya vermicola J.Y.Liou, J.Y.Shih & Tzean

Genus of fungi

Esteya is a genus of nematophagous fungi in the order Ophiostomatales, notable for their ability to parasitize and kill nematodes, particularly the pinewood nematode, Bursaphelenchus xylophilus—a major pest in forestry and causal agent of pine wilt disease. The genus belongs to the family Ophiostomataceae and includes two species, E. vermicola and E. floridanum.

== Distribution ==
Esteya vermicola is a cosmopolitan species that was reported in Brazil, China, the Czech Republic, Italy, Japan, South Korea, and Taiwan. Esteya floridanum was isolated in the United States of America.

== Morphology and life cycle ==
Macroscopically, E. vermicola colonies appear greyish-green to dark-green and reverse dark-grey to olive-green after being cultured for 7 days on rich media, although slight variations have also been observed: grayish-blue with slight white on the surface and reverse dark-grey to chartreuse, white at first, gradually turning grayish-green and dark-green with dark-brown pigments.

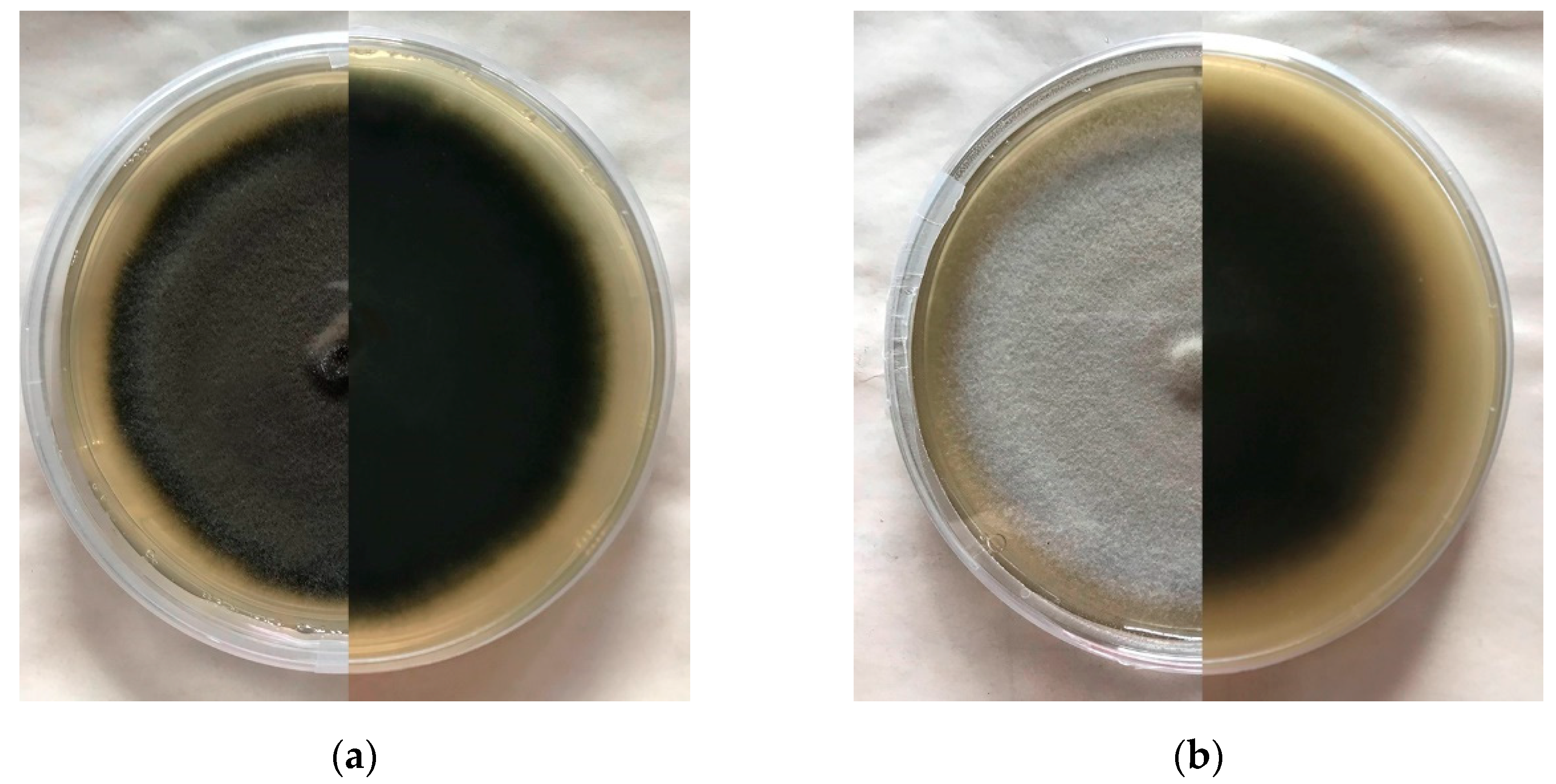
Upper and reverse perspectives of Esteya species cultured on potato dextrose agar: (a) E. vermicola; (b) E. floridanum.

In similar conditions, E. floridanum colonies appear initially white, turning light-grey after 5 days, and reverse initially white, switching to dark-brown on potato dextrose agar and beige on malt extract agar.

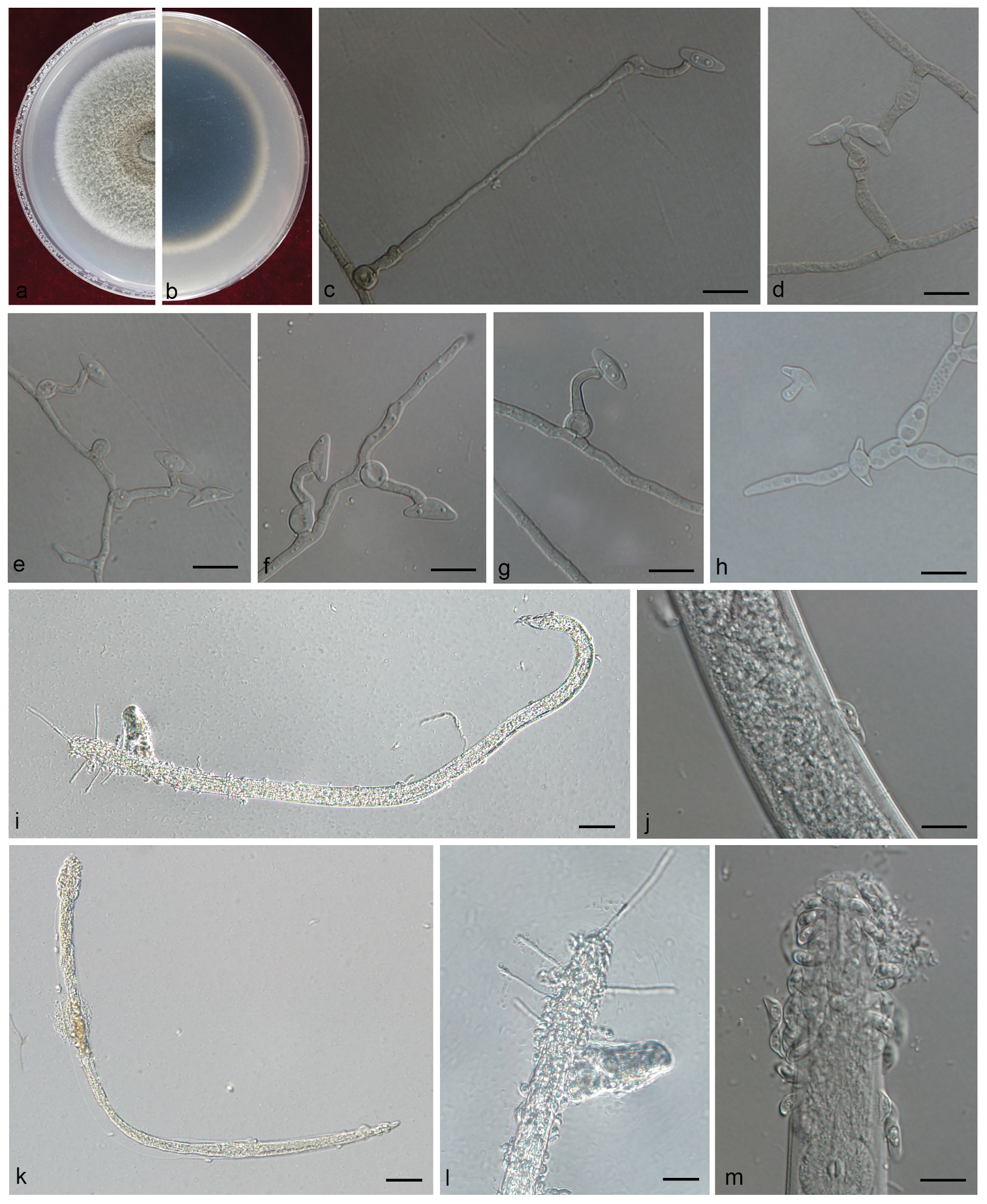
Esteya vermicola

Species in the Esteya genus are characterized by the production of lunate conidia (asexual spores), distinctive adhesive structures that attach to nematodes and play a role in the infective cycle. After adhesion, the conidia usually germinate within 18–24 h, killing the nematode when organs and tissues are destroyed by a mass of hyphae, and producing more lunate conidia to begin the cycle anew.

== Phylogenetics ==
Esteya species have frequently been isolated from insects. Molecular evidence reveals a close evolutionary relationship with insect-associated fungi, particularly ambrosial fungi from the Raffaelea sulphurea complex, recently reclassified as Dryadomyces. Esteya species also cluster phylogenetically with other ophiostomatoid fungi, some of which are part of the pine wilt disease system.

== Ecology ==
Considering their close association with insects, Esteya species likely play an important role in coniferous ecosystems by potentially regulating pinewood nematode populations. Furthermore, despite their slow-growing nature, they were found to be able to compete with fungi occurring in the pathosystem of pine wilt disease under controlled conditions. This knowledge directly impacts biocontrol strategies, as competition with other microorganisms could hinder the establishment of Estraya species within symptomatic pine trees.

== Biocontrol potential ==
Due to its specificity and effectiveness against B. xylophilus, E. vermicola has been investigated as a biological control agent. It can be applied both prophylactically and to infected pine trees, and research has demonstrated its ability to suppress nematode populations and reduce disease severity under laboratory and semi-natural conditions.

A 2026 greenhouse study in Pinus pinaster found that pre-emptive inoculation with E. vermicola or E. floridanum significantly reduced Bursaphelenchus xylophilus reproduction relative to the inoculated control. However, these reductions were not consistently accompanied by improvements in symptom severity, disease progression, or survival.

== Research and applications ==
The genome of E. vermicola has been sequenced, offering insights into its pathogenic mechanisms against nematodes. Its dual lifestyle—as both an endophyte in trees and a parasite of nematodes—makes it a subject of interest in fungal ecology, plant pathology, and sustainable pest management, especially against B. xylophilus. Ongoing research is focused on improving its formulation, delivery, and field deployment.
