= Ophiostoma breviusculum =

Scientific classification
- Kingdom: Fungi
- Division: Ascomycota
- Class: Sordariomycetes
- Order: Ophiostomatales
- Family: Ophiostomataceae
- Genus: Ophiostoma
- Species: O. breviusculum

Binomial name
- Ophiostoma breviusculum W.Hsin Chung, Yamaoka, Uzunovic & J.J. Kim (2007)

Species of fungus

Ophiostoma breviusculum is a species of fungus in the family Ophiostomataceae, associated with bark beetles infesting larch in Japan. It belongs in the Ophiostoma piceae complex. It was also found in insect galleries of Larix kaempferi. The length of its perithecial necks and synnemata are shorter than in O. piceae. The synnemata also differ from the latter morphologically.
