= Blue stain fungi =

Name for several species of fungus

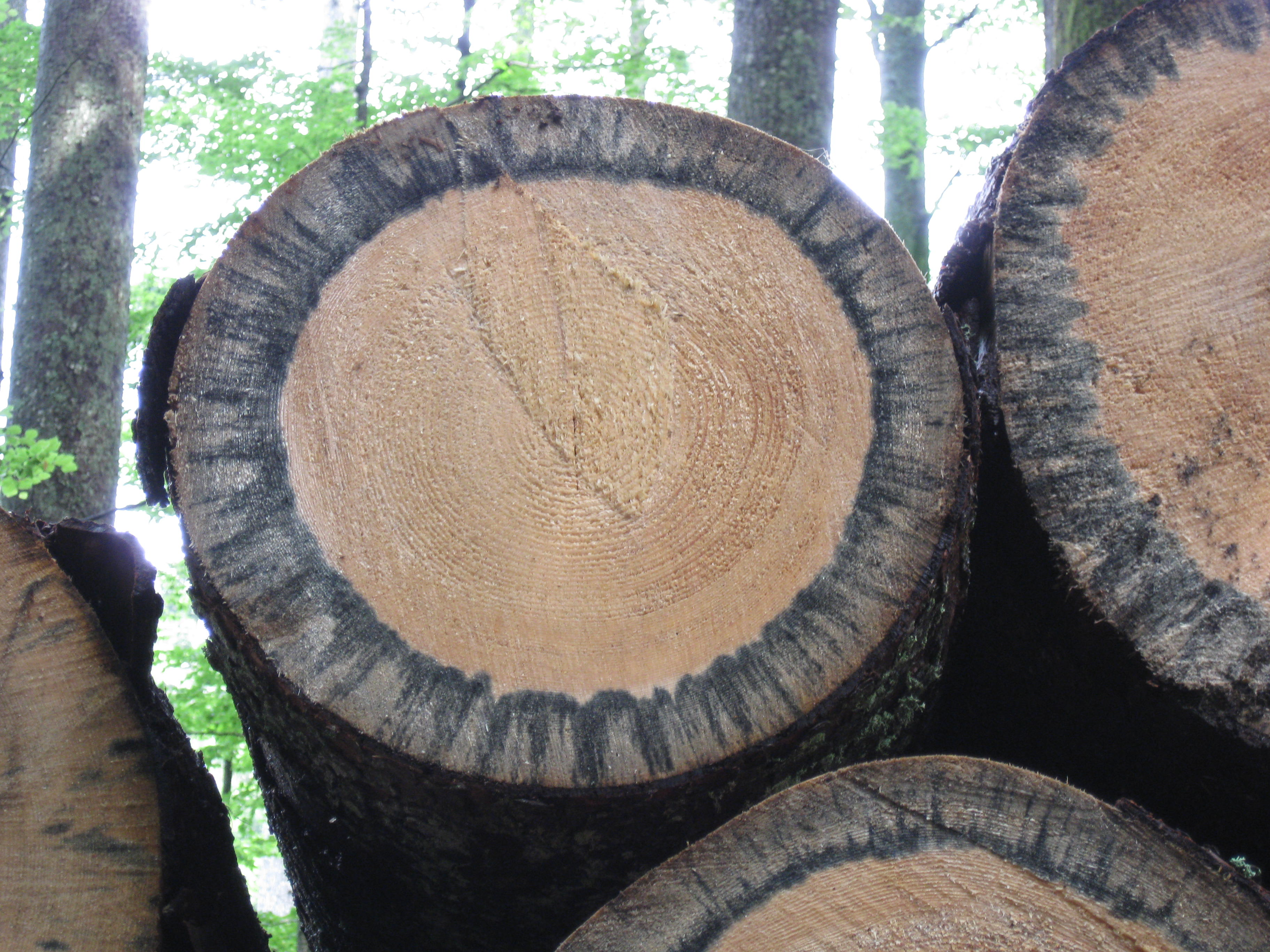
Sap stain fungi on logs in the Bavarian Forest National Park.

Blue stain fungi (also known as sap stain fungi) is a vague term including various fungi that cause dark staining in sapwood. The staining is most often blue, but could also be grey or black. Because the grouping is based solely on symptomatics, it is not a monophyletic grouping.

== Included species ==
Depending on the author, the group can include between 100 and 250 species of ascomycetes and so-called deuteromycetes. They are usually divided into three different groups:

1. Ascomycete fungi from the genera Ceratocystis, Ophiostoma, Ceratocystiopsis, Grosmannia. These are usually transmitted between trees by bark beetles of the subfamily Scolytinae.
2. Several black yeasts including Hormonema dematioides, Aureobasidium pullulans, Rhinocladiella atrovirens, and Phialophora species.
3. Several dark molds such as Alternaria alternata, Cladosporium sphaerospermum and C. cladosporioides.

Importance of the symbiotic relationship between blue stain fungi and bark beetles.

Symbiotic association between bark beetles and species of blue stain fungi is a well-known and studied phenomenon in the forestry pathology. Some bark beetle species like Mountain Pine Beetle (Dendroctonus ponderosae) feed on phloem layer just underneath the bark of a lodgepole pines when they are developing from larval to adult stage. Mountain Pine Beetle carry the spores of at least 2 known blue stain fungi species, Ophiostoma clavigerum and Ophiostoma montium. These spores are carried on the exoskeleton of the beetles from one tree to another and aid the insects in overcoming defence mechanisms of different pine species. After the beetles initiate their attack and bore through the bark spores are released. These spores immediately start to multiply and block important conductive vessels within the tree tissues. The tree loses its ability to produce resin and to defend itself.

Trade and pulp production problems associated with blue stain fungi

Developing spores of the blue stain fungi are a concern in packaging materials used for shipping from Canada to Australia due to the potential risk of introducing invasive species of fungi.

According to Pulp and Paper Research Institute of Canada the wood infected with the blue stain fungus have a high proportion of fines that are not suitable for pulp production.

== Economic importance ==
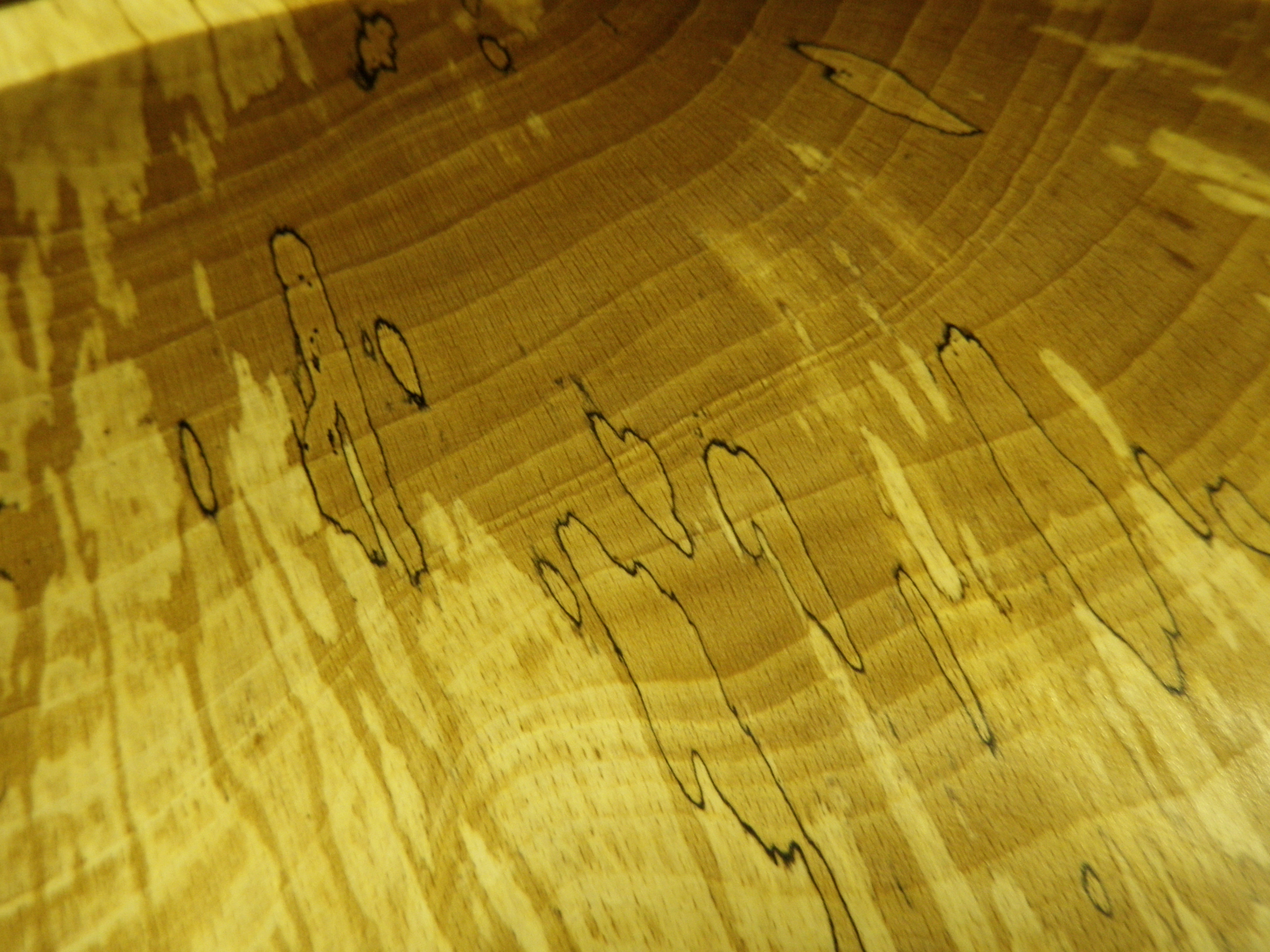
Spalting in beech

The major economic damage caused by the blue stain fungi is aesthetic because of the usually undesirable discoloration of wood. Blue stain fungi do not affect the strength of wood. In some cases the staining is desirable in fine wood crafting applications where it is called spalting.
