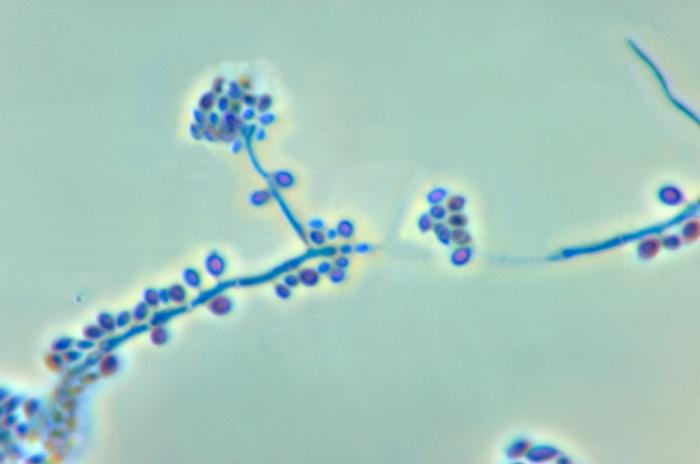
- Conidiophores and conidia of Sporothrix schenckii

Scientific classification
- Domain: Eukaryota
- Kingdom: Fungi
- Division: Ascomycota
- Class: Sordariomycetes
- Order: Ophiostomatales
- Family: Ophiostomataceae
- Genus: Sporothrix; Hektoen & C.F.Perkins, (1900)

Type species
- Sporothrix schenckii Hektoen & C.F.Perkins, (1900)

= Sporothrix =

Genus of fungi

Sporothrix is a ubiquitous genus of soil-dwelling fungus discovered by Schenck in 1898, and studied in more detail by Hektoen and Perkins. The first described and best known species is Sporothrix schenckii, the causative agent of rose handler's disease. New environmental, and pathogenic, species have been discovered with the potential for more to be found as molecular techniques advance.

Other species in this genus include Sporothrix brasiliensis and Sporothrix globosa.

== Species ==
As accepted by Species Fungorum;

- Sporothrix abietina (Marm. & Butin) Z.W. de Beer, T.A. Duong & M.J. Wingf. (2016)
- Sporothrix aemulophila Musvuugwa, Z.W. de Beer, Dreyer & Roets (2015)
- Sporothrix africana G.J. Marais & M.J. Wingf. (2001)
- Sporothrix alba (Petch) de Hoog (1974)
- Sporothrix albicans S.B. Saksena (1965)
- Sporothrix ankangensis M.Z. Fan, C. Guo & T.Y. Zhang (1990)
- Sporothrix aurorae (X.D. Zhou & M.J. Wingf.) Z.W. de Beer, T.A. Duong & M.J. Wingf. (2016)
- Sporothrix bragantina (Pfenning & Oberw.) Z.W. de Beer, T.A. Duong & M.J. Wingf. (2016)
- Sporothrix brasiliensis Marimon, Gené, Cano & Guarro (2007)
- Sporothrix brunneoviolacea Madrid, Gené, Cano & Guarro (2010)
- Sporothrix cabralii Errasti & Z.W. de Beer (2016)
- Sporothrix candida (Kamgan, Jol. Roux & Z.W. de Beer) Z.W. de Beer, T.A. Duong & M.J. Wingf. (2016)
- Sporothrix cantabriensis (Romón, Z.W. De Beer & M.J. Wingf.) Z.W. de Beer, T.A. Duong & M.J. Wingf. (2016)
- Sporothrix catenata de Hoog & Constant. (1981)
- Sporothrix cavum R. Jankowiak (2021)
- Sporothrix chilensis A.M. Rodrigues, Choappa, G.F. Fernandes, de Hoog & Z.P. de Camargo (2015)
- Sporothrix chondracris B. Huang, M.Z. Fan & Z.Z. Li (1997)
- Sporothrix cracoviensis R. Jankowiak (2021)
- Sporothrix cryptarchum R. Jankowiak & A. Ostafińska (2021)
- Sporothrix curviconia de Hoog (1974)
- Sporothrix cylindrospora Hol.-Jech. (1980)
- Sporothrix dentifunda (Aghayeva & M.J. Wingf.) Z.W. de Beer, T.A. Duong & M.J. Wingf. (2016)
- Sporothrix dimorphospora (Roxon & S.C. Jong) Madrid, Gené, Cano & Guarro (2010)
- Sporothrix dombeyi Z.W. de Beer, T.A. Duong & M.J. Wingf. (2016)
- Sporothrix echinospora (Deighton & Piroz.) Katum. (1987)
- Sporothrix epigloea (Guerrero) Z.W. de Beer, T.A. Duong & M.J. Wingf. (2016)
- Sporothrix eucalyptigena (P.A. Barber & Crous) Z.W. de Beer, T.A. Duong & M.J. Wingf. (2016)
- Sporothrix eucastaneae (R.W. Davidson) Z.W. de Beer, T.A. Duong & M.J. Wingf. (2016)
- Sporothrix euskadiensis (Romón, Z.W. de Beer & M.J. Wingf.) Z.W. de Beer, T.A. Duong & M.J. Wingf. (2016)
- Sporothrix foliorum J.J. Taylor (1970)
- Sporothrix fraxini R. Jankowiak (2021)
- Sporothrix fumea (Kamgan, Jol. Roux & Z.W. de Beer) Z.W. de Beer, T.A. Duong & M.J. Wingf. (2016)
- Sporothrix fungorum de Hoog & G.A. de Vries (1973)
- Sporothrix fusiformis (Aghayeva & M.J. Wingf.) Z.W. de Beer, T.A. Duong & M.J. Wingf. (2016)
- Sporothrix ganodermatis Jing Z. Sun, Xing Z. Liu & K.D. Hyde (2019)
- Sporothrix gemella (Roets, Z.W. de Beer & Crous) Z.W. de Beer, T.A. Duong & M.J. Wingf. (2016)
- Sporothrix ghanensis de Hoog & H.C. Evans (1974)
- Sporothrix globosa Marimon, Cano, Gené, Deanna A. Sutton, H. Kawas. & Guarro (2007)
- Sporothrix globuligera K. Matsush. & Matsush. (1995)
- Sporothrix gossypina (R.W. Davidson) Z.W. de Beer, T.A. Duong & M.J. Wingf. (2016)
- Sporothrix guttuliformis de Hoog (1978)
- Sporothrix humicola de Mey., Z.W. de Beer & M.J. Wingf. (2008)
- Sporothrix hypoxyli W.J. Nel, Z.W. De Beer & T.A. Duong (2021)
- Sporothrix inflata de Hoog (1974)
- Sporothrix insectorum de Hoog & H.C. Evans (1974)
- Sporothrix inusitatiramosa H.Z. Kong (1991)
- Sporothrix isarioides (Petch) de Hoog (1974)
- Sporothrix itsvo Musvuugwa, Dreyer & Roets (2016)
- Sporothrix lunata (Aghayeva & M.J. Wingf.) Z.W. de Beer, T.A. Duong & M.J. Wingf. (2016)
- Sporothrix luriei (Ajello & Kaplan) Marimon, Gené, Cano & Guarro (2008)
- Sporothrix macroconidia H.M. Wang, Q. Lu & Zhen Zhang (2019)
- Sporothrix mexicana Marimon, Gené, Cano & Guarro (2007)
- Sporothrix narcissi (Limber) Z.W. de Beer, T.A. Duong & M.J. Wingf. (2016)
- Sporothrix nebularis (Romón, Z.W. de Beer & M.J. Wingf.) Z.W. de Beer, T.A. Duong & M.J. Wingf. (2016)
- Sporothrix nivea Kreisel & Schaver (1985)
- Sporothrix nothofagi Gadgil & M.A. Dick (2004)
- Sporothrix nsini Ngubane, Dreyer, Oberl. & Roets (2017)
- Sporothrix oleae Musvuugwa, L.L. Dreyer & F. Roets (2020)
- Sporothrix pallida (Tubaki) Matsush. (1975)
- Sporothrix palmiculminata (Roets, Z.W. de Beer & M.J. Wingf.) Z.W. de Beer, T.A. Duong & M.J. Wingf. (2016)
- Sporothrix phasma (Roets, Z.W. de Beer & M.J. Wingf.) Z.W. de Beer, T.A. Duong & M.J. Wingf. (2016)
- Sporothrix phellini G.R.W. Arnold (1987)
- Sporothrix polyporicola (Constant. & Ryman) Z.W. de Beer, T.A. Duong & M.J. Wingf. (2016)
- Sporothrix prolifera (T. Kowalski & Butin) Z.W. de Beer, T.A. Duong & M.J. Wingf. (2016)
- Sporothrix protearum G.J. Marais & M.J. Wingf. (1997)
- Sporothrix protea-sedis (Roets, M.J. Wingf. & Z.W. de Beer) Z.W. de Beer, T.A. Duong & M.J. Wingf. (2016)
- Sporothrix pseudoabietina H.M. Wang, Q. Lu & Zhen Zhang (2019)
- Sporothrix ramosissima G. Arnaud ex de Hoog (1974)
- Sporothrix ranii Moustafa (1981)
- Sporothrix rapaneae Musvuugwa, Dreyer & Roets (2016)
- Sporothrix resoviensis R. Jankowiak & A. Ostafińska (2021)
- Sporothrix roboris (Georgescu & Teodoru) Grobbel., Z.W. de Beer & M.J. Wingf. (2009)
- Sporothrix rossii Z.W. de Beer, T.A. Duong & M.J. Wingf. (2016)
- Sporothrix schenckii Hektoen & C.F. Perkins (1900)
- Sporothrix sclerotialis de Hoog (1978)
- Sporothrix setiphila (Deighton & Piroz.) de Hoog (1974)
- Sporothrix smangaliso Ngubane, Dreyer, Oberl. & Roets (2017)
- Sporothrix splendens G.J. Marais & M.J. Wingf. (1994)
- Sporothrix stenoceras (Robak) Z.W. de Beer, T.A. Duong & M.J. Wingf. (2016)
- Sporothrix stylites de Mey., Z.W. de Beer & M.J. Wingf. (2008)
- Sporothrix subannulata Livingston & R.W. Davidson (1987)
- Sporothrix tardilutea K. Matsush. & Matsush. (1996)
- Sporothrix thermara (J.A. van der Linde, Z.W. de Beer & Jol. Roux) Z.W. de Beer, T.A. Duong & M.J. Wingf. (2016)
- Sporothrix tuberi A. Fontana & Fas.-Bonf. (1971)
- Sporothrix undulata R. Jankowiak & A. Ostafińska (2021)
- Sporothrix uta Dreyer & Roets (2016)
- Sporothrix variecibata Roets, Z.W. de Beer & Crous (2008)
- Sporothrix villosa R.L. Chang & X.Y. Zhang (2021)
- Sporothrix vizei (Berk. & Broome) de Hoog (1978)
- Sporothrix zambiensis (Roets, M.J. Wingf. & Z.W. de Beer) Z.W. de Beer, T.A. Duong & M.J. Wingf. (2016)
