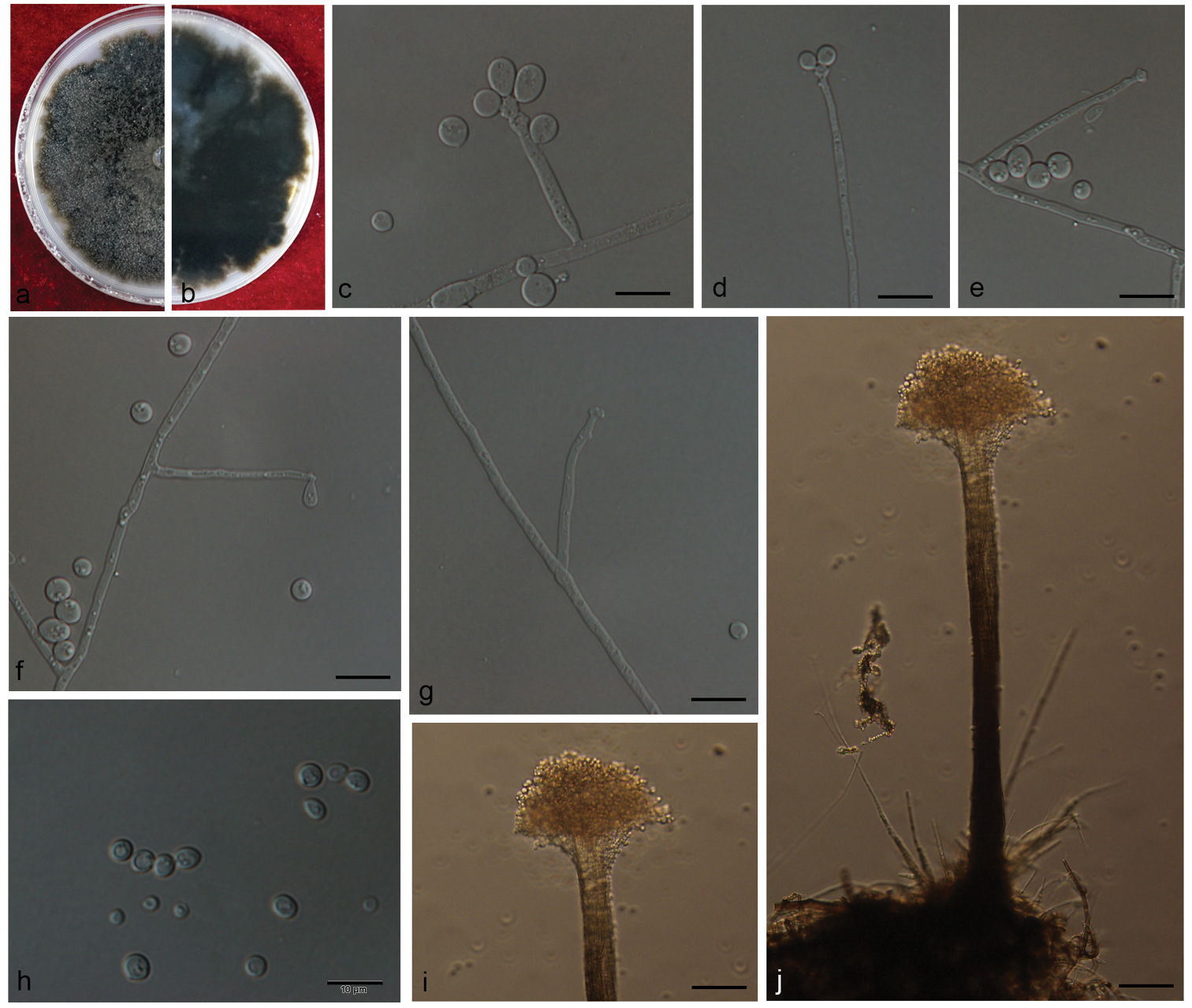

Scientific classification
- Kingdom: Fungi
- Division: Ascomycota
- Class: Sordariomycetes
- Order: Ophiostomatales
- Family: Ophiostomataceae
- Genus: Ophiostoma
- Species: O. tingens

Binomial name
- Ophiostoma tingens (Lagerb & Melin) de Beer & Wingfield. 2013

= Ophiostoma tingens =

Species of fungus

Ophiostoma tingens is a species of blue-stain fungus from the family Ophiostomataceae. It is associated with bark beetles and can be found on the sapwood of pine trees. The fungus can produce blue to dark discoloration of wood.

== Ecology ==
The larvae of the lesser pine shoot beetle (Tomicus minor) feed on O. tingens.

== Taxonomy ==
The species was first described in 1927 as Trichosporum tingens. The species was reclassified to its current nomenclature in 2013.
