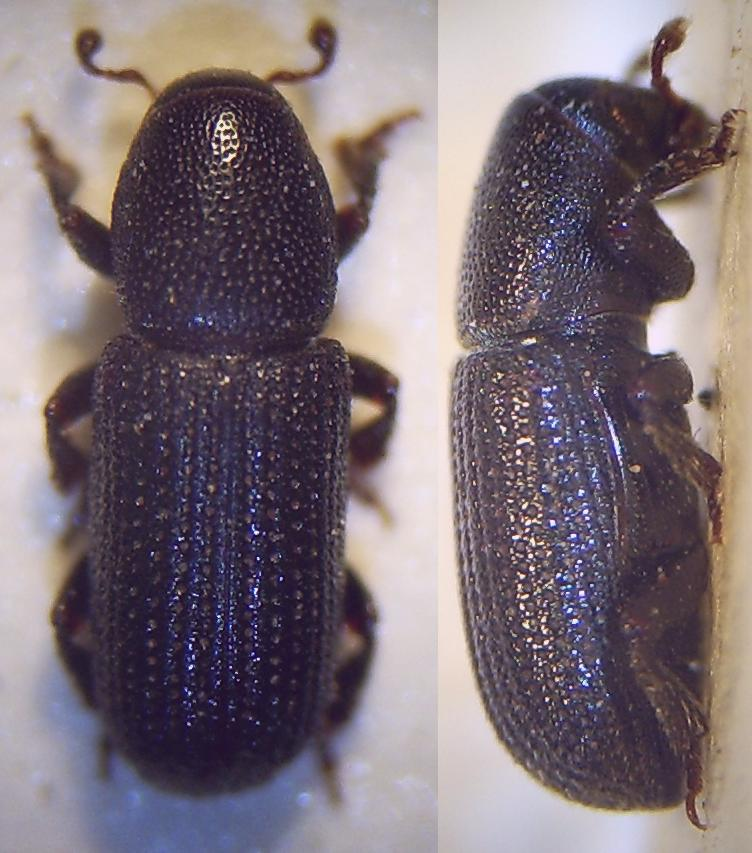
- Hylastes ater
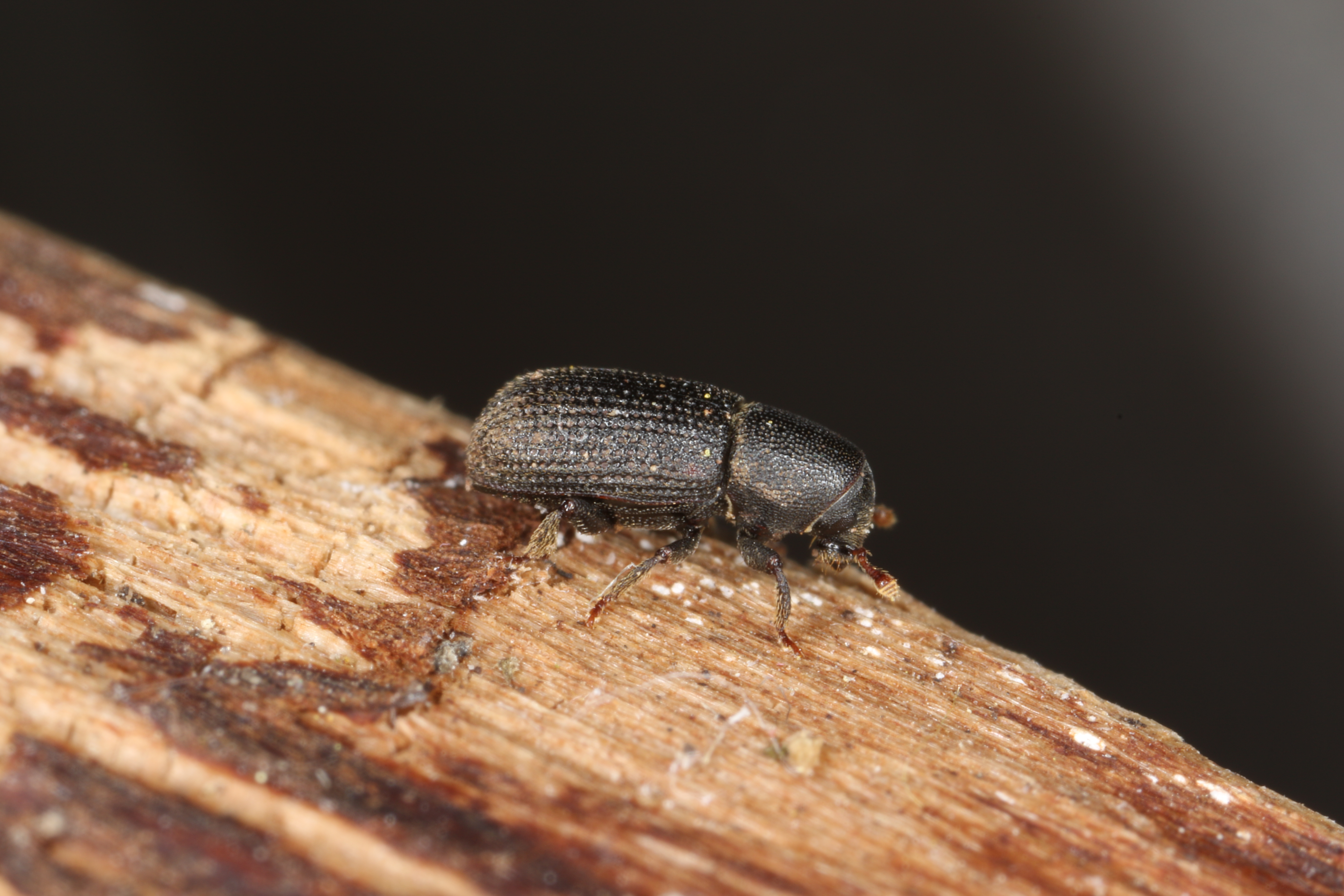
- Hylastes opacus

Scientific classification
- Kingdom: Animalia
- Phylum: Arthropoda
- Clade: Pancrustacea
- Class: Insecta
- Order: Coleoptera
- Suborder: Polyphaga
- Infraorder: Cucujiformia
- Superfamily: Curculionoidea
- Family: Curculionidae
- Tribe: Hylesinini
- Genus: Hylastes; Erichson, 1836

= Hylastes =

Genus of beetles

Hylastes is a genus of crenulate bark beetles in the family Curculionidae.

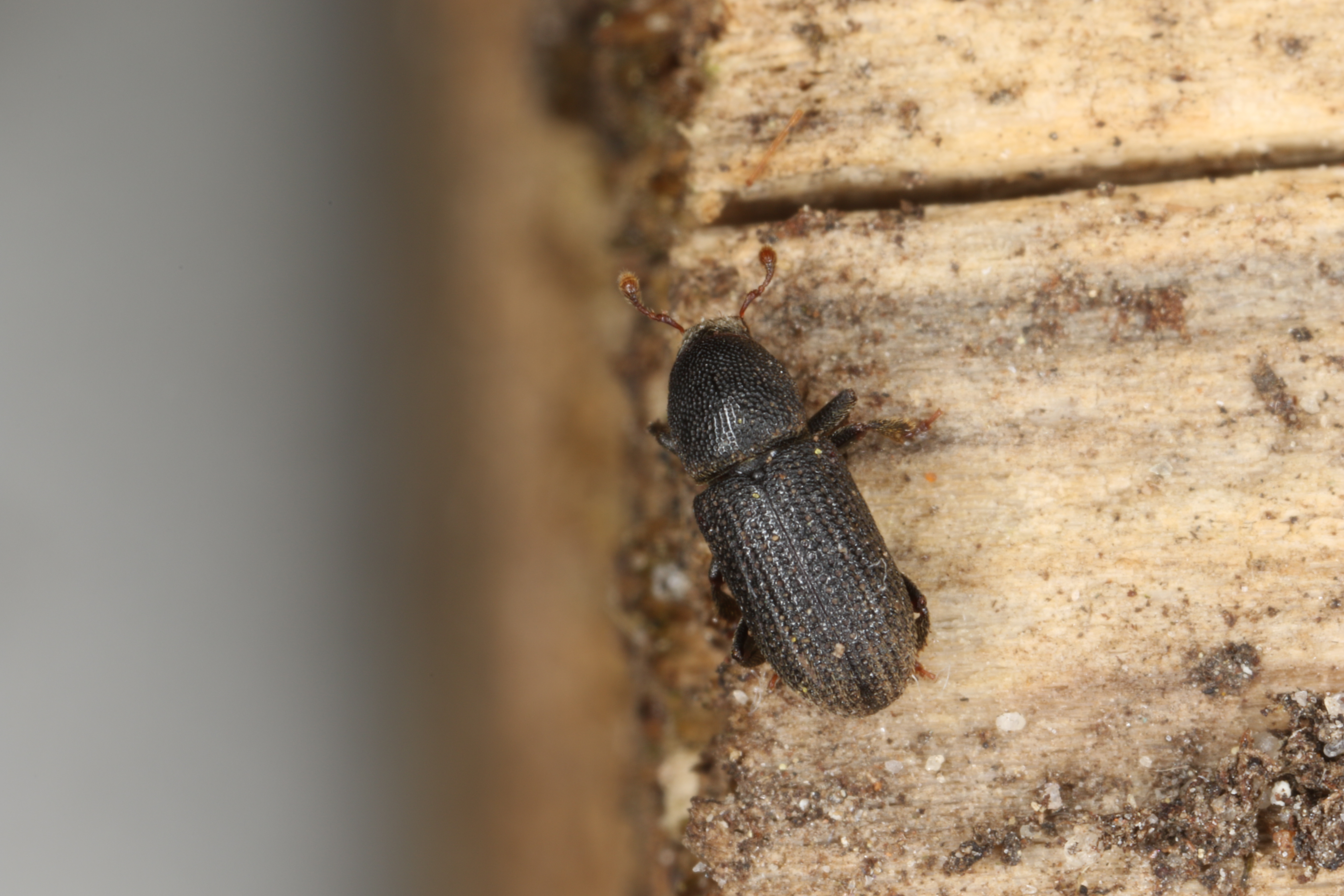
Hylastes opacus

== Ecology ==
Hylastes is one of the most common genus of bark beetle observed in loblolly pine (Pinus taeda). Members of this genus are potentially vectors (primarily Hylastes nigrinus) for fungal species of the genus Leptographium (L. terebrantis and L. serpens). They allow for these fungi to spread into the roots of the loblolly pine trees causing high rates of mortality. This is currently considered an emerging forest health issue in the southeastern region of the United States.

== Evolutionary history ==
There have been fossilized evidence of bark beetles originateing during the early Cretaceous period. Hylastes perkovskyi is an extinct species that was found in Rovno amber. This discovery of this species suggest that Hylastes evolved during the Eocene epoch.

== Species ==
There are currently more than 90 species that belong to the genus Hylastes:

- Hylastes alni Niisima, 1909
- Hylastes alternans Chapuis, 1869
- Hylastes ambiguus Blandford, 1894c
- Hylastes americanus Wickham & H.F., 1913
- Hylastes anatolicus Pfeffer (Knízek & Pfeffer in), 1994c
- Hylastes angustatus (Herbst & J.F.W., 1793)
- Hylastes angusticollis Eggers, 1929c
- Hylastes asper Swaine & J.M., 1917
- Hylastes asperatus Wood, 1975
- Hylastes ater Erichson, 1836
- Hylastes aterites Schedl, 1947
- Hylastes aterrimus Eggers
- Hylastes attenuatus Erichson, 1836
- Hylastes batnensis Brisout & C., 1883
- Hylastes bonvouloiri Chapuis, 1869
- Hylastes brunneus Erichson, 1836
- Hylastes canadensis Blackman, 1941
- Hylastes carbonarius Fitch, 1858
- Hylastes clavus Wollaston, 1854
- Hylastes contractus Chapuis, 1869
- Hylastes corticiperda Erichson, 1836
- Hylastes cristatus Mannerheim, 1853
- Hylastes criticus Eichhoff, 1868c
- Hylastes cunicularius Erichson, 1836
- Hylastes exilis Chapuis, 1869
- Hylastes fallax Wichmann & H.E., 1911a
- Hylastes flavicornis Lindberg & Har., 1950
- Hylastes flohri Wood, 1966b
- Hylastes fulgidus Blackman, 1941
- Hylastes gergeri Eggers, 1911a
- Hylastes gracilis LeConte, 1868
- Hylastes granosus Chapuis, 1869
- Hylastes granulatus LeConte, 1868
- Hylastes graphus Letzner (Duftschmidt in), 1891
- Hylastes himalabietis Beeson, 1961
- Hylastes himalayensis Stebbing & E.P., 1909
- Hylastes humilis Blanchard, 1851
- Hylastes imitator Reitter, 1900
- Hylastes incomptus Blandford, 1897a
- Hylastes interstitialis Chapuis, 1875
- Hylastes lifuanus Fauvel, 1872
- Hylastes linearis Erichson, 1836
- Hylastes longicollis Swaine, 1918
- Hylastes longifoliae Stebbing & E.P., 1908b
- Hylastes longipennis Blandford
- Hylastes longipilus Reitter, 1894a
- Hylastes longus Leconte, 1876
- Hylastes lowei Paiva, 1861b
- Hylastes macer LeConte, 1868 (root-feeding bark beetle)
- Hylastes mexicanus Wood, 1967
- Hylastes minutus Blackman, 1941
- Hylastes niger Wood, 1974a
- Hylastes nigrinus LeConte, 1868 (Douglas fir root bark beetle)
- Hylastes nitidus Swaine & J.M., 1917
- Hylastes obscurus Chapuis, 1875
- Hylastes opacus Erichson, 1836
- Hylastes parallelus Chapuis, 1875
- Hylastes parvus Blackman, 1941
- Hylastes peregrinus Chapuis, 1869
- †Hylastes perkovskyi
- Hylastes piceae Pfeffer, 1944b
- Hylastes pinicola Bedel, 1888b
- Hylastes planirostris Chapuis, 1869
- Hylastes plumbeus Blandford, 1894d
- Hylastes porculus Erichson, 1836
- Hylastes porosus LeConte, 1868
- Hylastes pumilus Mannerheim, 1843
- Hylastes pupillatus Hansen, V. (Eggers in), 1955
- Hylastes pusillus Blackman, 1941
- Hylastes retifer Wood, 1982a
- Hylastes rotundicollis Reitter, 1894a
- Hylastes ruber Swaine, 1915
- Hylastes rufipes Eichhoff, 1868c
- Hylastes salebrosus Eichhoff, 1868
- Hylastes scaber Swaine & J.M., 1917
- Hylastes scabripennis Zimmermann, 1868
- Hylastes scandinavieus Lekander, 1965b
- Hylastes scobinosus Eichhoff, 1868c
- Hylastes septentrionalis Eggers, 1923b
- Hylastes simplex Rey, 1892b
- Hylastes subalpinus Eggers, 1940h
- Hylastes subopacus Blackman, 1941
- Hylastes substriatus Strohmeyer & H
- Hylastes suspectus Bright, 1972d
- Hylastes swainei Eggers, 1934b
- Hylastes techangensis Tsai & Huang, 1964a
- Hylastes tenuis Eichhoff, 1868
- Hylastes variegatus Blandford, 1897a
- Hylastes variolosus Perris, 1852
- Hylastes vastans Chapuis, 1869
- Hylastes webbi Blackman, 1941
- Hylastes yukonis Fall, 1926
