= Spumatoria =

Scientific classification
- Kingdom: Fungi
- Division: Ascomycota
- Class: Sordariomycetes
- Order: Ophiostomatales
- Family: Ophiostomataceae
- Genus: Spumatoria; Massee & E.S.Salmon (1901)
- Species: S. longicollis

Binomial name
- Spumatoria longicollis Massee & E.S.Salmon (1901)

Genus of fungi

Spumatoria is a fungal genus in the family Ophiostomataceae. This is a monotypic genus, containing the single species Spumatoria longicollis.

It is scattered worldwide, found in parts of North America, northern parts of South America, Europe and the island of Tasmania.
