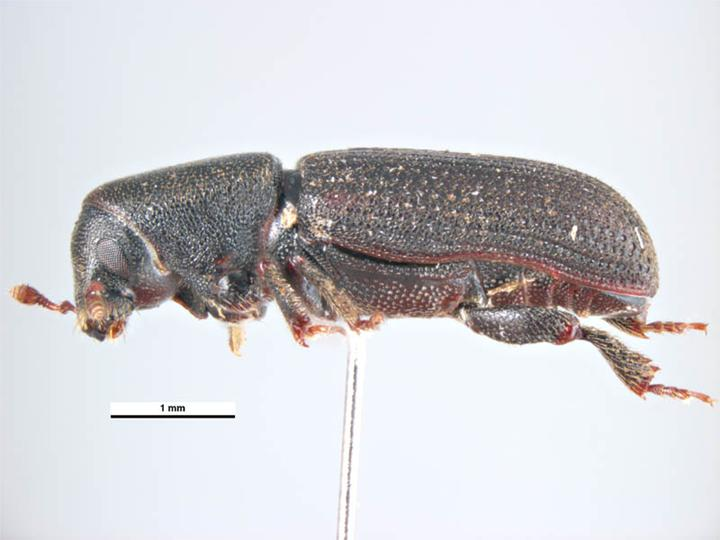

Scientific classification
- Kingdom: Animalia
- Phylum: Arthropoda
- Clade: Pancrustacea
- Class: Insecta
- Order: Coleoptera
- Suborder: Polyphaga
- Infraorder: Cucujiformia
- Superfamily: Curculionoidea
- Family: Curculionidae
- Genus: Hylastes
- Species: H. ater

Binomial name
- Hylastes ater Paykull, 1800

Synonyms
- Bostrichus ater Hylastes angusticollis Hylastes pinicola Hylesinus chloropus Ipsocossonus anomalus Tomicus pinicola

= Hylastes ater =

Species of beetle

Hylastes ater is a species of beetle in the family Curculionidae, the true weevils. It is a bark beetle, a member of the subfamily Scolytinae. Its common name is the black pine bark beetle.

== Distribution and habitation ==
It is native to Europe and parts of Asia, including China and Korea. It is known as an introduced species in many other regions, including Australia, New Zealand, the Americas, and South Africa. It is a pest of pines and other trees, and it is widespread in areas where pine trees are cultivated. The species "is an important threat to the biosecurity of all forested countries."

== Description ==
This beetle is cylindrical in shape and 3.5 to 5.5 millimeters long by about 1.4 millimeters wide. It is dark gray or shiny black with reddish antennae and legs. The newly hatched beetle is entirely reddish, and its color darkens over time. The elytra, the front of the face, and most of the prothorax are punctate. The head is bent downward, so just a small part is visible from above. The rostrum is short, not elongated into a typical weevil snout. The whitish egg is less than one millimeter long, and the larva is c-shaped, legless, and white with an amber-colored head capsule. The pupa is "mummy-like", yellowish-white, and spiny.

== Biology ==
This bark beetle feeds on the developing bark on and around the root crowns of tree seedlings, especially the phloem. It also infests stumps, logs, and fallen trees. It prefers pines, and is a widespread pest of wild and cultivated Monterey pines (Pinus radiata) in particular. Other recorded host trees include silver fir (Abies alba), colonial pine (Araucaria cunninghamii), Port Orford cedar (Chamaecyparis lawsoniana), common larch (Larix decidua), Sitka spruce (Picea sitchensis), Douglas-fir (Pseudotsuga menziesii), and coast redwood (Sequoia sempervirens).

The beetle reproduces in the inner bark layer of the tree. The female bores an egg gallery up to 13 centimeters in length along the surface of the wood, often parallel to the grain. The male clears the debris from the chamber. After mating, the female lays up to 100 eggs in the gallery, each in its own nook. The larvae usually develop over 8 to 10 weeks, but sometimes take well over a year to reach maturity, depending on temperature. As they grow, the egg gallery is obliterated and they develop together in a common chamber. Pupation lasts up to two weeks.

The adult beetle flies well and it can disperse to new areas in the search for appropriate tree hosts. It is attracted to volatiles released by the trees, such as β-pinene, a component of turpentine. During some parts of the year it may face competition from the red-haired bark beetle (Hylurgus ligniperda), which also reproduces in Monterey pines.

== As a pest ==
This beetle weakens and kills tree seedlings with its feeding and boring behaviors. It removes sections of bark from the base of the seedling, sometimes killing it. Surviving trees have resin-bleeding lesions and brittle needles and become wilted and discolored. Damage to the trees is increased when the beetle acts as a vector for sapstain fungi, introducing them into the wounds. These pigmented fungi discolor wood, producing cosmetic damage that makes it less marketable. This beetle can act as a vector for numerous species of sapstaining fungi in the genus Ophiostoma.

A well-studied infestation is occurring in Monterey pine plantations in New Zealand. The beetle was first recorded there in 1929, becoming a minor pest of exotic pines, but recently the severity of its impacts on local pine forestry has become more clear. It is ubiquitous in pine plantings. As mature trees are continually harvested for wood, the many stumps left behind are infested by the beetle, which then spreads to the seedlings. While the beetle has been known to cause high levels of mortality in crops of seedlings in Chile and Australia, it does not kill many trees in New Zealand. It more often causes a reduction in wood value by damaging the tree tissue and introducing fungi.

Biological pest control efforts using parasitic and predatory insects have been unsuccessful. Early detection of the pest is a priority. Once an infestation is recognized, some methods of chemical control are used. Shipments of logs are fumigated with phosphine, which is a very effective alternative for the ozone-depleting compound methyl bromide. Traps baited with turpentine may also be an option.
