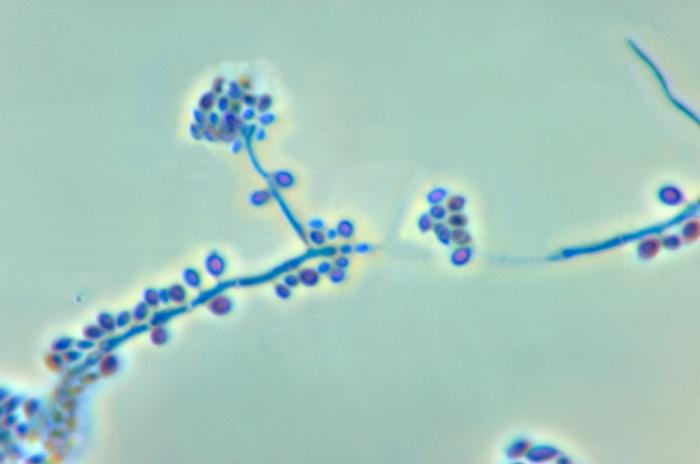
- Conidiophores and conidia

Scientific classification
- Kingdom: Fungi
- Division: Ascomycota
- Class: Sordariomycetes
- Order: Ophiostomatales
- Family: Ophiostomataceae
- Genus: Sporothrix
- Species: S. schenckii

Binomial name
- Sporothrix schenckii Hektoen & C.F.Perkins (1900)

= Sporothrix schenckii =

Species of fungus

Sporothrix schenckii, a fungus that can be found worldwide in the environment, is named for medical student Benjamin Schenck, who in 1896 was the first to isolate it from a human specimen. The species is present in soil as well as in and on living and decomposing plant material such as peat moss. It can infect humans as well as animals and is the causative agent of sporotrichosis, commonly known as "rose handler's disease." The most common route of infection is the introduction of spores to the body through a cut or puncture wound in the skin. Infection commonly occurs in otherwise healthy individuals but is rarely life-threatening and can be treated with antifungals. In the environment it is found growing as filamentous hyphae. In host tissue it is found as a yeast. The transition between the hyphal and yeast forms is temperature dependent making S. schenckii a thermally dimorphic fungus.

== Morphology ==
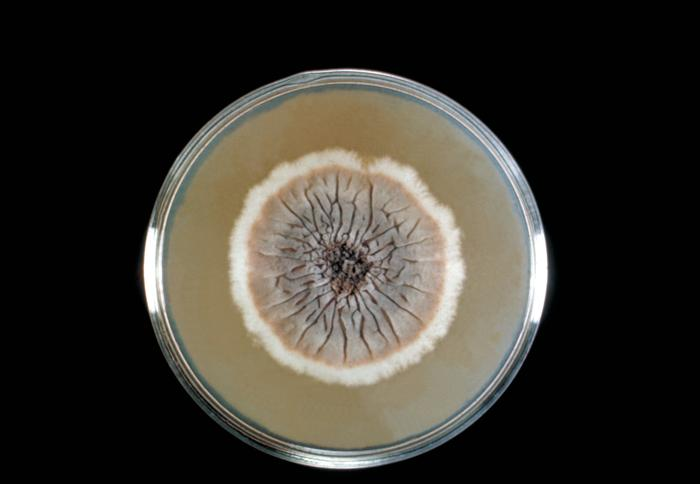
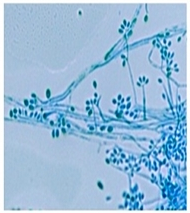
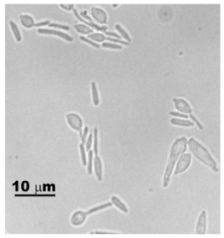
Sporothrix schenckii growing on Sabouraud agar (left). Micrograph of S. schenckii conidia stained with lactophenol cotton blue (center). Adapted from. Phase contrast micrograph of the yeast form of S. schenckii (right). Adapted from.

Sporothrix schenckii can be found in one of two morphologies, hyphal or yeast. The hyphal form is found in the environment on plants and decaying matter. When the fungus makes the transition into a host, the yeast morphology predominates.

=== Hyphal ===
When in the environment or grown in the laboratory at 25 °C (77 °F) S. schenckii assumes its hyphal form. Macroscopically, filaments are apparent and colonies are moist, leathery to velvety, and have a finely wrinkled surface. The colour is white initially and may change color over time to become cream to dark brown ("dirty candle-wax" color). Microscopically, hyphae are septate approximately 1 to 2 μm in diameter. Conidia are oval shaped and glass like (hyaline) in appearance. They may be colorless or darkly colored. Conidia are sometimes referred to as resembling a flower.

=== Yeast ===
At 37 °C (99 °F) either in the laboratory or in host tissue, S. schenckii assumes its yeast form. Macroscopically, the yeast form grows as smooth white or off-white colonies. Microscopically, yeast cells are 2 to 6 μm long and show an elongated cigar-shaped morphology.

== Epidemiology and risk factors ==
S. schenckii has a worldwide distribution but certain areas of the world including Peru, have a higher incidence of disease. Based on sequence analysis it has been found that S. schenckii isolates can be placed in phylogenetic groups that reflect the region from which they were isolated. S. schenckii is often isolated from plants and associated packing material. Gardeners, landscapers, and foresters are at high risk of infection. Sporothrix infection can also be transmitted by cat bites or scratches. This mode of transmission has been responsible for epidemics of sporotrichosis. Immunocompromised individuals are at increased risk of infection and such patients often exhibit more severe forms of disease.

== Sporotrichosis ==
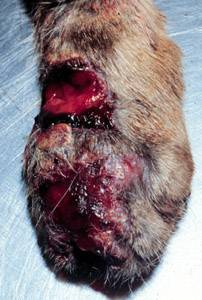
Cutaneous sporotrichosis of a cat's paw showing ulcerations.

S. schenckii most commonly enters the body through minor trauma that compromises the skin barrier. It is this route of infection, coupled with its presence on roses that give sporotrichosis its common name of "rose-handler's disease" or "rose thorn disease". Inhalation of spores is a rare route of infection largely associated with immunocompromised hosts.

=== Cutaneous and lymphocutaneous ===
The cutaneous form of disease is caused by introduction of S. schenckii into the body through disruption of the skin barrier. The first symptom of cutaneous sporotrichosis is a small skin lesion. These lesions may show ulceration and/or erythema. Commonly, infection spreads through the lymph along lymphatic vessels and causes lymphocutaneous sporotrichosis. This form of disease is characterized by the appearance of lesions at sites distant to the initial infection. Infection can occur in nonhuman animals and may be transmitted to humans through contact. Veterinarians are at particularly high risk of contracting disease from animals (zoonotic infection).

=== Disseminated ===
Disseminated disease occurs when the fungus spreads throughout the body. Found only in immunocompromised patients, it is a very severe condition. When infection becomes disseminated, S. schencki can afflict joints, the brain, and the spine. Patients with this condition must be treated aggressively with antifungals and may remain on prophylactic antifungal drugs for life to prevent recurrence or reinfection.

== Diagnostic tests ==
Sporothrix infection presents macroscopically with nonspecific symptoms. In the clinical laboratory, many fungi isolated in culture are disregarded as contaminants. Therefore, accurate patient histories are important to establish suspicion of sporotrichosis and to inform which diagnostic tests are required. S. schenckii infection may also be confused with other diseases such as pyoderma gangrenosum or sarcoidosis further underscoring the need for accurate diagnoses.

=== Primary cultures ===
Growing the fungus in pure culture is the most reliable way to identify Sporothrix infection. A patient swab or biopsy is used to inoculate Sabouraud agar or brain heart infusion agar. Sabouraud agar is incubated at room temperature for macroscopic observation of the off-white or dark brown/black hyphal form of the fungus and microscopic examination of hyphae and conidia. The yeast form is grown on brain heart infusion agar at 37 °C (99 °F). Observation of yeast colonies in addition to the hyphal form is required to confirm diagnosis of S. schenckii. Growth on media occurs in approximately one to three weeks meaning that results from patient cultures will not be immediately available to make treatment decisions.

=== Sporotrichin skin test ===
A skin test uses an antigen generated from laboratory grown S. schenckii to challenge the patient's immune system. The antigen is intradermally injected and the test is interpreted 48 hours later. Erythema at the site of injection indicates a positive response. The major advantage of this test is its rapidity and ease of use. Although it provides results more quickly than a fungal culture, the sporotrichin skin test has some important limitations. Cross reactions with other fungal species as well as positive reactions in healthy individuals have been observed. In addition, the term "sporotrichin" does not indicate a specific molecule but only any antigen derived from S. schenckii. The specific antigen used in skin testing is not standardized with multiple studies being conducted with widely varying preparations. However, owing to its simplicity, skin testing remains the method of choice for large-scale epidemiological investigations.

=== Molecular methods ===
Molecular diagnostic techniques have been used as rapid, sensitive, and specific tests for the presence of S. schenckii. PCR methods that specifically amplify the ribosomal RNA gene have been shown to detect S. schenckii in clinical samples with minimal interference from host or bacterial sequences. Serum antibody reactivity to S. schenckii antigens can also be quantified by ELISA. Although molecular biology techniques are promising in their use as diagnostic tools, their cost as well as requirement for specialized equipment and expertise means that more traditional diagnostic methods still play an important role in Sporothrix schenckii treatment.

== Treatment ==
=== Antifungal drugs ===
Where available and tolerated by the patient, antifungal drugs are indicated as the primary treatment of sporotrichosis. For cutaneous infection itraconazole or terbinafine are the primary treatment with fluconazole being recommended if primary antifungals are not well tolerated. When infection is disseminated throughout the body, Amphotericin B is the drug of choice. To completely clear the fungus, the course of treatment generally lasts from 3 to 6 months. In vitro susceptibility to antifungal drugs has been shown to be dependent on the growth phase (hyphal or yeast) of the fungus.

=== Potassium iodide ===
Oral administration of a saturated potassium iodide solution was the first effective treatment for sporotrichosis and remains the drug of choice in many parts of the world owing to its low cost and availability. Although effective, it has since been supplanted by antifungal drugs due to the requirement for multiple daily doses as well side effects including gastrointestinal upset or thyroid imbalance.

== Virulence factors ==
=== Melanin production ===
S. schenckii synthesizes melanin both in vitro and in vivo Melanin production is a virulence factor found in many fungi that cause disease and its production in S. schenckii protects the fungus from oxidative stress as well as ultraviolet light and macrophage killing. Melanin has been shown to be synthesized using the 1,8-DHN pentaketide pathway (below).

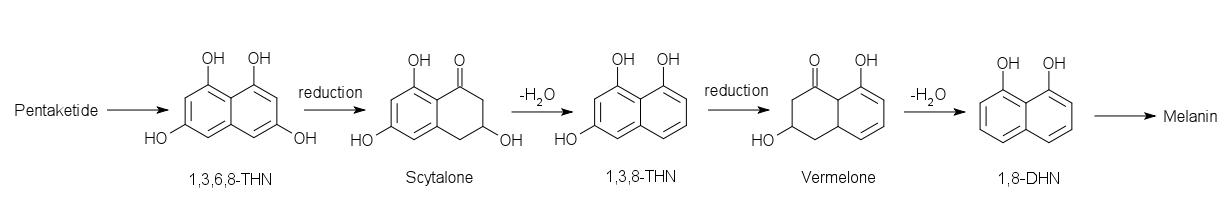
Structures of some intermediates in the pentaketide pathway of melanin biosynthesis in S. schenckii. Adapted from.

=== Adhesins ===
Adhesion is an important component of pathogenesis. The yeast form of S. schenckii shows an increased ability to bind to the host extracellular matrix proteins fibronectin and laminin using two separate receptors specific for these proteins.

=== Proteases ===
S. schenckii breaks down proteins by producing two separate proteases, a serine protease and an aspartic protease. These proteases appear to be essential for fungal growth. However, they have some functional overlap as the inactivation of either protein does not affect growth but inactivation of both inhibits the fungus. Protease activity has been shown to be important in in vivo infection of mice. Substrates for these proteases include the skin proteins type-I collagen, stratum corneum, and elastin.

=== Heat tolerance ===
Growing at host body temperature (37 °C (99 °F)) is an important requirement for pathogenesis. Some strains of S. schenckii are restricted to growing at 35 °C (95 °F) and consequently usually cause disease only on the skin as it is cooler than the body's interior. Those that are capable of growth at body temperature are more often associated with disseminated disease.

== Immune response ==
Infection by S. schenckii is generally self-limiting in immunocompetent hosts. The immune response prevents fungal dissemination and is the reason that most Sporothrix infections are cutaneous.

=== Innate ===
The yeast form of S. schenckii is effectively phagocytosed by cells of the innate immune system and are recognized based on the sugars displayed on their surface or lipids in the yeast cell membrane. Although they are taken up, they are not efficiently killed. It is hypothesized that ergosterol peroxide reacts with and detoxifies reactive oxygen species generated by the respiratory burst used by phagocytes to kill cells they have ingested. S. schenckii is also capable of modulating the immune response to promote its own survival by blocking cytokine production by macrophages.

=== Specific ===
The specific immune response is active later in infection and involves both B cells and T cells. Severe sporotrichosis is rare in endemic areas where humans are in near constant contact with S. schenckii spores. This fact, combined with the increased severity of disease in immunocompromised patients points to an important role for specific immunity in S. schenckii infection. Patients with sporotrichosis have been shown to produce antibodies specific to S. schenckii and these antibodies may actually be protective against the disease.
