= Klasterskya =

Scientific classification
- Kingdom: Fungi
- Division: Ascomycota
- Class: Sordariomycetes
- Order: Ophiostomatales
- Family: Ophiostomataceae
- Genus: Klasterskya; Petr. (1940)

Type species
- Klasterskya acuum (Mouton) Petr. (1940)

Genus of fungi

Klasterskya is a genus of fungi in the family Ophiostomataceae.

The genus name of Klasterskya is in honour of Ivan Klášterský (1901–1979), who was a Czech botanist, who was in 1925–1955 curator and director of the botany department of the National Museum (Prague).

The genus was circumscribed by Franz Petrak in Ann. Mycol. vol.38 on page 227 in 1940.

== Species ==
As accepted by Species Fungorum;

- Klasterskya acuum (Mouton) Petr. (1940)
- Klasterskya coronata Valldos. & Guarro (1989)
- Klasterskya crenata (Barrasa & G. Moreno) Valldos. & Guarro (1989)

Former species;

- Klasterskya splendens (Hesselt.) Arx (1981) = Subbaromyces splendens, Laboulbeniomycetes, Incertae sedis
