= Hylastes gracilis =

Scientific classification
- Domain: Eukaryota
- Kingdom: Animalia
- Phylum: Arthropoda
- Class: Insecta
- Order: Coleoptera
- Suborder: Polyphaga
- Infraorder: Cucujiformia
- Family: Curculionidae
- Genus: Hylastes
- Species: H. gracilis

Binomial name
- Hylastes gracilis LeConte, 1868

Species of beetle

Hylastes gracilis is a species of crenulate bark beetle in the family Curculionidae. It is found in North America.
