= Subbaromyces =

Scientific classification
- Kingdom: Fungi
- Division: Ascomycota
- Class: Laboulbeniomycetes
- Order: incertae sedis
- Family: incertae sedis
- Genus: Subbaromyces Hesselt. (1953)

Type species
- Subbaromyces splendens Hesselt. (1953)

Species
- Subbaromyces aquaticus Subbaromyces splendens

Genus of fungi

Subbaromyces is a genus of fungi once placed in the family Ophiostomataceae, Sordariomycetes. It was later moved to class Laboulbeniomycetes incertae sedis (with unknown order or family).

The genus was named to honour Yellapragada Subbarow.
