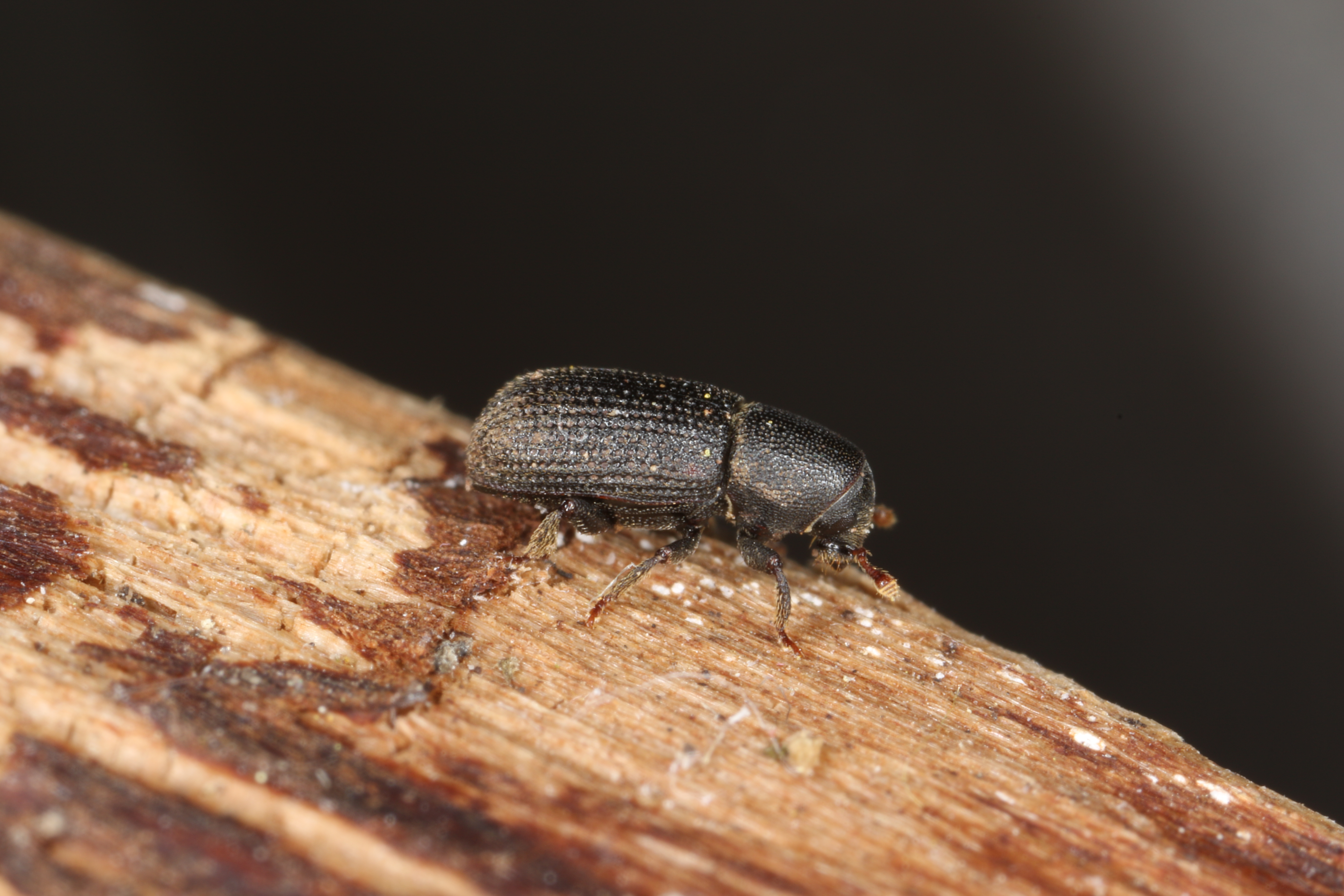

Scientific classification
- Kingdom: Animalia
- Phylum: Arthropoda
- Clade: Pancrustacea
- Class: Insecta
- Order: Coleoptera
- Suborder: Polyphaga
- Infraorder: Cucujiformia
- Family: Curculionidae
- Genus: Hylastes
- Species: H. opacus

Binomial name
- Hylastes opacus Erichson, 1836

= Hylastes opacus =

Species of beetle

Hylastes opacus is a species of crenulate bark beetle in the family Curculionidae. It is found in North America and Europe.

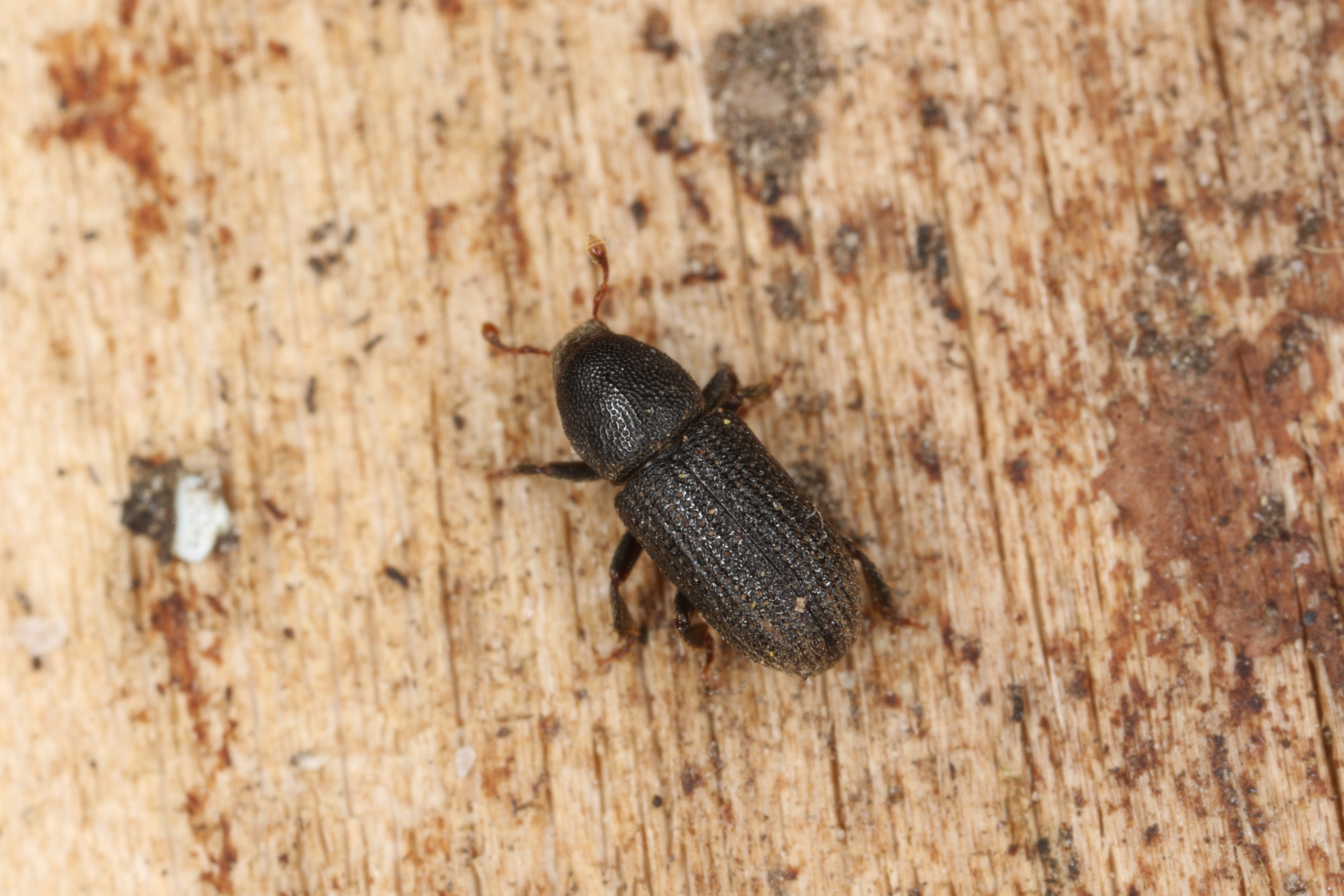

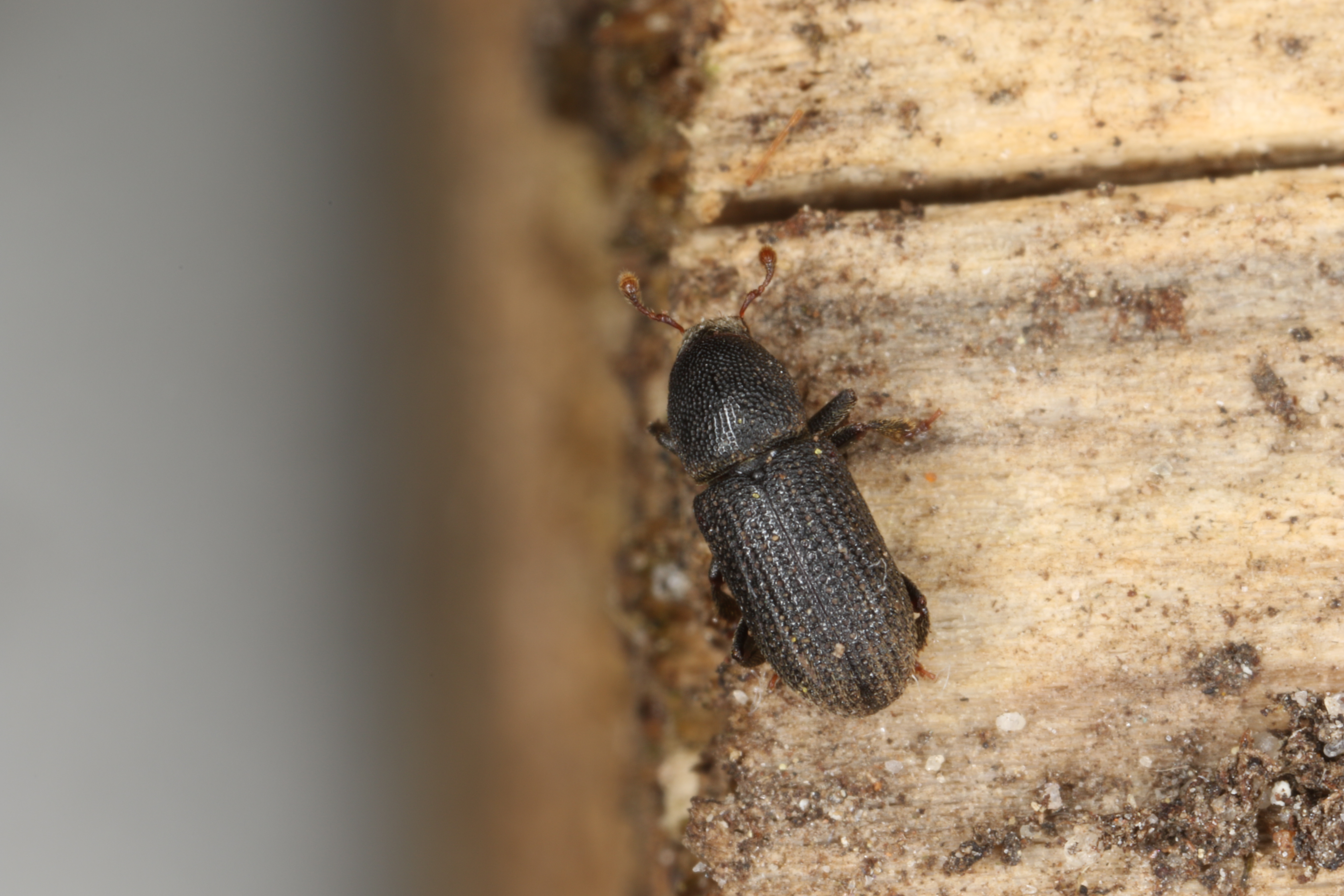
