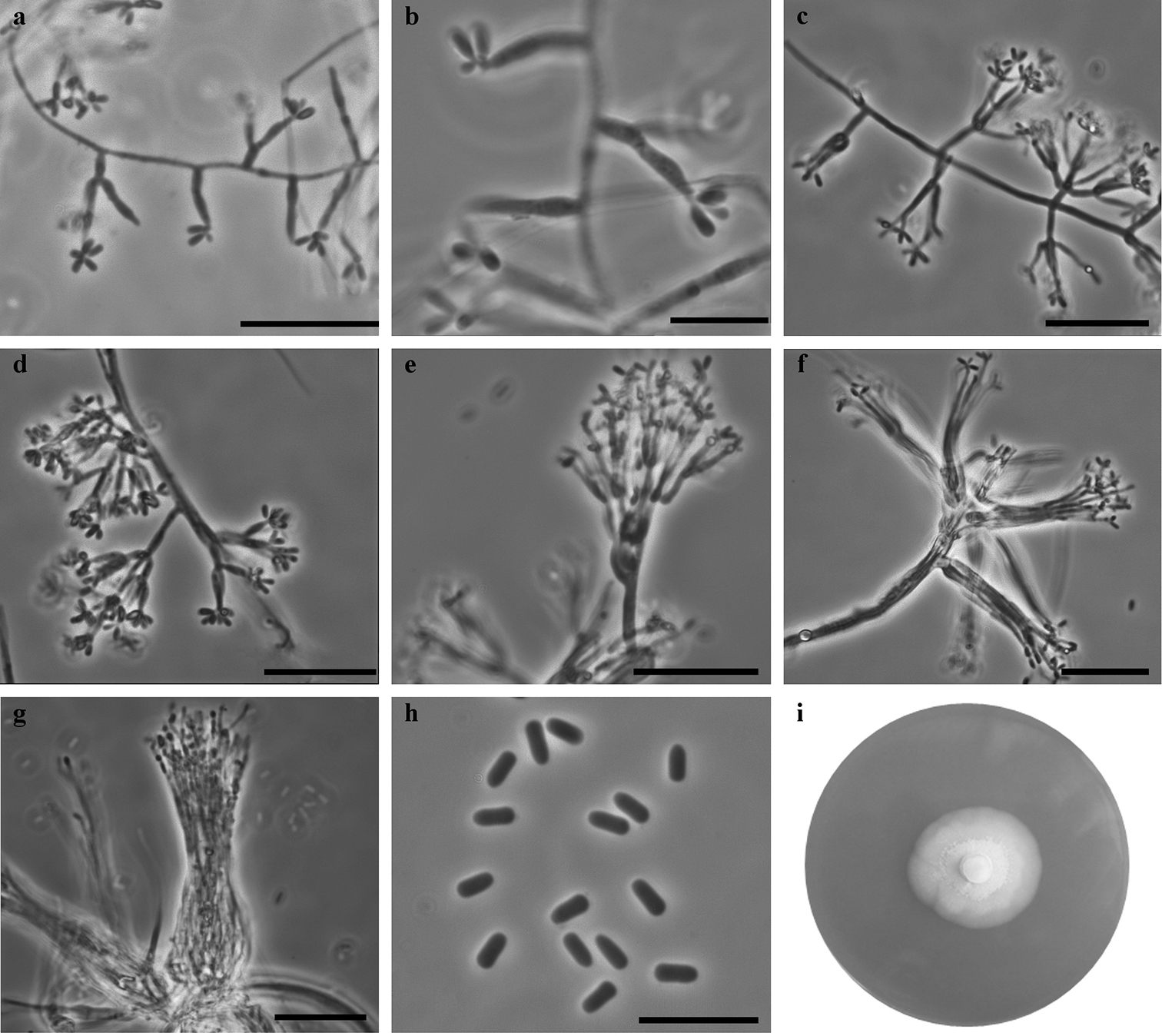
- Ceratocystiopsis synnemata

Scientific classification
- Kingdom: Fungi
- Division: Ascomycota
- Class: Sordariomycetes
- Order: Ophiostomatales
- Family: Ophiostomataceae
- Genus: Ceratocystiopsis; H.P.Upadhyay & W.B.Kendr. (1975)

Type species
- Ceratocystiopsis minuta (Siemaszko) H.P.Upadhyay & W.B.Kendr. (1975)

Species
- C. alba C. brevicomis C. minima C. minuta C. synnemata

= Ceratocystiopsis =

Genus of fungi

Ceratocystiopsis is a genus of ascomycete fungi in the family Ophiostomataceae, which infect bark.
