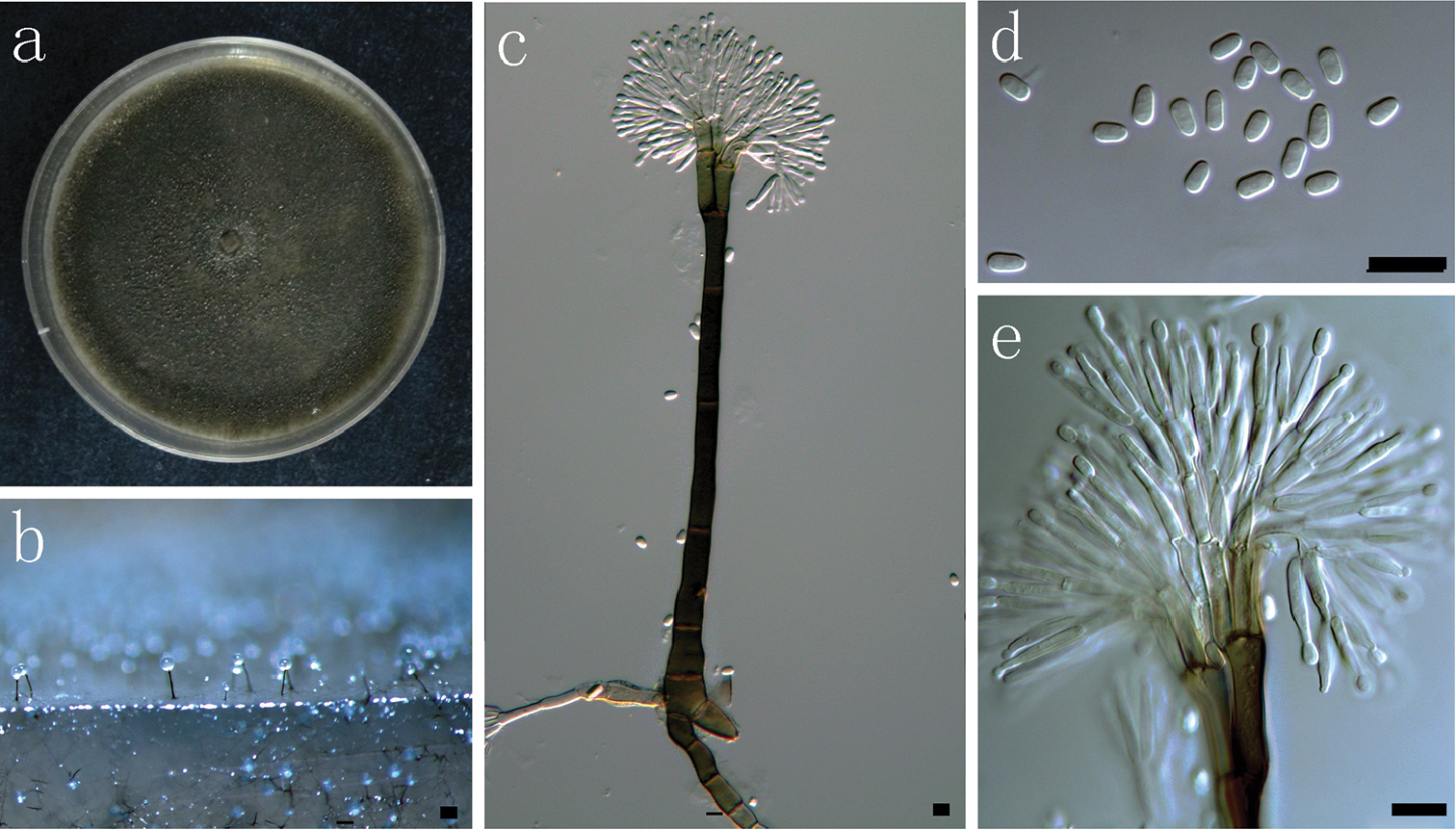
- Leptographium ningerense

Scientific classification
- Domain: Eukaryota
- Kingdom: Fungi
- Division: Ascomycota
- Class: Sordariomycetes
- Order: Ophiostomatales
- Family: Ophiostomataceae
- Genus: Leptographium; Lagerb. & Melin (1927)

Type species
- Leptographium lundbergii Lagerb. & Melin (1927)

= Leptographium =

Genus of fungi

Leptographium is a genus of fungi in the family Ophiostomataceae; it was circumscribed by Karl Erik Torsten Lagerberg & Johannes Botvid Elias Melin in 1927. It includes tree parasites which are associated with bark beetles (subfamily Scolytinae).
