= Grosmannia =

Scientific classification
- Kingdom: Fungi
- Division: Ascomycota
- Class: Sordariomycetes
- Order: Ophiostomatales
- Family: Ophiostomataceae
- Genus: Grosmannia; Goid. (1936)

Type species
- Grosmannia penicillata (Grosmann) Goid. (1936)

Genus of fungi

Grosmannia is a genus of fungi in the family Ophiostomataceae. It was circumscribed by G. Goidànich in 1936.

The genus name of Grosmannia is in honour of Helene Margarete Amalie Francke-Grosmann (1900 - 1990), who was a German botanist (Mycology) and Phytopathologist.

The genus was circumscribed by Gabriele Goidànich in Boll. Staz. Patol. Veg. Roma ser.2, Vol.16 on page 31 in 1936.

== Species ==
- Grosmannia abiocarpa
- Grosmannia aenigmatica
- Grosmannia americana
- Grosmannia aurea
- Grosmannia cainii
- Grosmannia clavigera
- Grosmannia crassivaginata
- Grosmannia cucullata
- Grosmannia davidsonii
- Grosmannia dryocoetis
- Grosmannia europhioides
- Grosmannia francke-grosmanniae
- Grosmannia galeiformis
- Grosmannia huntii
- Grosmannia laricis
- Grosmannia olivacea
- Grosmannia pseudoeurophioides
- Grosmannia robusta
- Grosmannia sagmatospora
- Grosmannia wageneri
