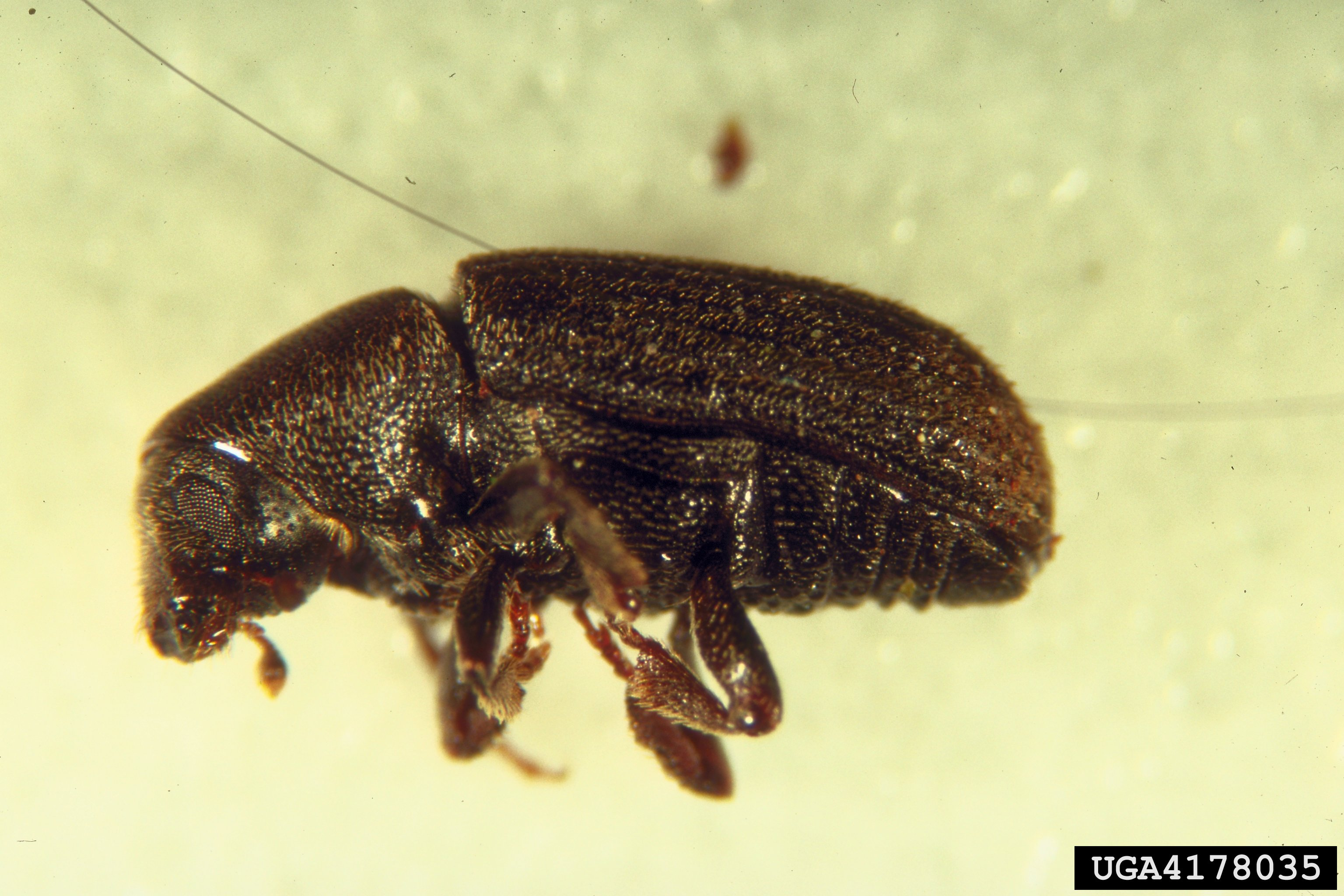
- An adult Hylastes porculus

Scientific classification
- Kingdom: Animalia
- Phylum: Arthropoda
- Clade: Pancrustacea
- Class: Insecta
- Order: Coleoptera
- Suborder: Polyphaga
- Infraorder: Cucujiformia
- Family: Curculionidae
- Genus: Hylastes
- Species: H. porculus

Binomial name
- Hylastes porculus Erichson, 1836

= Hylastes porculus =

Species of beetle

Hylastes porculus is a species of crenulate bark beetle in the family Curculionidae. It is found in North America.
