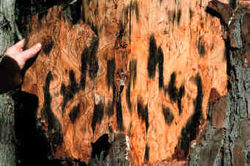
- Ophiostoma minus

Scientific classification
- Domain: Eukaryota
- Kingdom: Fungi
- Division: Ascomycota
- Class: Sordariomycetes
- Order: Ophiostomatales
- Family: Ophiostomataceae
- Genus: Ophiostoma; Syd. & P.Syd. (1919)

Type species
- Ophiostoma piliferum (Fr.) Syd. & P.Syd. (1919)

Synonyms
- Linostoma Höhn. (1919)

= Ophiostoma =

Genus of fungi

Ophiostoma is a genus of fungi within the family Ophiostomataceae. It was circumscribed in 1919 by mycologists Hans Sydow and Paul Sydow.

Note the former type species of Ophiostoma piliferum (Fr.) Syd. & P. Syd. (1919) is now Ceratocystis pilifera, Ceratocystidaceae family.

The genus has a cosmopolitan distribution worldwide, except for central Asia, northern Africa and Russia.

== Species ==
The following 129 species are accepted in the genus Ophiostoma:

- Ophiostoma adjuncti (R.W. Davidson) T.C. Harr. (1987)
- Ophiostoma aggregatum H.M. Wang, Q. Lu & Zhen Zhang (2019)
- Ophiostoma ainoae H. Solheim (1986)
- Ophiostoma album H.M. Wang & Q. Lu (2018)
- Ophiostoma allantosporum (H.D. Griffin) M. Villarreal (2005)
- Ophiostoma angusticollis (E.F. Wright & H.D. Griffin) M. Villarreal (2005)
- Ophiostoma araucariae (Butin) de Hoog & R.J. Scheff. (1984)
- Ophiostoma arduennense F.-X. Carlier, Decock, K. Jacobs & Maraite (2006)
- Ophiostoma australiae (Kamgan, K. Jacobs & M.J. Wingf.) Z.W. de Beer & M.J. Wingf. (2013)
- Ophiostoma bacillisporum (Butin & G. Zimm.) de Hoog & R.J. Scheff. (1984)
- Ophiostoma bicolor R.W. Davidson & D.E. Wells (1955)
- Ophiostoma boreale Kamgan, H. Solheim & Z.W. de Beer (2010)
- Ophiostoma brevicolle (R.W. Davidson) de Hoog & R.J. Scheff. (1984)
- Ophiostoma brevipilosi R. Chang & Z.W. de Beer (2017)
- Ophiostoma breviusculum W.Hsin Chung, Yamaoka, Uzunovic & J.J. Kim (2007)
- Ophiostoma brunneociliatum Math.-Käärik (1954)
- Ophiostoma brunneolum Linnakoski, Z.W. De Beer & M.J. Wingf. (2016)
- Ophiostoma brunneum (R.W. Davidson) Georg Hausner & J. Reid (2003)
- Ophiostoma canum (Münch) Syd. & P. Syd. (1919)
- Ophiostoma carpenteri J. Reid & Georg Hausner (2003)
- Ophiostoma clavatum Math.-Käärik (1951)
- Ophiostoma colliferum (Marm. & Butin) Georg Hausner, J. Reid & Klassen (1993)
- Ophiostoma conicola Marm. & Butin (1990)
- Ophiostoma cuculatum H. Solheim (1986)
- Ophiostoma cupulatum (McNew & T.C. Harr.) Z.W. de Beer & M.J. Wingf. (2013)
- Ophiostoma denticiliatum Linnak., Z.W. de Beer & M.J. Wingf. (2009)
- Ophiostoma denticulatum (R.W. Davidson) Z.W. de Beer & M.J. Wingf. (2013)
- Ophiostoma distortum (R.W. Davidson) de Hoog & R.J. Scheff. (1984)
- Ophiostoma exiguum (Hedgc.) Syd. & P. Syd. (1919)
- Ophiostoma flexuosum H. Solheim (1986)
- Ophiostoma fuscum Linnak., Z.W. de Beer & M.J. Wingf. (2010)
- Ophiostoma genhense Z. Wang & Q. Lu (2020)
- Ophiostoma gilletteae Marinc., Z.W. de Beer & M.J. Wingf. (2020)
- Ophiostoma gmelinii R.L. Chang, Z.W. de Beer & M.J. Wingf. (2021)
- Ophiostoma grande Samuels & E. Müll. (1979)
- Ophiostoma himal-ulmi Brasier& M.D. Mehrotra (1995)
- Ophiostoma hongxingense Z. Wang & Q. Lu (2020)
- Ophiostoma huangnanense Zheng Wang & Q. Lu (2021)
- Ophiostoma hylesini T. Aas, H. Solheim & R. Jankowiak (2018)
- Ophiostoma japonicum Yamaoka & M.J. Wingf. (1997)
- Ophiostoma jiamusiense R. Chang, Z.W. de Beer & M.J. Wingf. (2018)
- Ophiostoma karelicum Linnak., Z.W. de Beer & M.J. Wingf. (2008)
- Ophiostoma koreanum Masuya, J.J. Kim & M.J. Wingf. (2006)
- Ophiostoma kryptum K. Jacobs & Kirisits (2003)
- Ophiostoma kunlunense R.L. Chang & Z.W. de Beer (2020)
- Ophiostoma leucocarpum (R.W. Davidson) Z.W. de Beer & M.J. Wingf. (2013)
- Ophiostoma lignorum (Wollenw.) Goid. (1935)
- Ophiostoma longicollum Masuya (1998)
- Ophiostoma longiconidiatum Kamgan, K. Jacobs & Jol. Roux (2008)
- Ophiostoma macroclavatum Linnakoski, Z.W. De Beer & M.J. Wingf. (2016)
- Ophiostoma macrosporum (Francke-Grosm.) Z.W. de Beer & M.J. Wingf. (2013)
- Ophiostoma maixiuense Zheng Wang & Q. Lu (2021)
- Ophiostoma manchongi R.L. Chang & Z.W. de Beer (2020)
- Ophiostoma manitobense J. Reid & Georg Hausner (2003)
- Ophiostoma massonianae H.M. Wang & Q. Lu (2018)
- Ophiostoma megalobrunneum (R.W. Davidson & Toole) de Hoog & R.J. Scheff. (1984)
- Ophiostoma micantis M.L. Yin, Z.W. de Beer & M.J. Wingf. (2016)
- Ophiostoma minutabicolor (R.W. Davidson) Georg Hausner, J. Reid & Klassen (1993)
- Ophiostoma multiannulatum (Hedgc. & R.W. Davidson) Hendr. (1937)
- Ophiostoma multisynnematum Z. Wang & Q. Lu (2020)
- Ophiostoma nigrogranum Masuya (2003)
- Ophiostoma nikkoense Yamaoka & Masuya (2004)
- Ophiostoma nitidi M.L. Yin, Z.W. de Beer & M.J. Wingf. (2016)
- Ophiostoma noisomeae Musvuugwa, Dreyer & Roets (2016)
- Ophiostoma novo-ulmi Brasier (1991)
- Ophiostoma olgensis H.M. Wang & Q. Lu (2016)
- Ophiostoma pallidobrunneum (Olchow. & J. Reid) Georg Hausner & J. Reid (2003)
- Ophiostoma palustre J.A. Osorio, Z.W. de Beer & Jol. Roux (2016)
- Ophiostoma patagonicum Errasti & Z.W. de Beer (2016)
- Ophiostoma pehueninum M. Zapata, M.A. Palma & E. Piontelli (2018)
- Ophiostoma peniculi Z. Wang & Q. Lu (2020)
- Ophiostoma peregrinum de Errasti & Rajchenb. (2017)
- Ophiostoma perfectum (R.W. Davidson) de Hoog (1974)
- Ophiostoma persicinum Govi & Di Caro (1953)
- Ophiostoma piliferi H.M. Wang & Q. Lu (2022)
- Ophiostoma pityokteinis Jankowiak & Bilański (2019)
- Ophiostoma poligraphi M.L. Yin, Z.W. de Beer & M.J. Wingf. (2016)
- Ophiostoma populicola (Olchow. & J. Reid) Z.W. de Beer, Seifert, M.J. Wingf. (2013)
- Ophiostoma populinum (T.E. Hinds & R.W. Davidson) de Hoog & R.J. Scheff. (1984)
- Ophiostoma protearum G.J. Marais & M.J. Wingf. (1997)
- Ophiostoma pseudobicolor Z. Wang & Q. Lu (2020)
- Ophiostoma pseudocatenulatum Jankowiak, Linnak. & Z.W. de Beer (2016)
- Ophiostoma pseudokarelicum T. Aas, H. Solheim & R. Jankowiak (2018)
- Ophiostoma pulvinisporum X.D. Zhou & M.J. Wingf. (2004)
- Ophiostoma qinghaiense M.L. Yin, Z.W. de Beer & M.J. Wingf. (2016)
- Ophiostoma qinlingense Hui Chen & M. Tang (2004)
- Ophiostoma rachisporum Linnak., Z.W. de Beer & M.J. Wingf. (2010)
- Ophiostoma ranaculosum (J.R. Bridges & T.J. Perry) Georg Hausner, J. Reid & Klassen (1993)
- Ophiostoma retusi (R.W. Davidson & T.E. Hinds) Georg Hausner, J. Reid & Klassen (1993)
- Ophiostoma rollhansenianum J. Reid, Eyjólfsd. & Georg Hausner (2003)
- Ophiostoma roraimense Samuels & E. Müll. (1979)
- Ophiostoma rufum Jankowiak & Bilański (2019)
- Ophiostoma sanum Zheng Wang & Q. Lu (2021)
- Ophiostoma sejunctum M. Villarreal, Arenal, V. Rubio & De Troya (2005)
- Ophiostoma serpens (Goid.) Arx (1952)
- Ophiostoma setosum Uzunovic, Seifert, S.H. Kim & C. Breuil (2000)
- Ophiostoma shangrilae M.L. Yin, Z.W. de Beer & M.J. Wingf. (2016)
- Ophiostoma shanxiense Marinc., Z.W. de Beer & M.J. Wingf. (2020)
- Ophiostoma shennongense H.M. Wang & Q. Lu (2021)
- Ophiostoma signati T. Aas, H. Solheim & R. Jankowiak (2018)
- Ophiostoma simplex K. Jacobs & M.J. Wingf. (1997)
- Ophiostoma songshui R. Chang, Z.W. de Beer & M.J. Wingf. (2018)
- Ophiostoma sparsiannulatum Zanzot, Z.W. de Beer & M.J. Wingf. (2010)
- Ophiostoma spinosum P.F. Cannon (1997)
- Ophiostoma splendens G.J. Marais & M.J. Wingf. (1994)
- Ophiostoma ssiori Masuya, Kubono & Ichihara (2003)
- Ophiostoma subalpinum Ohtaka & Masuya (2002)
- Ophiostoma subannulatum Livingston & R.W. Davidson (1987)
- Ophiostoma subelongati Z. Wang & Q. Lu (2020)
- Ophiostoma sugadairense Jin Li, Yamaoka & Masuya (2017)
- Ophiostoma taizhouense G.H. Zheng & Q. Lu (2022)
- Ophiostoma taphrorychi Strzałka & Jankowiak (2019)
- Ophiostoma tapionis Linnak., Z.W. de Beer & M.J. Wingf. (2010)
- Ophiostoma tasmaniense Kamgan, Jol. Roux & Z.W. de Beer (2011)
- Ophiostoma tetropii Math.-Käärik (1951)
- Ophiostoma tingens (Lagerb. & Melin) Z.W. de Beer & M.J. Wingf. (2013)
- Ophiostoma tonghuaense H.M. Wang & Q. Lu (2022)
- Ophiostoma tremulo-aureum (R.W. Davidson & T.E. Hinds) de Hoog & R.J. Scheff. (1984)
- Ophiostoma triangulosporum Butin (1978)
- Ophiostoma trinacriforme (A.K. Parker) T.C. Harr. (1987)
- Ophiostoma tsotsi Grobbel., Z.W. De Beer & M.J. Wingf. (2009)
- Ophiostoma typographi R. Chang, Z.W. de Beer & M.J. Wingf. (2018)
- Ophiostoma ulmi (Buisman) Nannf. (1934)
- Ophiostoma undulatum Kamgan, M.J. Wingf. & Jol. Roux (2011)
- Ophiostoma valdivianum (Butin) Rulamort (1986)
- Ophiostoma villosi T. Aas, H. Solheim & R. Jankowiak (2018)
- Ophiostoma wuyingense R. Chang, Z.W. de Beer & M.J. Wingf. (2018)
- Ophiostoma xinganense Z. Wang & Q. Lu (2020)
- Ophiostoma yaluense H.M. Wang & Q. Lu (2022)
