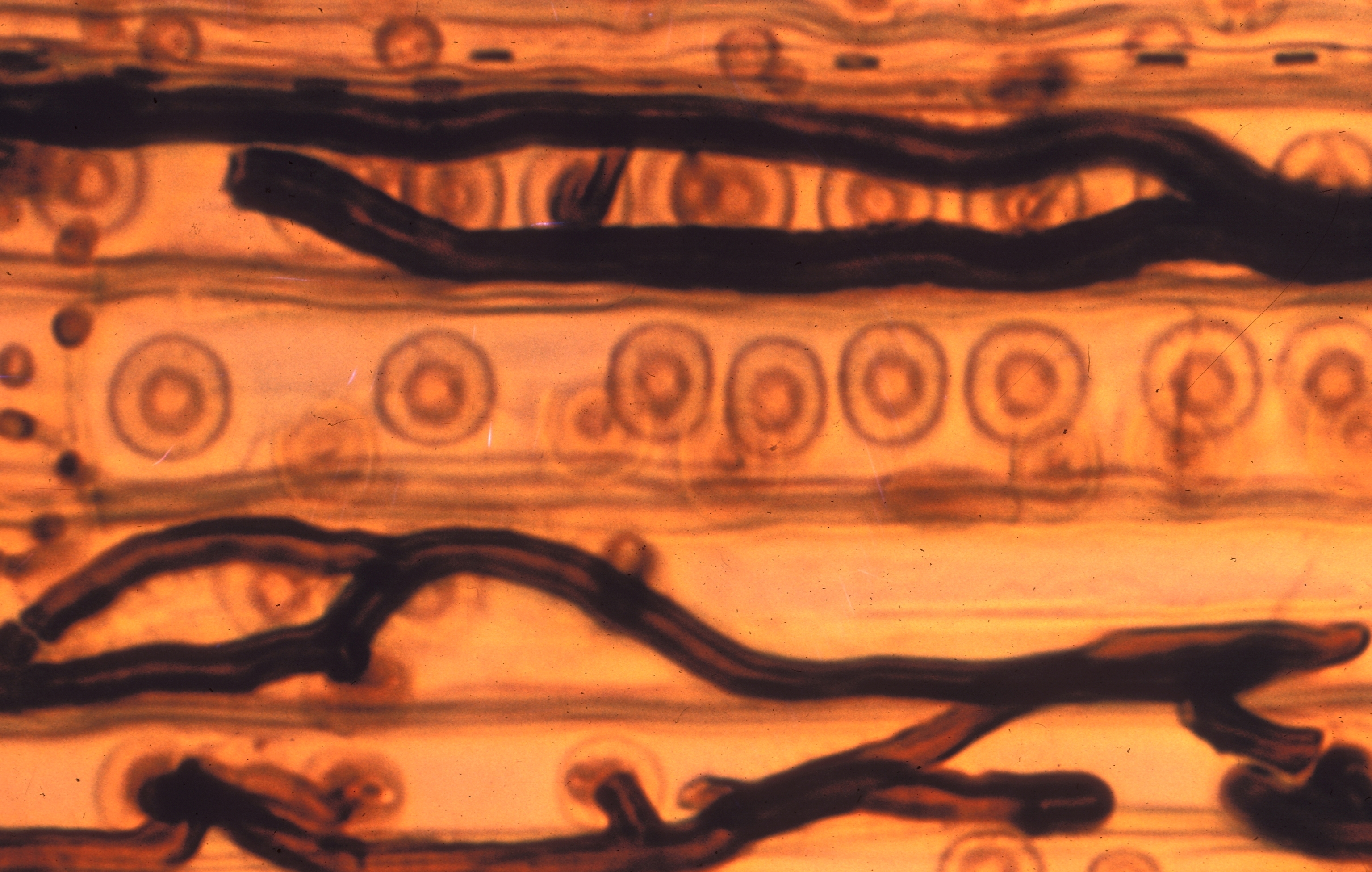
- Hyphae of Ophiostoma wageneri

Scientific classification
- Kingdom: Fungi
- Division: Ascomycota
- Class: Sordariomycetes
- Order: Ophiostomatales
- Family: Ophiostomataceae; Nannf. (1932)

Type genus
- Ophiostoma Syd. & P.Syd. (1919)

= Ophiostomataceae =

Family of fungi

The Ophiostomataceae are a family of fungi in the Ascomycota, class Sordariomycetes. The family was circumscribed by J.A. Nannfeldt in 1932. Species in the family have a widespread distribution, and are typically found in temperate regions, as pathogens of both coniferous and deciduous trees.

== Genera ==
As accepted by Wijayawardene et al. 2020, with the amount of species in brackets;

- Afroraffaele C.C. Bateman, Y.T. Huang & D.R. Simmons (1)
- Aureovirg J.A. van der Linde, Z.W. de Beer & Jol. Roux (1)
- Ceratocystiopsis H.P. Upadhyay & W.B. Kendr. (5)
- Fragosphaeria Shear (2)
- Graphilbum H.P. Upadhyay & W.B. Kendr. (13)
- Hawksworthiomyces Z.W. de Beer, Marinc. & M.J. Wingf. (4)
- Klasterskya Petr. (3)
- Leptographium Lagerb. & Melin (= Grosmannia, Gold.) (74)
- Ophiostoma Syd. & P. Syd. (includes Hyalorhinocladiella H.P. Upadhyay & W.B. Kendr. and Pesotum J.L. Crane & Schokn.) (134)
- Raffaelea Arx & Hennebert (33)
- Sporothrix Hektoen & C.F. Perkins (79)
- Spumatoria Massee & E.S. Salmon (1)

Former genera; Dryadomyces, Equicapillimyces, Graphiocladiella, Knoxdaviesia, Pachnodium and Subbaromyces
