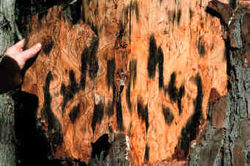
- Ophiostoma minus

Scientific classification
- Kingdom: Fungi
- Division: Ascomycota
- Class: Sordariomycetes
- Subclass: Diaporthomycetidae
- Order: Ophiostomatales; Benny & Kimbr. (1980)

Families
- Kathistaceae; Ophiostomataceae

= Ophiostomatales =

Order of fungi

The Ophiostomatales are an order of fungi in the class Sordariomycetes. They are commonly symbionts to insect species, which can be found in numerous cases, including some termites and many bark beetles. In the cases of most beetle symbioses, the Ophiostomatales fungi is carried in mycangia, which help keep fungal inoculants close to the beetle at all times. In some cases, the fungi are the main source of food for the beetles. In others, the relationship is not as clear.
