= List of Hylesinus species =

This is a list of 182 species in Hylesinus, a genus of crenulate bark beetles in the family Curculionidae.

== Hylesinus species ==
- Hylesinus abietinus Fabricius, J.C., 1801^{c}
- Hylesinus aculeatus Say, 1824^{i c b} (eastern ash bark beetle)
- Hylesinus adspersus Passerini, 1843^{c}
- Hylesinus aeneipennis Fabricius, J.C., 1801^{c}
- Hylesinus aesculi ^{c g}
- Hylesinus africanus Schedl, 1965f^{c}
- Hylesinus alternans Schedl, 1959j^{c}
- Hylesinus angustatus Gyllenhal, 1813^{c}
- Hylesinus antipodus Schedl, 1951d^{c}
- Hylesinus aspericollis Leconte, 1876^{c}
- Hylesinus ater ^{c}
- Hylesinus atomarius Chapuis, 1869^{c}
- Hylesinus attenuatus Erichson, 1836^{c}
- Hylesinus aubei Perris, 1855^{c}
- Hylesinus aztecus Wood, 1980b^{c}
- Hylesinus bakeri Sampson, 1921^{c}
- Hylesinus bicolor Brullé, 1832^{c}
- Hylesinus botscharnikovi Stark, V.N., 1931c^{c}
- Hylesinus brevicollis Kolenati, 1846^{c}
- Hylesinus brevipes Fabricius, J.C., 1801^{c}
- Hylesinus brevipilosus Schedl, 1942c^{c}
- Hylesinus brevis Gistel, 1848^{c}
- Hylesinus brunneus Erichson, 1836^{c}
- Hylesinus californicus (Swaine, 1916)^{i c b} (western ash bark beetle)
- Hylesinus canaliculatus Fabricius, J.C., 1801^{c}
- Hylesinus caseariae Wood, 1986c^{c}
- Hylesinus chloropus Duftschmidt, 1825^{c}
- Hylesinus cholodkovskyi Berger, 1916^{c}
- Hylesinus cingulatus Blandford, 1894c^{c}
- Hylesinus coadunatus Stephens, 1829^{c}
- Hylesinus cordipennis Lea, 1910^{c}
- Hylesinus corticiperda Erichson, 1836^{c}
- Hylesinus costatus Blandford, 1894c^{c}
- Hylesinus crassus Beeson, 1929^{c}
- Hylesinus crenatulus Duftschmidt, 1825^{c}
- Hylesinus crenatus Panzer, 1813^{c g}
- Hylesinus criddlei (Swaine, 1918)^{i c b}
- Hylesinus cristatus LeConte, 1868^{c}
- Hylesinus cunicularius Erichson, 1836^{c}
- Hylesinus curvifer Walker, F., 1859^{c}
- Hylesinus debilis Schedl (Chapuis in), 1958k^{c}
- Hylesinus decumanus Erichson, 1836^{c}
- Hylesinus denticulosus Sokanovskii, B.V., 1956^{c}
- Hylesinus despectus Walker, F., 1859^{c}
- Hylesinus dolus Schedl, 1975e^{c}
- Hylesinus dromiscens Scudder, S.H., 1893^{c}
- Hylesinus elatus Niisima, 1913a^{c}
- Hylesinus elegans Thomson, J., 1858^{c}
- Hylesinus elongatus Schedl, 1942c^{c}
- Hylesinus eos Spessivtsev, P., 1919^{c}
- Hylesinus esau Gredler, 1866^{c}
- Hylesinus extractus Scudder, S.H., 1893^{c}
- Hylesinus facilis Heer, O., 1856^{c g}
- Hylesinus fasciatus LeConte, 1868^{i c b}
- Hylesinus fici Lea, 1904^{c}
- Hylesinus flavipes Panzer, 1795^{c}
- Hylesinus flavus Fabricius, J.C., 1801^{c}
- Hylesinus fraxini Fabricius, J.C., 1801^{c}
- Hylesinus fraxinoides Beeson, 1961^{c}
- Hylesinus furcatus Stephens, 1829^{c}
- Hylesinus fuscus Duftschmidt, 1825^{c}
- Hylesinus gibbus Fabricius, J.C., 1801^{c}
- Hylesinus globosus Eichhoff, 1868c^{c}
- Hylesinus grandis Dejean, 1821^{c}
- Hylesinus granulifer Motschulsky, 1863^{c}
- Hylesinus graphus Duftschmid, 1825^{c}
- Hylesinus guatemalensis Wood, 1982b^{c}
- Hylesinus haemorrhoidalis Stephens, 1829^{c}
- Hylesinus hederae Schmidt, 1843^{c}
- Hylesinus henscheli Knotek, 1892b^{c}
- Hylesinus hispidus Klug, 1833^{c}
- Hylesinus hystrix LeConte, 1858^{c}
- Hylesinus impar Schedl, 1975g^{c}
- Hylesinus imperialis Eichhoff, 1868c^{c}
- Hylesinus indigenus Wollaston, 1864^{c}
- Hylesinus insularum Beeson, 1940^{c}
- Hylesinus interstitialis Lea, 1910^{c}
- Hylesinus javanus Eggers, 1923a^{c}
- Hylesinus kraatzi Eichhoff, 1864b^{c}
- Hylesinus laticollis Blandford, 1894c^{c}
- Hylesinus ligniperda Gyllenhal, 1813^{c}
- Hylesinus linearis Erichson, 1836^{c}
- Hylesinus lineatus Foerster, B., 1891^{c g}
- Hylesinus lubarskii Stark, V.N., 1936a^{c}
- Hylesinus luridus Dejean, 1821^{c}
- Hylesinus machilus Schedl, 1959j^{c}
- Hylesinus maculatus Fabricius, J.C., 1801^{c}
- Hylesinus maculipennis Schedl, 1975g^{c}
- Hylesinus mandshuricus Eggers, 1922c^{c}
- Hylesinus marginatus Duftschmidt, 1825^{c}
- Hylesinus melanocephalus Fabricius, J.C., 1801^{c}
- Hylesinus mexicanus (Wood, 1956)^{i c b}
- Hylesinus micans Ratzeburg, 1839^{c}
- Hylesinus minimus Fabricius, J.C., 1801^{c}
- Hylesinus minor Hartig, 1834^{c}
- Hylesinus minutus Fabricius, J.C., 1801^{c}
- Hylesinus nanus Schedl, 1940b^{c}
- Hylesinus nebulosus LeConte, 1859^{c}
- Hylesinus neli Petrov & Zherikhin, 2004^{c}
- Hylesinus niger Fabricius, J.C., 1801^{c}
- Hylesinus nilgirinus Eggers, 1923a^{c}
- Hylesinus nobilis Blandford, 1894c^{c}
- Hylesinus obscurus Fabricius, J.C., 1801^{c}
- Hylesinus oleae Fabricius, J.C., 1801^{c}
- Hylesinus oleiperda Fabricius, J.C., 1801^{c}
- Hylesinus opaculus LeConte, 1868^{c}
- Hylesinus opacus Erichson, 1836^{c}
- Hylesinus oregonus (Blackman, 1943)^{i c}
- Hylesinus orni Fuchs, 1906a^{c}
- Hylesinus pacificus Beeson, 1929^{c}
- Hylesinus palliatus Gyllenhal, 1813^{c}
- Hylesinus papuanus Eggers, 1923a^{c}
- Hylesinus paykulli Duftschmidt, 1825^{c}
- Hylesinus paykullii Duftschmid, 1825^{c}
- Hylesinus pellitus Schedl, 1955b^{c}
- Hylesinus perrisi Chapuis, 1869^{c}
- Hylesinus persimilis Eggers, 1927c^{c}
- Hylesinus pertinax Schedl, 1975g^{c}
- Hylesinus philippinensis Eggers, 1923a^{c}
- Hylesinus picipennis Stephens, 1829^{c}
- Hylesinus pictus Sturm, 1826^{c}
- Hylesinus pilifer Eggers, 1927a^{c}
- Hylesinus pilosus Ratzeburg, 1837^{c}
- Hylesinus pilula Erichson, 1847^{c}
- Hylesinus piniperda Fabricius, J.C., 1801^{c}
- Hylesinus porcatus Chapuis, 1869^{c}
- Hylesinus porculus Erichson, 1836^{c}
- Hylesinus pravdini Stark, V.N., 1936a^{c}
- Hylesinus prestae Costa, 1839^{c}
- Hylesinus pruinosus Eichhoff, 1868^{i c b}
- Hylesinus prutenskyi Sokanovskii, B.V., 1959a^{c}
- Hylesinus pubescens Fabricius, J.C., 1801^{c}
- Hylesinus pusillus Gerstäcker, 1855^{c}
- Hylesinus putonii Eichhoff, 1868b^{c}
- Hylesinus pygmaeus Fabricius, J.C., 1801^{c}
- Hylesinus retamae Perris, 1864a^{c}
- Hylesinus reticulatus Chapuis, 1869^{c}
- Hylesinus rhododactylus Gyllenhal, 1827^{c}
- Hylesinus robustus Eggers, 1939d^{c}
- Hylesinus samoanus Schedl, 1951k^{c}
- Hylesinus scaber Stephens, 1829^{c}
- Hylesinus scabricollis Sturm, 1826^{c}
- Hylesinus scabrifrons Ratzeburg (St. in), 1839^{c}
- Hylesinus scobipennis Chapuis, 1869^{c}
- Hylesinus scolytus Fabricius, J.C., 1801^{c}
- Hylesinus scutulatus Blandford, 1894c^{c}
- Hylesinus sericeus Stephens, 1829^{c}
- Hylesinus serraticornis Dejean, 1821^{c}
- Hylesinus serratus LeConte, 1868^{c}
- Hylesinus shabliovskyi Kurenzov, 1941a^{c}
- Hylesinus similis Eggers, 1923a^{c}
- Hylesinus simson Gistl, 1848^{c}
- Hylesinus sordidus Dejean, 1821^{c}
- Hylesinus spartii Nordlinger, 1847^{c}
- Hylesinus squamulatus Redtenbacher, 1858^{c}
- Hylesinus striatus Eggers, 1933b^{c}
- Hylesinus subcostatus Eggers, 1923a^{c}
- Hylesinus subopacus Eggers, 1930c^{c}
- Hylesinus sulcinodis Schedl, 1974d^{c}
- Hylesinus sumatranus Eggers, 1923a^{c}
- Hylesinus suturalis Redtenbacher, 1842^{c}
- Hylesinus taranio Wood & Bright, 1992^{c g}
- Hylesinus tarsalis Forster, A., 1849^{c}
- Hylesinus tenebrosus Sahlberg C R, 1836^{c}
- Hylesinus tenerrimus Sahlberg C R, 1836^{c}
- Hylesinus terminatus Sahlberg, 1839^{c}
- Hylesinus testaceus Fabricius, J.C., 1801^{c}
- Hylesinus thujae Perris, 1855^{c}
- Hylesinus toranio (D'Anthoine, 1788)^{g}
- Hylesinus trifolii Mueller, 1803^{c}
- Hylesinus tristis Blandford, 1894c^{c}
- Hylesinus tupolevi Stark, V.N., 1936a^{c}
- Hylesinus uniformis Endrödi, 1957a^{c}
- Hylesinus varius (Fabricius, J.C., 1775)^{c g}
- Hylesinus verae Petrov, 2002^{c}
- Hylesinus vestitus Mulsant & Rey, 1861b^{c}
- Hylesinus vicinus Comolli, 1837^{c}
- Hylesinus villosus Fabricius, J.C., 1801^{c}
- Hylesinus vittatus Fabricius, J.C., 1801^{c}
- Hylesinus volvulus Fabricius, J.C., 1801^{c}
- Hylesinus wachtli Reitter, 1887b^{c}
- Hylesinus wallacei Blandford, 1896b^{c}

Data sources: i = ITIS, c = Catalogue of Life, g = GBIF, b = Bugguide.net
