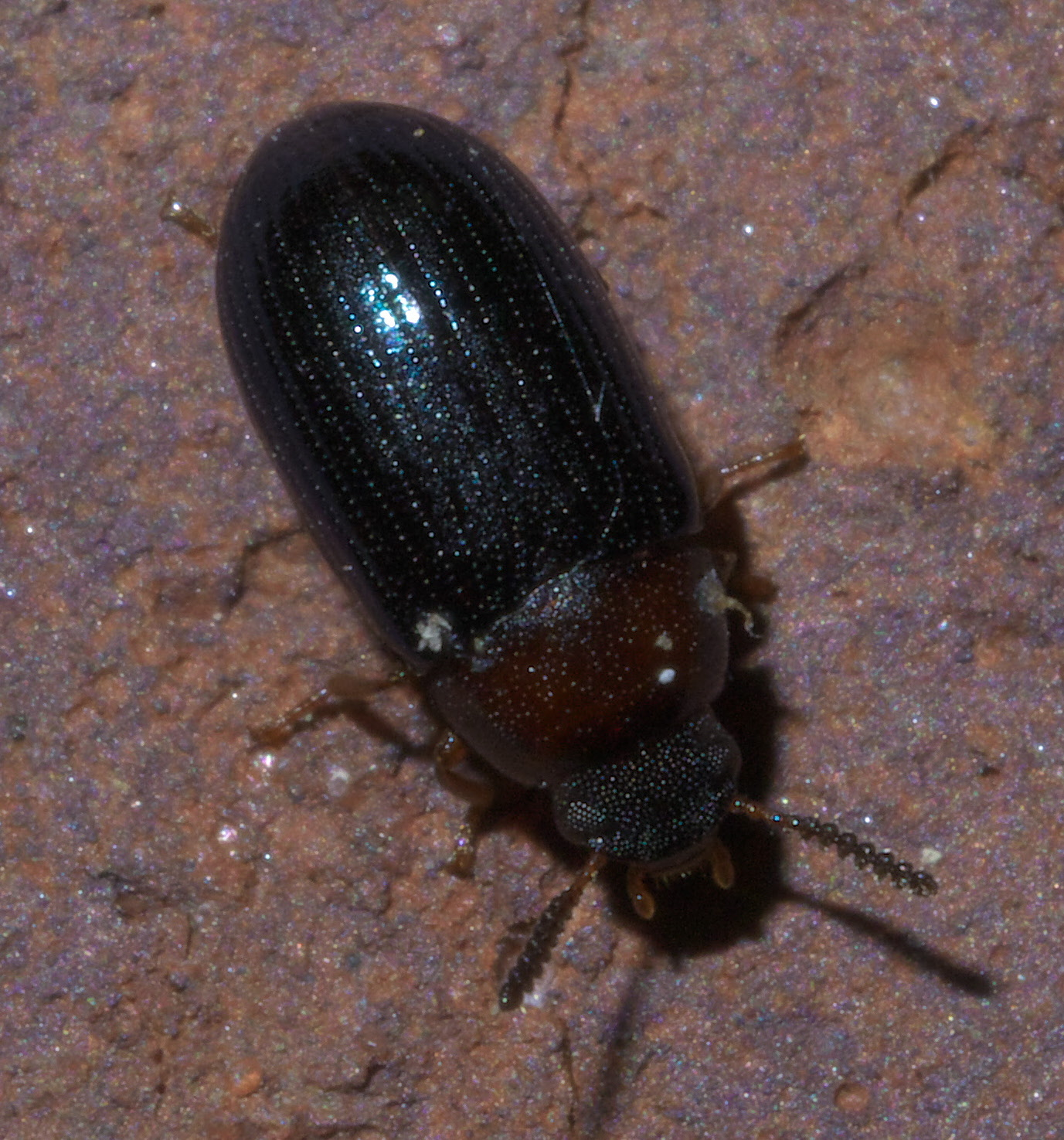
- Carphoborus bicornus

Scientific classification
- Kingdom: Animalia
- Phylum: Arthropoda
- Clade: Pancrustacea
- Class: Insecta
- Order: Coleoptera
- Suborder: Polyphaga
- Infraorder: Cucujiformia
- Family: Curculionidae
- Subfamily: Scolytinae
- Tribe: Hylesinini; Erichson, 1836

= Hylesinini =

Tribe of beetles

Hylesinini is a tribe of crenulate bark beetles in the family Curculionidae. There are at least 20 genera and 80 described species in Hylesinini.

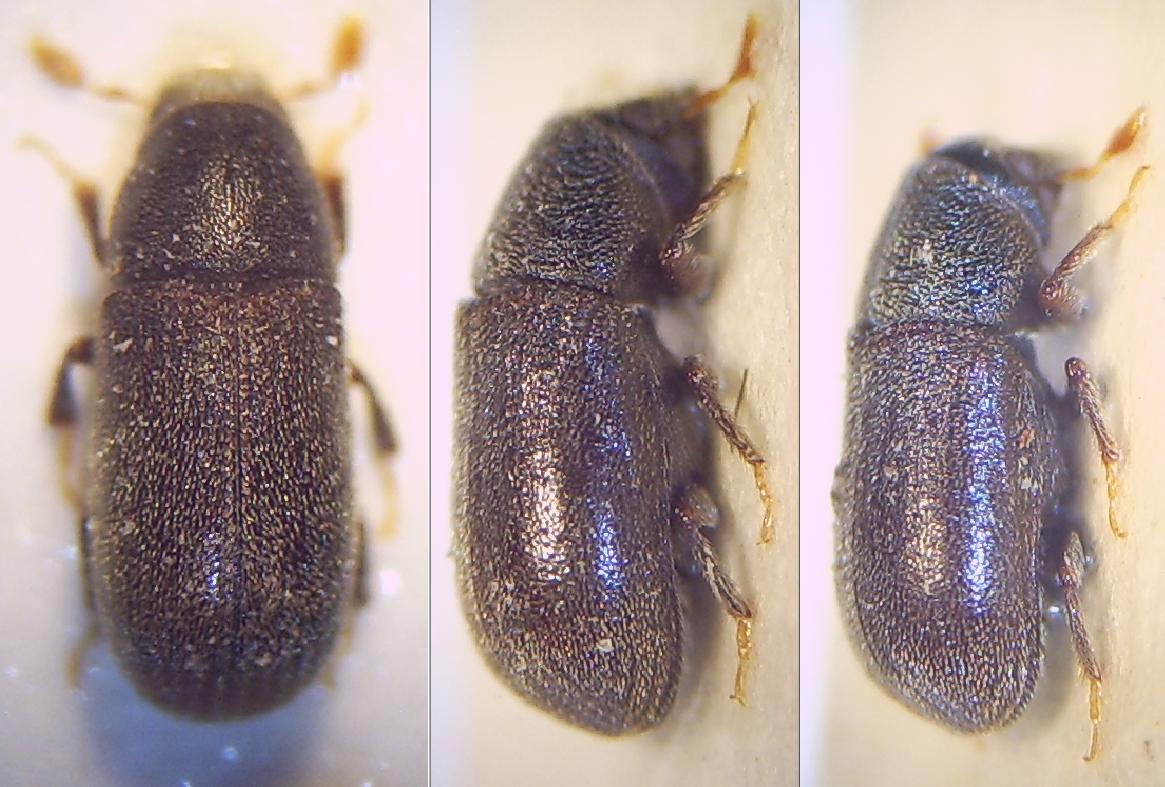
Polygraphus

== Genera ==
These 23 genera belong to the tribe Hylesinini:

- Alniphagus Swaine, 1918^{i c g b}
- Carphobius Blackman, 1943^{i c g b}
- Carphoborus Eichhoff, 1864^{i c g b}
- Chaetophloeus Leconte, 1876^{i c g b}
- Chramesus LeConte, 1868^{i c g b}
- Cnesinus LeConte, 1868^{i c g b}
- Dendroctonus Erichson, 1836^{i c g b}
- Dendrosinus Chapuis, 1869^{i c g b}
- Hylastes Erichson, 1836^{i c g b}
- Hylastinus Bedel, 1888^{i c g b}
- Hylesinus Fabricius, 1801^{i c g b}
- Hylurgopinus Swaine, 1918^{i c g b}
- Hylurgops LeConte, 1876^{i c g b}
- Hylurgus Latreille, 1807^{c g b}
- Liparthrum Wollaston, 1864^{i c g b}
- Pagiocerus Eichhoff, 1868^{i c g b}
- Phloeosinus Chapuis, 1869^{i c g b} (cedar bark beetles)
- Phloeotribus Latreille, 1804^{i c g b}
- Polygraphus Erichson, 1836^{i c g b}
- Pseudohylesinus Swaine, 1917^{i c g b}
- Scierus LeConte, 1876^{i c g b}
- Tomicus Latreille, 1802^{c g b}
- Xylechinus Chapuis, 1869^{i c g b}

Data sources: i = ITIS, c = Catalogue of Life, g = GBIF, b = Bugguide.net
