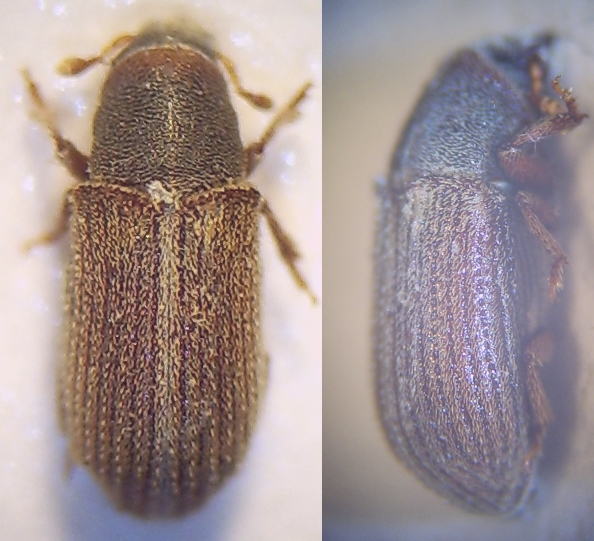
- Adult Xylechinus pilosus from above (left) and from the side

Scientific classification
- Domain: Eukaryota
- Kingdom: Animalia
- Phylum: Arthropoda
- Class: Insecta
- Order: Coleoptera
- Suborder: Polyphaga
- Infraorder: Cucujiformia
- Family: Curculionidae
- Subfamily: Scolytinae
- Tribe: Tomicini; Thomson, 1839

Genera
- Several, see text

Synonyms
- Tomicina

= Tomicini =

Tribe of beetles

Tomicini are a tribe of bark beetles, highly specialized weevils of the subfamily Scolytinae. They belong to the group of tribes around the Hylesinini, which are all included in these by some authors. In this case, the Tomicini become a subtribe Tomicina.

This tribe contains a number of notorious pests, in particular of conifers; even by bark beetle standards, some Tomicini are unusually destructive and can cause massive amounts of damage during outbreaks. Some Tomicini have spread from their native range with shipments of forestry produce and established themselves as invasive species.

== Genera ==
- Chaetoptelius
- Dendroctonus
- Dendrotrupes
- Hylurdrectonus
- Hylurgonotus
- Hylurgopinus
- Hylurgus
- Pachycotes
- Pseudohylesinus
- Pseudoxylechinus
- Sinophloeus
- Tomicus (= Blastophagus, Myelophilus)
- Xylechinosomus
- Xylechinus
