= List of Chramesus species =

This is a list of 108 species in the genus Chramesus.

== Chramesus species ==
- Chramesus aberrans Schedl, 1951m
- Chramesus acacicolens Wood, 1969b
- Chramesus acuteclavatus Hagedorn, 1909a
- Chramesus advena Schedl, 1951m
- Chramesus annectens Schedl, 1963h
- Chramesus aquilus Wood, 1974a
- Chramesus argentinae Wood, 2007
- Chramesus argentinensis Schedl, 1952a
- Chramesus asperatus Schaeffer, 1908
- Chramesus aspericollis Schedl, 1938i
- Chramesus asperulus Schedl, 1978c
- Chramesus atkinsoni Wood, 1981
- Chramesus atlanticus Bright & Torres, 2006
- Chramesus badius Schedl, 1951m
- Chramesus barbatus Eggers, 1930a
- Chramesus bicolor Wood, 1967b
- Chramesus bispinus Wood, 1982a
- Chramesus bolivianus Schedl, 1973a
- Chramesus brasiliensis Nunberg, 1962
- Chramesus brevisetosus Bright, 1972d
- Chramesus canus Blackman, 1938b
- Chramesus cecropiae Wood, 1969b
- Chramesus chapuisi LeConte, 1876
- Chramesus chapuisii
- Chramesus corniger Wood, 1974a
- Chramesus corumbensis Eggers, 1951
- Chramesus crenatus Wood, 1956c
- Chramesus cristatus Schedl, 1963d
- Chramesus cylindricus Schedl, 1952a
- Chramesus demissus Wood, 1967b
- Chramesus dentatus Schaeffer, 1908
- Chramesus dentellus Wood, 2007
- Chramesus denticulatus Wood, 1971
- Chramesus dentipes Schedl, 1978c
- Chramesus deplanatus Eggers, 1940a
- Chramesus disparilis Wood, 1974a
- Chramesus editus Wood & Bright, 1992
- Chramesus erinaceus Schedl, 1967d
- Chramesus eurypterus Schedl, 1963d
- Chramesus exilis Wood, 1983a
- Chramesus exul Wood, 1983a
- Chramesus fletchmanni Petrov & Mandelshtam, 2011
- Chramesus gibber Blackman, 1938b
- Chramesus globosus Hagedorn, 1909a
- Chramesus globulus Stebbing, E.P., 1909b
- Chramesus gracilis Wood, 1969b
- Chramesus granulatus Schedl, 1963f
- Chramesus granulipennis Schedl, 1959m
- Chramesus hicoriae LeConte, 1868
- Chramesus hylurgoides Schedl, 1963d
- Chramesus impolitus Wood, 1971
- Chramesus imporcatus Wood, 1971
- Chramesus incomptus Wood, 1967d
- Chramesus ingens Wood, 1969b
- Chramesus luteus Wood, 2007
- Chramesus macrocornis Wood, 1971
- Chramesus marginatus Wood, 1974a
- Chramesus mexicanus Schedl, 1948f
- Chramesus microporosus Wood, 1974a
- Chramesus mimosae Blackman, 1938
- Chramesus minor Eggers, 1951
- Chramesus minulus Wood, 1969c
- Chramesus neglectus Schedl, 1978c
- Chramesus nitidus Eggers, 1940a
- Chramesus opacicollis Eggers, 1940a
- Chramesus orinocensis Wood, 1971
- Chramesus ovalis Schedl, 1952a
- Chramesus panamensis Blackman, 1943c
- Chramesus parcus Wood, 1971
- Chramesus peniculus Wood, 1971
- Chramesus periosus Wood, 1969b
- Chramesus peruanus Schedl, 1961i
- Chramesus phloeosinites Schedl, 1951m
- Chramesus phloeotriboides Schedl, 1958f
- Chramesus priscus Wood, 1971
- Chramesus pumilus Schwarz, E.A., 1886
- Chramesus punctatus Wood, 1967b
- Chramesus quadridens Wood, 1956c
- Chramesus robustus Schedl, 1948f
- Chramesus rotundatus Wood & Bright, 1992
- Chramesus schoenmanni Petrov & Mandelshtam, 2011
- Chramesus securus Wood, 1983a
- Chramesus secus Wood, 1969b
- Chramesus semibrunneus Eggers, 1951
- Chramesus setiger Schedl, 1951m
- Chramesus setosus Wood, 1960
- Chramesus signatipennis Schedl, 1962r
- Chramesus simplicis Wood, 1971
- Chramesus solicitatus Wood, 1971
- Chramesus spinosus Brèthes, 1921b
- Chramesus striatus Eggers, 1943a
- Chramesus strigatus Wood, 1960b
- Chramesus strigilis Wood, 1971
- Chramesus subopacus Schaeffer, 1908
- Chramesus subtuberculatus Eggers, 1951
- Chramesus tibialis Wood, 1983a
- Chramesus tuberculatus Wood & Bright, 1992
- Chramesus tumidulus Blandford, 1897a
- Chramesus unicornis Wood, 1969b
- Chramesus variabilis Wood, 1974a
- Chramesus variegatus Eggers, 1943a
- Chramesus varius Wood, 1969b
- Chramesus vastus Wood, 1967b
- Chramesus vinealis Wood, 1971
- Chramesus vitiosus Wood, 1969c
- Chramesus wisteriae Wood, 1974
- Chramesus xalapae Atkinson, 1989
- Chramesus xylophagus Wood, 1956c
