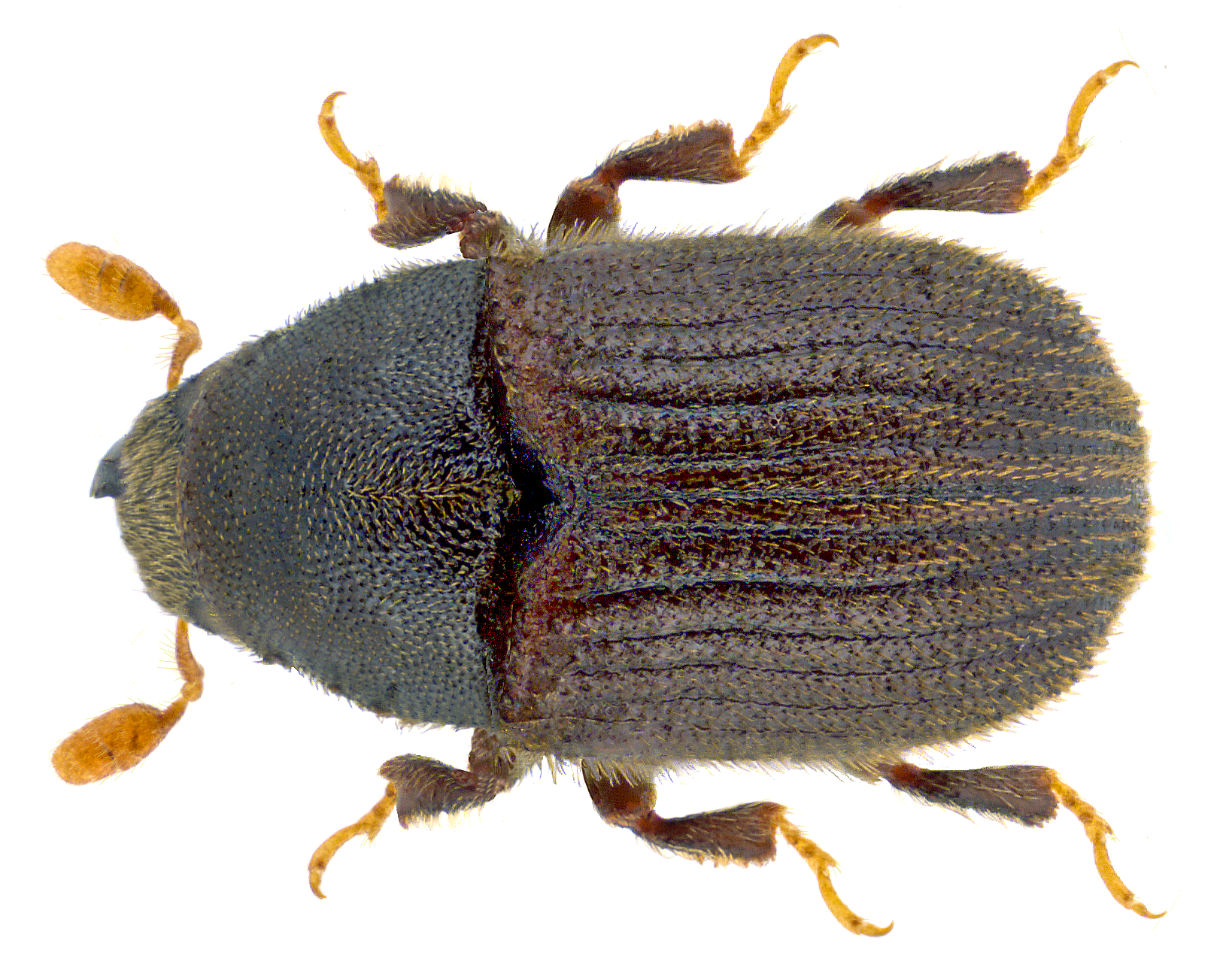

Scientific classification
- Kingdom: Animalia
- Phylum: Arthropoda
- Class: Insecta
- Order: Coleoptera
- Suborder: Polyphaga
- Infraorder: Cucujiformia
- Family: Curculionidae
- Subfamily: Scolytinae
- Tribe: Phloeosinini; Nüsslin, 1912

= Phloeosinini =

Tribe of beetles

Phloeosinini is the tribe of bark beetles which includes the genera Carphotoreus, Catenophorus, Chramesus, Cladoctonus, Cortisinus, Dendrosinus, Hyledius, Hyleops, Paleosinus, Phloeocranus, Phloeoditica, Phloeosinopsioides, Phloeosinus, Protosinus and Pseudochramesus.
