= Hylesinus fasciatus =

Scientific classification
- Kingdom: Animalia
- Phylum: Arthropoda
- Clade: Pancrustacea
- Class: Insecta
- Order: Coleoptera
- Suborder: Polyphaga
- Infraorder: Cucujiformia
- Family: Curculionidae
- Subfamily: Scolytinae
- Tribe: Hylesinini
- Genus: Hylesinus
- Species: H. fasciatus

Binomial name
- Hylesinus fasciatus LeConte, 1868

Species of beetle

Hylesinus fasciatus is a species of crenulate bark beetle in the family Curculionidae. It is found in North America.
