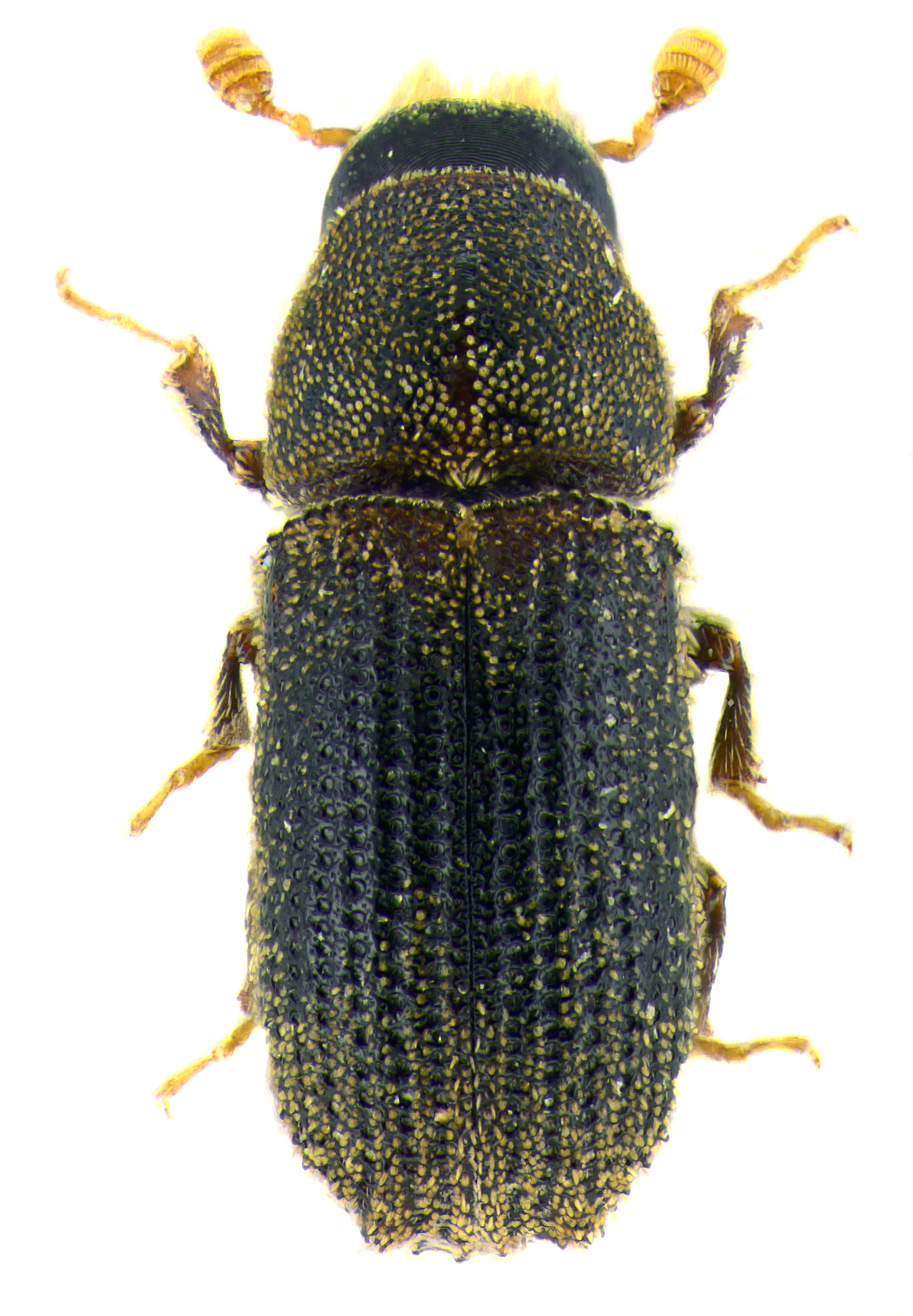
- Carphoborus cholodkovskyi

Scientific classification
- Domain: Eukaryota
- Kingdom: Animalia
- Phylum: Arthropoda
- Class: Insecta
- Order: Coleoptera
- Suborder: Polyphaga
- Infraorder: Cucujiformia
- Family: Curculionidae
- Tribe: Hylesinini
- Genus: Carphoborus

= Carphoborus =

Genus of beetles

Carphoborus is a genus of crenulate bark beetles within the family Curculionidae. There are at least 40 described species of beetles in Carphoborus.

== Species ==
These 49 species belong to the genus Carphoborus:

- Carphoborus abachidsei Stark, V.N., 1952^{c}
- Carphoborus africanus Nunberg, 1964b^{c}
- Carphoborus andersoni Swaine, 1919^{i c}
- Carphoborus ater Schedl (Eggers in), 1979c^{c}
- Carphoborus attritus Peyerimhoff, 1931^{c}
- Carphoborus balgensis Murayama, 1943b^{c}
- Carphoborus bicornis Wood, 1986^{i c}
- Carphoborus bicornus^{b}
- Carphoborus bicristatus Chapuis, 1869^{c}
- Carphoborus bifurcus Eichhoff, 1868^{i c}
- Carphoborus blaisdelli Swaine, 1924^{i c b}
- Carphoborus bonnairei Brisout, C., 1884^{c}
- Carphoborus borealis Karpinski, 1933b^{c}
- Carphoborus boswelliae Wood & Bright, 1992^{c}
- Carphoborus brevisetosus Wood, 1954^{i c}
- Carphoborus carri Swaine, 1917^{i c b}
- Carphoborus cholodkovskyi Spessivtsev, P., 1916^{c}
- Carphoborus convexifrons Wood, 1954^{i c}
- Carphoborus costatus Wichmann, H.E., 1915a^{c}
- Carphoborus cressatyi Bruck, 1936b^{c}
- Carphoborus declivis Wood, 1943^{i c b}
- Carphoborus dunni Swaine, 1924^{i c}
- Carphoborus engelmanni Wood, 1951b^{c}
- Carphoborus frontalis Wood, 1954^{i c b}
- Carphoborus henscheli Reitter, 1887b^{c}
- Carphoborus intermedius Wood, 1954^{i c}
- Carphoborus jurinskii Eggers, 1910e^{c}
- Carphoborus kushkensis Sokanovskii, B.V., 1954^{c}
- Carphoborus latus Wood, 1988b^{c}
- Carphoborus marani Pfeffer, 1941e^{c}
- Carphoborus mexicanus Bright, 1972b^{c}
- Carphoborus minimus (Fabricius, J.C., 1798)^{c g}
- Carphoborus perplexus Wood, 1960^{i c}
- Carphoborus perrisi Wood & Bright, 1992^{c g}
- Carphoborus piceae Wood, 1974^{i c}
- Carphoborus pini Eichhoff, 1881a^{c}
- Carphoborus pinicolens Wood, 1954^{i c}
- Carphoborus ponderosae Swaine, 1924^{i c}
- Carphoborus pseudotsugae Wood, 1943^{i c}
- Carphoborus radiatae Swaine, 1918^{i c}
- Carphoborus rossicus Semenov Tjan-Shansky, A.P., 1902^{c}
- Carphoborus sansoni Swaine, 1924^{i c}
- Carphoborus simplex LeConte, 1876^{i c b}
- Carphoborus swainei Bruck, 1933b^{c}
- Carphoborus taireiensis Murayama, 1943b^{c}
- Carphoborus teplouchovi Spessivtsev, P., 1916^{c}
- Carphoborus tuberculatus Bright, 1964^{c}
- Carphoborus vandykei Bruck, 1933^{i c}
- Carphoborus zhobi Wood & Bright, 1992^{c}

Data sources: i = ITIS, c = Catalogue of Life, g = GBIF, b = Bugguide.net
