= Pagiocerus =

Scientific classification
- Kingdom: Animalia
- Phylum: Arthropoda
- Clade: Pancrustacea
- Class: Insecta
- Order: Coleoptera
- Suborder: Polyphaga
- Infraorder: Cucujiformia
- Family: Curculionidae
- Tribe: Hylesinini
- Genus: Pagiocerus; Eichhoff, 1868

Genus of beetles

Pagiocerus is a genus of crenulate bark beetles in the family Curculionidae. There is at least one described species in Pagiocerus, P. frontalis.
