= Cnesinus elegans =

Scientific classification
- Kingdom: Animalia
- Phylum: Arthropoda
- Class: Insecta
- Order: Coleoptera
- Suborder: Polyphaga
- Infraorder: Cucujiformia
- Family: Curculionidae
- Genus: Cnesinus
- Species: C. elegans

Binomial name
- Cnesinus elegans (Blandford, 1896e)

Species of beetle

Cnesinus elegans is a species of beetles in the family Scolytinae. It is found in Mexico.
