= Hylesinus californicus =

Scientific classification
- Kingdom: Animalia
- Phylum: Arthropoda
- Clade: Pancrustacea
- Class: Insecta
- Order: Coleoptera
- Suborder: Polyphaga
- Infraorder: Cucujiformia
- Family: Curculionidae
- Genus: Hylesinus
- Species: H. californicus

Binomial name
- Hylesinus californicus (Swaine, 1916)

Species of beetle

Hylesinus californicus, the western ash bark beetle, is a species of crenulate bark beetle in the family Curculionidae. It is found in North America.
