= Dendrosinus bourreriae =

Scientific classification
- Kingdom: Animalia
- Phylum: Arthropoda
- Clade: Pancrustacea
- Class: Insecta
- Order: Coleoptera
- Suborder: Polyphaga
- Infraorder: Cucujiformia
- Family: Curculionidae
- Genus: Dendrosinus
- Species: D. bourreriae

Binomial name
- Dendrosinus bourreriae Schwarz, 1920

Species of beetle

Dendrosinus bourreriae is a species of crenulate bark beetle in the family Curculionidae. It is found in North America.
