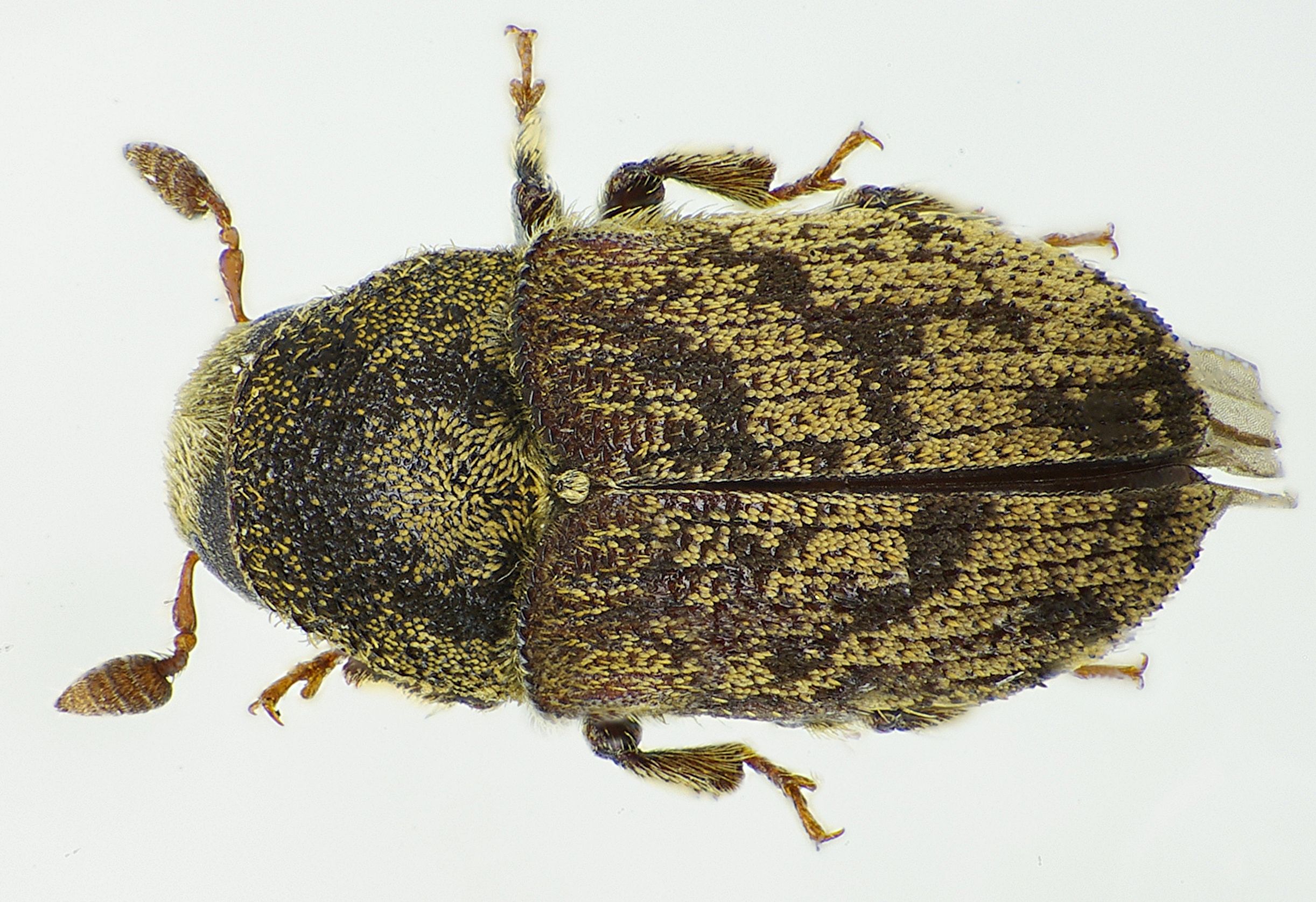

Scientific classification
- Kingdom: Animalia
- Phylum: Arthropoda
- Clade: Pancrustacea
- Class: Insecta
- Order: Coleoptera
- Suborder: Polyphaga
- Infraorder: Cucujiformia
- Superfamily: Curculionoidea
- Family: Curculionidae
- Genus: Hylesinus
- Species: H. fraxini

Binomial name
- Hylesinus fraxini (Panzer, 1779)

= Hylesinus fraxini =

Species of beetle

Hylesinus fraxini, formerly Leperisinus varius (Fabricius, 1775) is a species of weevil from the subfamily Scolytinae. The species is widespread in Europe, their range reaching to the Ural Mountains.

== Appearance ==
Hylesinus fraxini grow to a length of 2.5 to 3.5 millimeters (0.25 centimeters to 0.35 centimeters). The pronotum is granulated at the front and does not cover the head when viewed from above. The upper side of the body is covered with mottled, yellow-brown scales overlapping each other. This give the species its German name, Bunter Eschenbastkäfer (Colorful Ash Bark Beetle). Its elytra have fine, regular rows of small indentations. At the base of the elytra, there are small bumps between the second row of spots. The rest of the elytra features rows of granules. Its antennae have seven segments. Its clavate antenna are long, pointed, and have two faint seams. Male have eight tergites on their abdomen, while females have seven.

Side	Front	Underside	Overside

== Behavior ==
Hylesinus fraxini can typically be found on Fraxinus ornus, Fraxinus americana, and occasionally on Olea europaea, Juglans, Quercus robur, Pyrus, Malus, Robinia pseudoacacia, Fagus, Acer, Corylus avellana, Carpinus betulus, and Syringa vulgaris. It inhabits the bark of trees, including the area around the bark. The brood pattern has a relatively short, vertical entrance tunnel, from which a horizontal, double armed cross-passage breaks off. The larval tunnels run vertically, are densely packed, and usually only four centimeters long. The pupal chambers and tunnels are easy to see after the bark has fallen off or been removed. The beetles feed under the green bark in the crown or young poles. This initially leaves small crab-like spots, then causes bark growth, which are called "beetle scabs." The animals hibernate in these growths. One generation develops per year, with a flight period from March to May, starting at an air temperature of 16 °C (60.8 °F). The new generation emerges in July and August. The insects emerge in large numbers.

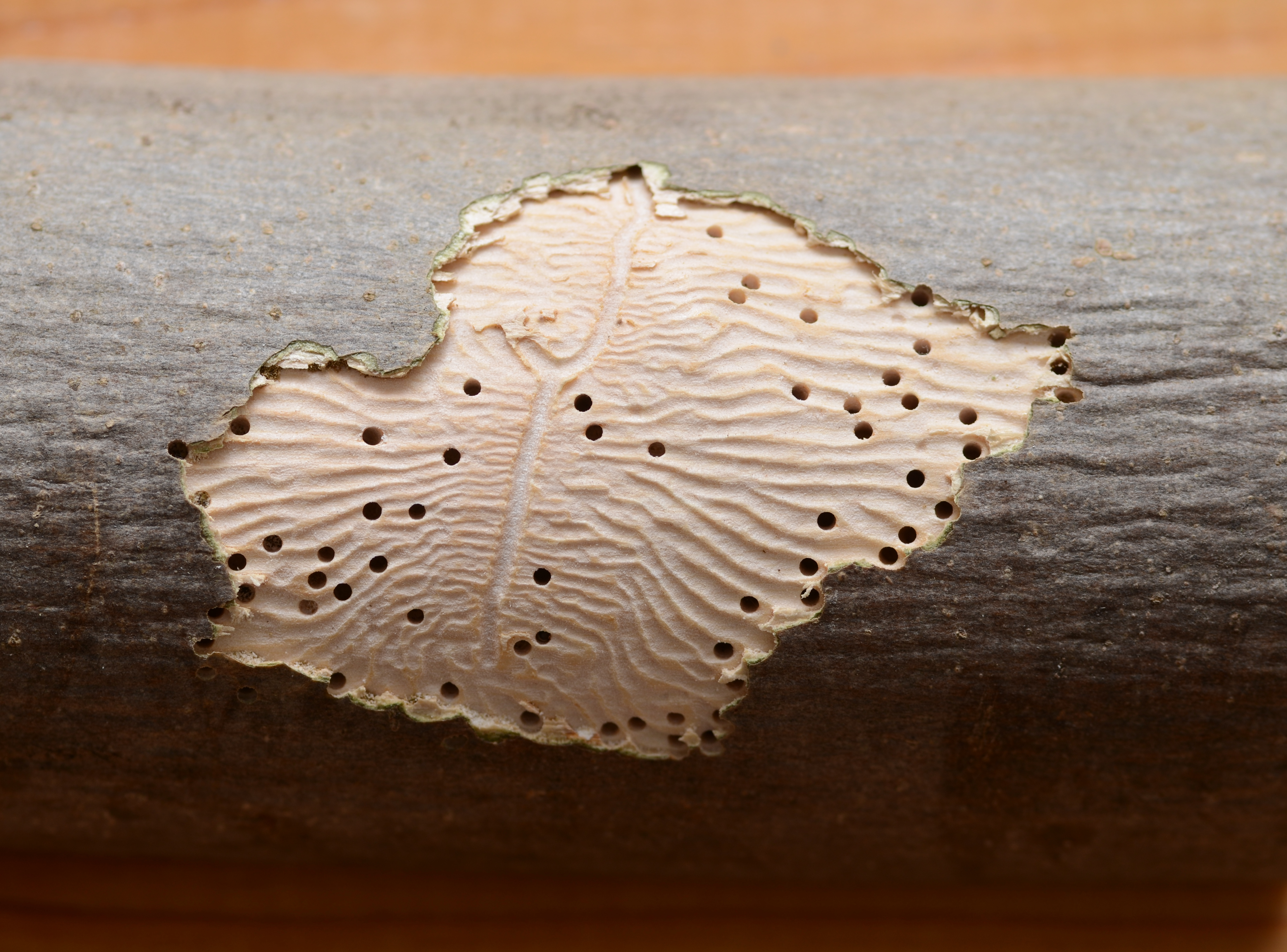
