= Phloeoditica =

Scientific classification
- Kingdom: Animalia
- Phylum: Arthropoda
- Class: Insecta
- Order: Coleoptera
- Suborder: Polyphaga
- Infraorder: Cucujiformia
- Family: Curculionidae
- Tribe: Phloeosinini
- Genus: Phloeoditica

Genus of beetles

Phloeoditica is a genus of bark beetles in the Phloeosinini tribe. Species includes Phloeoditica curta and Phloeoditica elegans.

Although previously classified in Phloeoditica, Phloeoditica obscura was transferred to Pseudodiamerus by Wood (1988). In 2010 the species Phloeoditica setosus was transferred to Pseudoxylechinus and a new genus Asiophilus was created for Phloeoditica phloeosinoides.

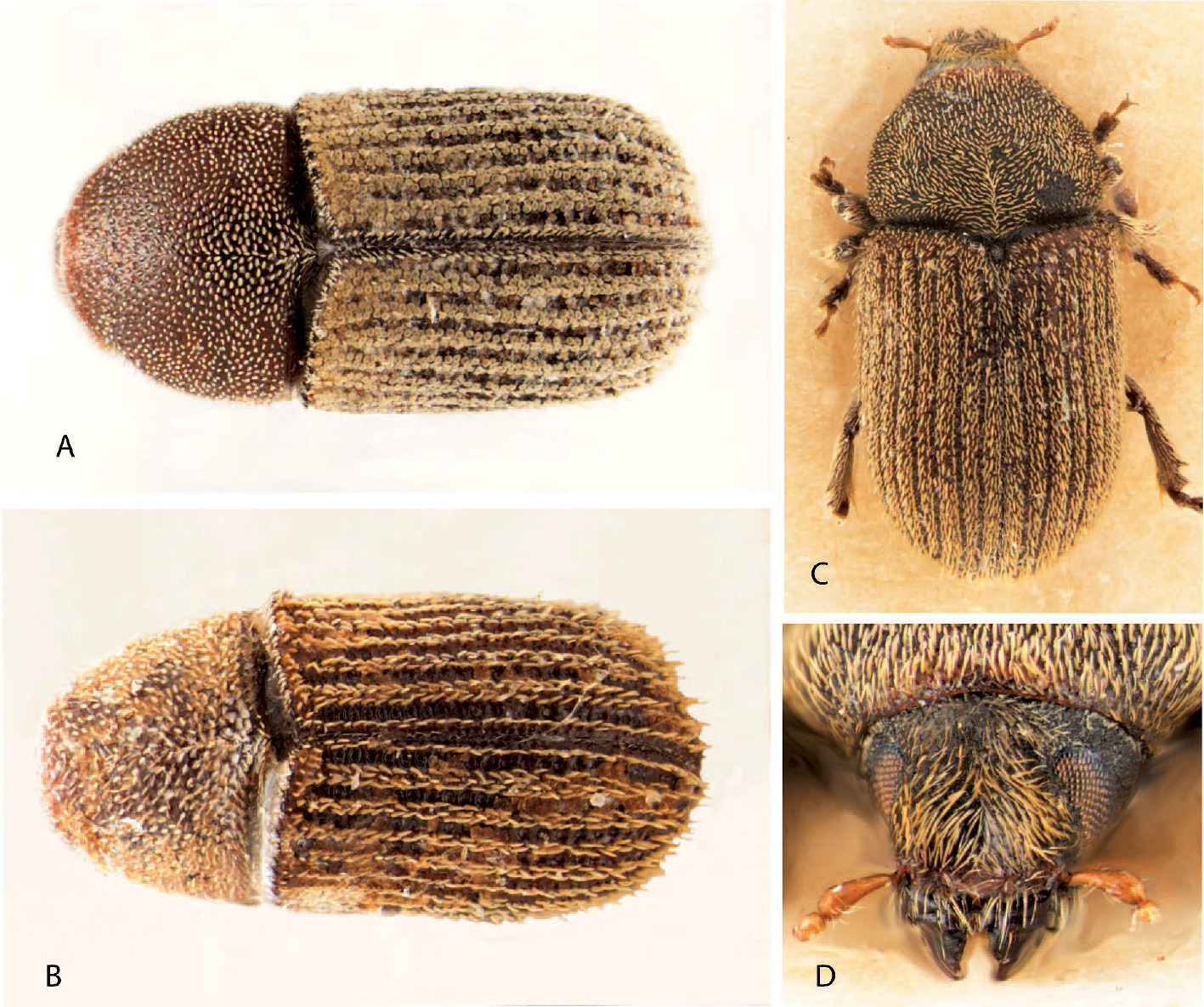
Dorsal and frontal view of Phloeoditica curta (A), Phloeoditica elegans (B), Pseudoxylechinus setosus (C, D).
