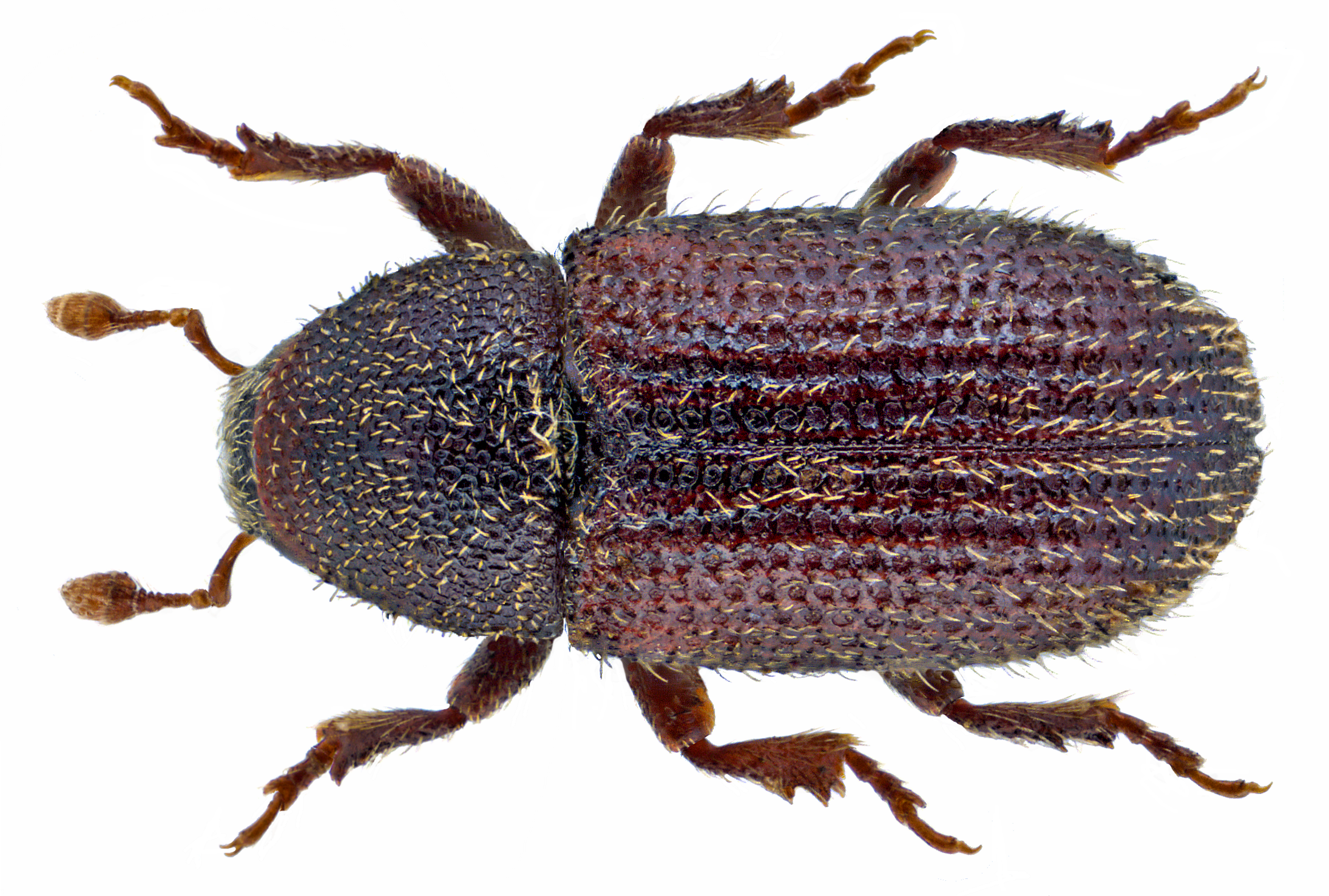
- Hylastinus obscurus

Scientific classification
- Domain: Eukaryota
- Kingdom: Animalia
- Phylum: Arthropoda
- Class: Insecta
- Order: Coleoptera
- Suborder: Polyphaga
- Infraorder: Cucujiformia
- Family: Curculionidae
- Tribe: Hylesinini
- Genus: Hylastinus; Bedel, 1888

= Hylastinus =

Genus of beetles

Hylastinus is a genus of crenulate bark beetles in the family Curculionidae. There are about 11 described species in Hylastinus.

== Species ==
These 11 species belong to the genus Hylastinus:

- Hylastinus achillei Reitter, 1894a
- Hylastinus croaticus Fuchs, 1912
- Hylastinus eichhoffi Schedl (Eggers in), 1960b
- Hylastinus elongatus Schedl (Eggers in), 1960b
- Hylastinus fankhauseri Reitter, 1894a
- Hylastinus fiorii Eggers, 1908c
- Hylastinus granulatus Schedl (Eggers in), 1960b
- Hylastinus kroaticus Fuchs, 1912a
- Hylastinus obscurus (Marsham, 1803) (clover root borer)
- Hylastinus pilosus Eggers, 1944c
- Hylastinus tiliae Semenov Tjan-Shansky & A.P., 1902
