= Chramesus subopacus =

Scientific classification
- Kingdom: Animalia
- Phylum: Arthropoda
- Clade: Pancrustacea
- Class: Insecta
- Order: Coleoptera
- Suborder: Polyphaga
- Infraorder: Cucujiformia
- Family: Curculionidae
- Genus: Chramesus
- Species: C. subopacus

Binomial name
- Chramesus subopacus Schaeffer, 1908

Species of beetle

Chramesus subopacus is a species of crenulate bark beetle in the family Curculionidae. It is found in North America.
