= Alniphagus =

Scientific classification
- Domain: Eukaryota
- Kingdom: Animalia
- Phylum: Arthropoda
- Class: Insecta
- Order: Coleoptera
- Suborder: Polyphaga
- Infraorder: Cucujiformia
- Family: Curculionidae
- Tribe: Hylesinini
- Genus: Alniphagus; Swaine, 1918

Genus of beetles

Alniphagus is a genus of crenulate bark beetles in the family Curculionidae. There are about eight described species in Alniphagus.

== Species ==
These eight species belong to the genus Alniphagus:

- Alniphagus africanus Schedl, 1963h
- Alniphagus alni Wood & Bright, 1992
- Alniphagus aspericollis (LeConte, 1876) (alder bark beetle)
- Alniphagus costatus Mandelshtam, Petrov & Barclay, 2008
- Alniphagus hirsutus Schedl, 1949
- Alniphagus imitator Sokanovskii & B.V., 1958
- Alniphagus padus Beeson, 1961
- Alniphagus scutulatus Schedl, 1963
