= Carphobius =

Scientific classification
- Domain: Eukaryota
- Kingdom: Animalia
- Phylum: Arthropoda
- Class: Insecta
- Order: Coleoptera
- Suborder: Polyphaga
- Infraorder: Cucujiformia
- Family: Curculionidae
- Tribe: Hylesinini
- Genus: Carphobius; Blackman, 1943

Genus of beetles

Carphobius is a genus of crenulate bark beetles in the family Curculionidae. There are at least three described species in Carphobius.

== Species ==
These three species belong to the genus Carphobius:

- Carphobius arizonicus Blackman, 1943
- Carphobius cupressi Wood, 1974a
- Carphobius pilifer Wood, 1983a
