= Pseudohylesinus sericeus =

Scientific classification
- Domain: Eukaryota
- Kingdom: Animalia
- Phylum: Arthropoda
- Class: Insecta
- Order: Coleoptera
- Suborder: Polyphaga
- Infraorder: Cucujiformia
- Family: Curculionidae
- Genus: Pseudohylesinus
- Species: P. sericeus

Binomial name
- Pseudohylesinus sericeus (Mannerheim, 1843)

Species of beetle

Pseudohylesinus sericeus, the silver fir beetle, is a species of crenulate bark beetle in the family Curculionidae. It is found in North America.
