= Scierus =

Scientific classification
- Kingdom: Animalia
- Phylum: Arthropoda
- Class: Insecta
- Order: Coleoptera
- Suborder: Polyphaga
- Infraorder: Cucujiformia
- Family: Curculionidae
- Tribe: Hylesinini
- Genus: Scierus; LeConte, 1876

Genus of beetles

Scierus is a genus of crenulate bark beetles in the family Curculionidae. There are at least three described species in Scierus.

== Species ==
These three species belong to the genus Scierus:

- Scierus annectans LeConte, 1876
- Scierus annectens LeConte, 1876
- Scierus pubescens Swaine, 1924
