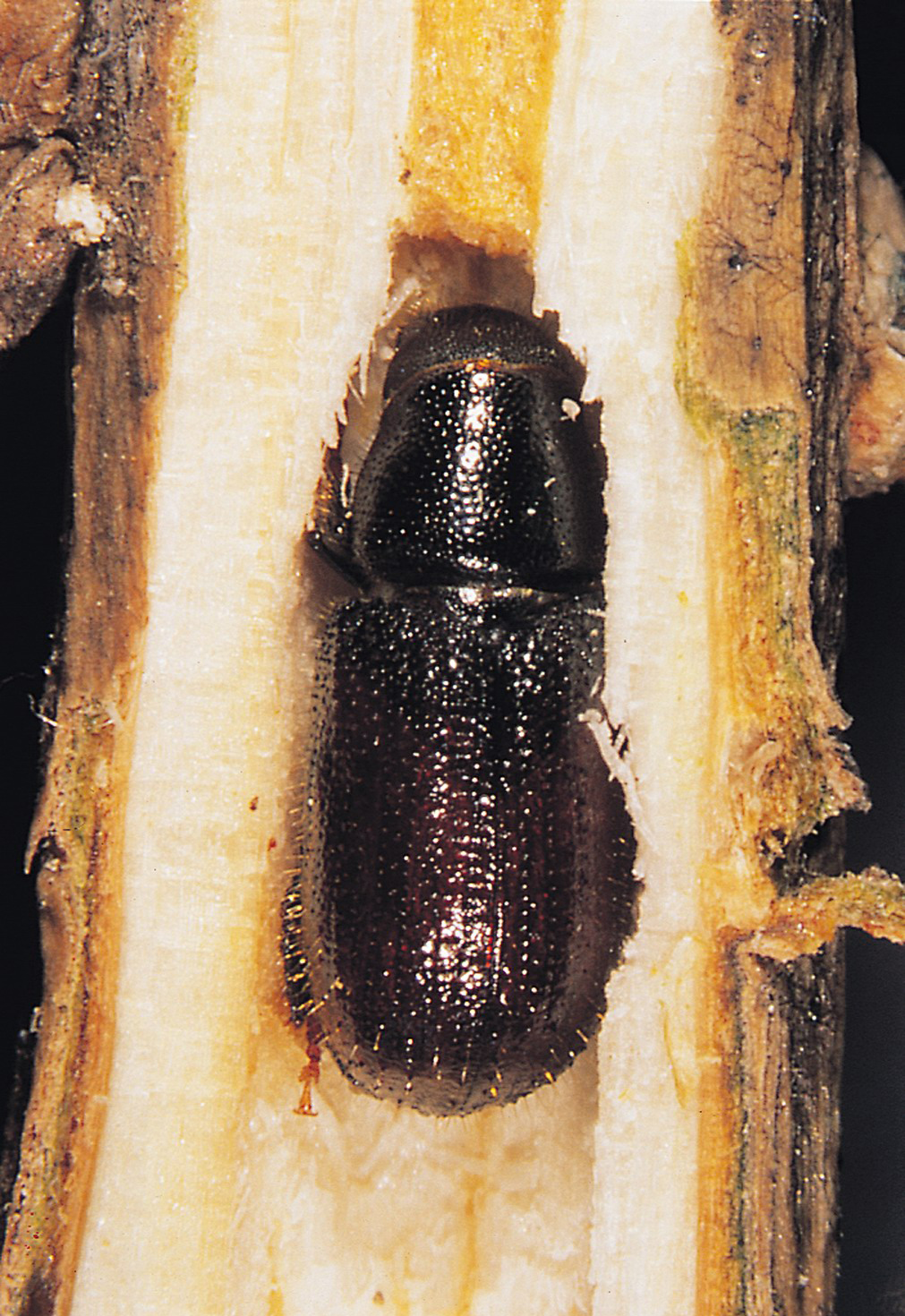
- Adult feeding in pine shoot, Hungary

Scientific classification
- Kingdom: Animalia
- Phylum: Arthropoda
- Clade: Pancrustacea
- Class: Insecta
- Order: Coleoptera
- Suborder: Polyphaga
- Infraorder: Cucujiformia
- Family: Curculionidae
- Genus: Tomicus
- Species: T. piniperda

Binomial name
- Tomicus piniperda (Linnaeus, 1758)

Synonyms
- Dermestes piniperda; Myelophilus piniperda

= Tomicus piniperda =

Species of beetle

Tomicus piniperda, the common pine shoot beetle, is a bark beetle native throughout Europe, northwestern Africa, and northern Asia. It is one of the most destructive shoot-feeding species in northern Europe.

Its primary host plant is Scots pine Pinus sylvestris, but it also uses European black pine P. nigra, maritime pine P. pinaster, eastern white pine P. strobus, red pine P. resinosa, jack pine P. banksiana and other pines to a small extent, and more rarely on spruce Picea and larch Larix. Scots pine is the most important forest tree species in East-central Europe, with Scots pine occupying 68% of total forest area in Poland, making T. piniperda an important pest.

== Description ==
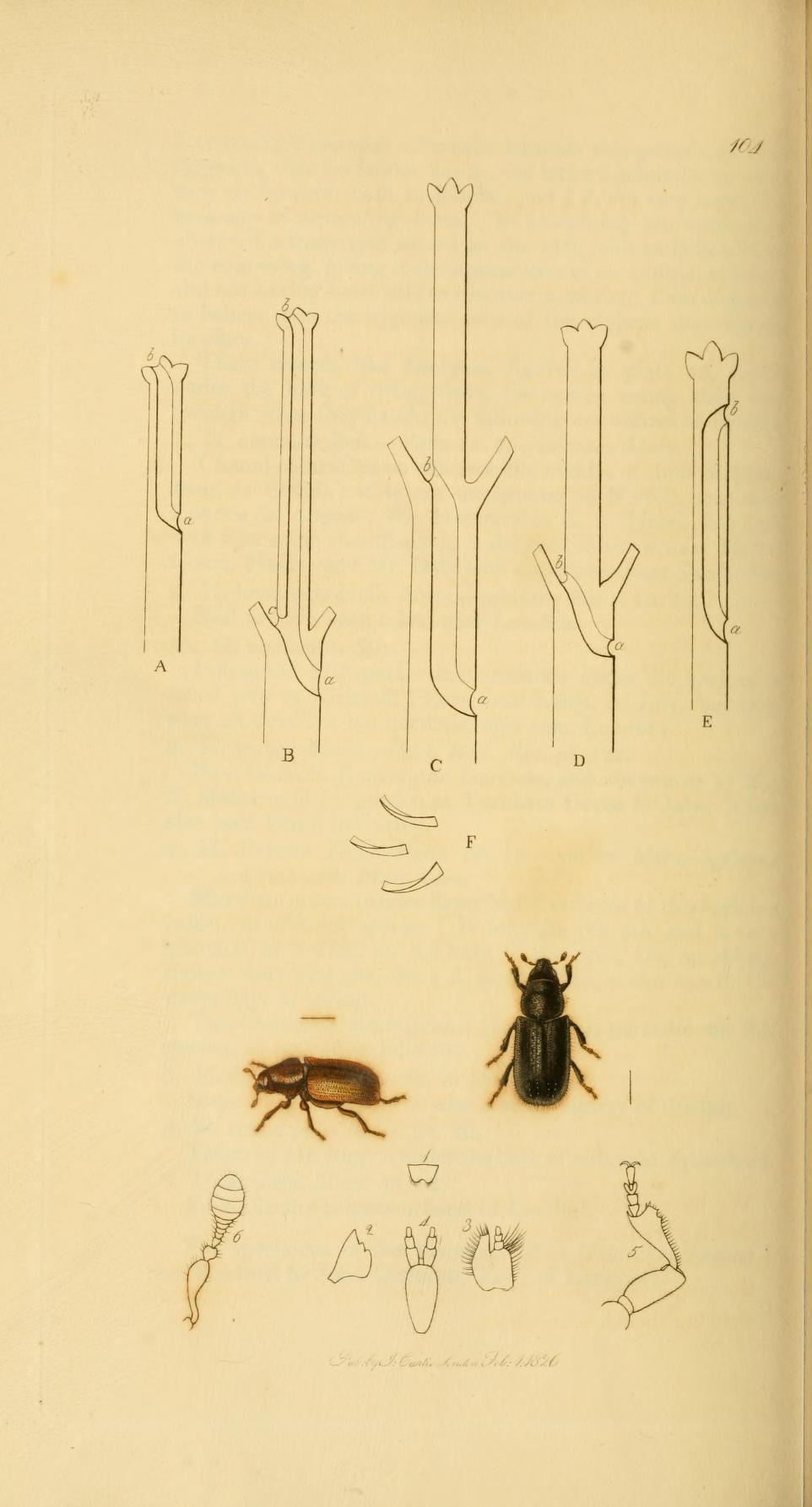
Pine shoot galleries. Plate from John Curtis's British Entomology

T. piniperda is black or dark brown, 3.5–4.8 mm long, with a cylindrical body, rounded at the head and abdomen ends. It breeds in recently dead and dying trees, most often in windblown trees lying on the ground but also in fire-killed standing trees. The adults tunnel a breeding gallery in the spring, up to 25 cm (9.8 in) long, parallel to the wood grain where they lay their eggs. On hatching, the larvae chew through the phloem radially from the gallery for several months, emerging as new adults in late summer. The adults then feed through the autumn and winter on the pith in strong apical shoots of healthy young trees, killing the bored-out shoots. This does not kill the tree, but causes damage to the growth form, lowering the economic value of the timber by reducing growth rates and stem straightness. They are also capable of damaging trees by infesting the trunk of the tree. There is one generation per year, with most adults dying after breeding many times, though a few survive to breed again a year later. In late winter to early spring, when daily high temperatures exceed 10–13 °C (50–55 °F), adults initiate flight from their overwintering sites and seek breeding material as a host, including recently cut pine trees, logs, branches, and stumps.

== Taxonomy ==
Species closely related to Tomicus piniperda include Tomicus minor (lesser pine shoot beetle), with a similar distribution but ecologically separated, using standing dead pines and with its breeding galleries across the grain, not parallel to it; Tomicus destruens in the Mediterranean region, which differs in details of ecology, infesting primarily stone pine P. pinea and maritime pine P. pinaster; and Tomicus yunnanensis in southwestern China on Yunnan pine Pinus yunnanensis. Historically, these species were often not distinguished from T. piniperda, but they are reproductively isolated, which has consequences for pest control.

== Behaviour ==
T. piniperda has two main patterns of trunk attack. One method of attack that adults employ is to aggregate in the tree crowns first and then infest the trunk for breeding. A second method of attack is when adults directly attack without aggregating within the shoot. For either method of attack, colonisation success depends on the degree of tree resistance that the beetles encounter. Aggregation occurs towards the end of the shoot-feeding period, which intersects with the weakening of the tree. This explains the successful mass attacks that take place in the bole of trees and kills them.

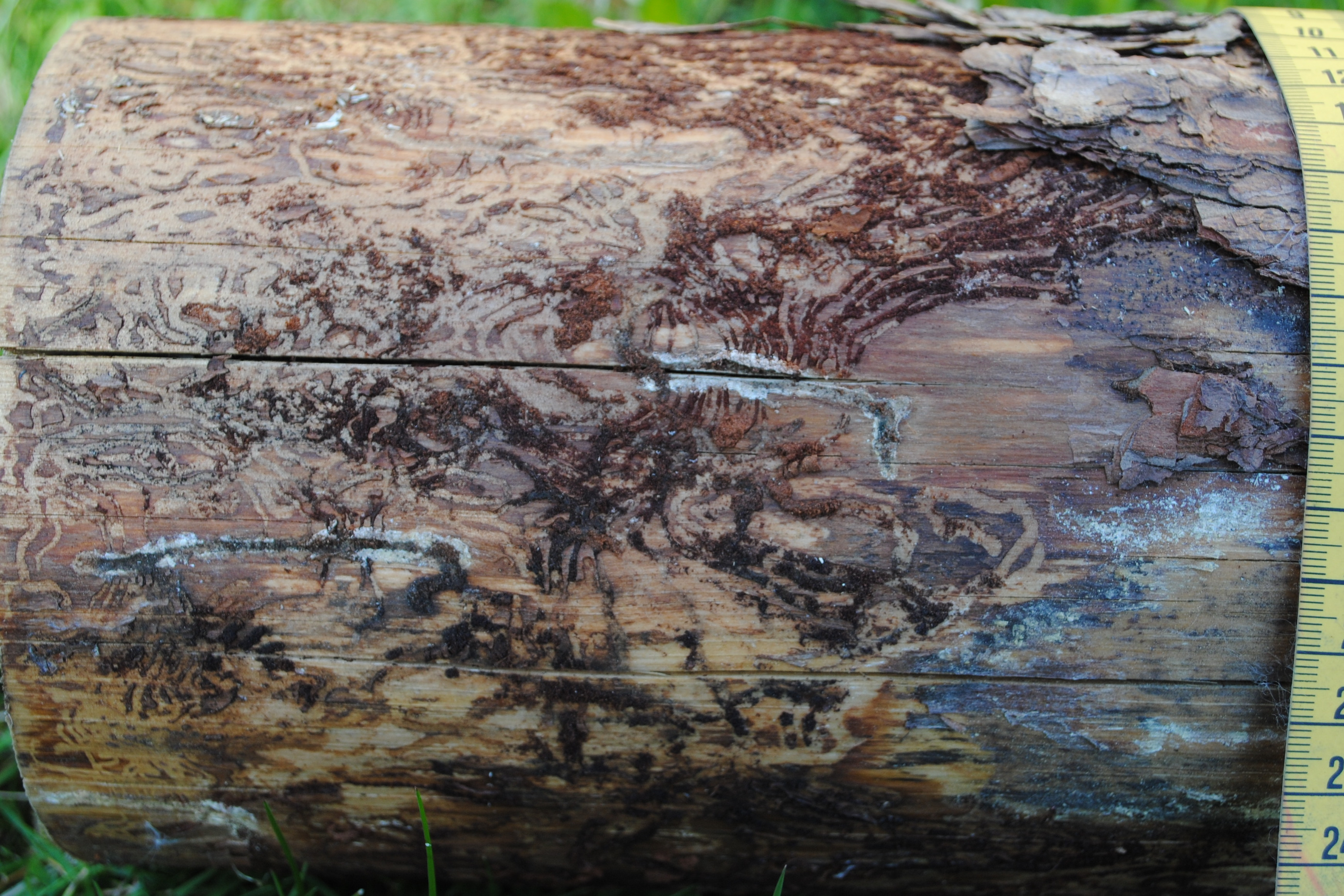
Damage to a log by T. piniperda

=== Olfactory recognition ===
Unlike most bark beetles, Tomicus piniperda does not use pheromones for pre-beeding association and pairing, but instead hones in on the resin scent emitted by damaged specimens of the host species, including storm-fallen Scots pines. These trees are homes to bark beetles because of an injured vascular system that can not provide adequate resin to defend against new attacks by beetles. T. piniperda is able to recognize smells while still in flight by means of olfaction of several different plant monoterpenes evaporating from wound resin. These monoterpenes include alpha-pinene, 3-carene, terpinolene, and myrcene. The presence of other T. piniperda beetles did not influence the attraction of these beetles to trees. Both sexes respond similarly to a concentration range of each monoterpene, although myrcene was not as attractive to the beetles as the other monoterpenes. In addition to Scots pines trees, these beetles are also able to respond to volatiles released from logs and other types of trees, including the Norway spruce. However, the concentrations of monoterpenes found in Norway spruces are lower than in Scots pines, which in part explains why these beetles are more likely to select Scots pines as a host.

This behaviour is especially important in Northern Europe and Scandinavia, where it is the most important insect pest of pines. The beetle typically swarms in the spring before other bark beetle species that infest pines, and as a result is successful in competing for the limited number of wind thrown and less resistance pines in which the beetle almost exclusively breeds. Their mass aggregation in these pines is due to their ability to respond swiftly to monoterpenes that are released from injuries to the trees. This allows these beetles to locate mates quickly, even when these beetles are not able to utilise pheromones.

=== Interactions with other species ===
In many places, T. piniperda coexists with other species in the trunks of pines. As a result, T. piniperda distributes itself among the tree to avoid conflict. They are found with the highest density near the top of tree trunks and towards the ground. Rarely, they may fully occupy the entirety of the trunk surface. They are most likely to attack the tree at increasing heights and lay their eggs there. This is unlike other species, such as T. minor, which as a species is more likely to attack the mid and base trunk and lay their eggs there. T. minor attack patterns are heavily regulated by T. piniperda attacks because T. minor attacks occur 1–2 weeks later than T. piniperda attacks. Thus, T. minor attacks trees that are already infested by T. piniperda and are forced to take parts of the trees that haven't been attacked yet. T. minor affects T. piniperda influencing pupal survival. In addition, both benefit mutually from each other if tree resistance is high. Similar interactions occur between T. destruens and T. piniperda in Europe and Mediterranean regions.

=== Population genetics ===
In Europe, the population of these beetles living in Mediterranean areas differ from the populations of other areas. While T. piniperda causes damage to various pine species throughout Northern Europe, trees in the Mediterranean are especially vulnerable and may even be killed. Larvae in the Mediterranean have a few characteristics that separate it from other populations of T. piniperda, but adults are morphologically identical. There have been debates about whether to consider Mediterranean T. piniperda as a separate species. Several characteristics of T. piniperda make it a good candidate for local adaptive structure. These include mate location that takes place on a host plant, larval development being completed on one individual host, and selection pressures being highly variable between hosts, which magnify the strength of the insect-host plant relationship.

Studies have found that T. piniperda from the Mediterranean that were sequenced are structured into two haplotypic groups. One group corresponds to most insects collected in Northern Europe (France) whereas the second group corresponds more similarly to Mediterranean insect populations. This distribution of T. piniperda suggests that this beetle can be split into two separate species. This is further confirmed by the distance between the two haplotypic groups being similar to the distance between T. piniperda and T. minor. Furthermore, the intra-group distances of the two haplotypic groups are compatible with intra-specific variation commonly observed in insects.

== Invasive problems ==
The beetle has been introduced accidentally to northeastern North America, where it has become an invasive species. Within one month of the initial sighting, five new states reported finding T. piniperda, including Indiana, Pennsylvania, Michigan, New York, and Illinois. The first known occurrence in North America was found in July 1992 at a Christmas tree farm close to Cleveland, Ohio, from where it has spread to 11 states in the United States and to Ontario and Quebec in Canada. The beetle has been identified as a serious pest in the United States. As a precautionary step to help protect pine plantations, a United States federal quarantine was introduced in 1992 in the northeast and north-midwest, regulating movement of pine logs and bark, nursery stock, and Christmas trees from infested to uninfested areas, and a similar quarantine brought in to cover part of southeast Canada in 1993 by the Canadian authorities. Surveys during 1993 and 1994 found several new infested counties but no new infested states. On average, T. piniperda was found in more than 30 new countries per year from 1992 to 2000.

=== Management strategies ===
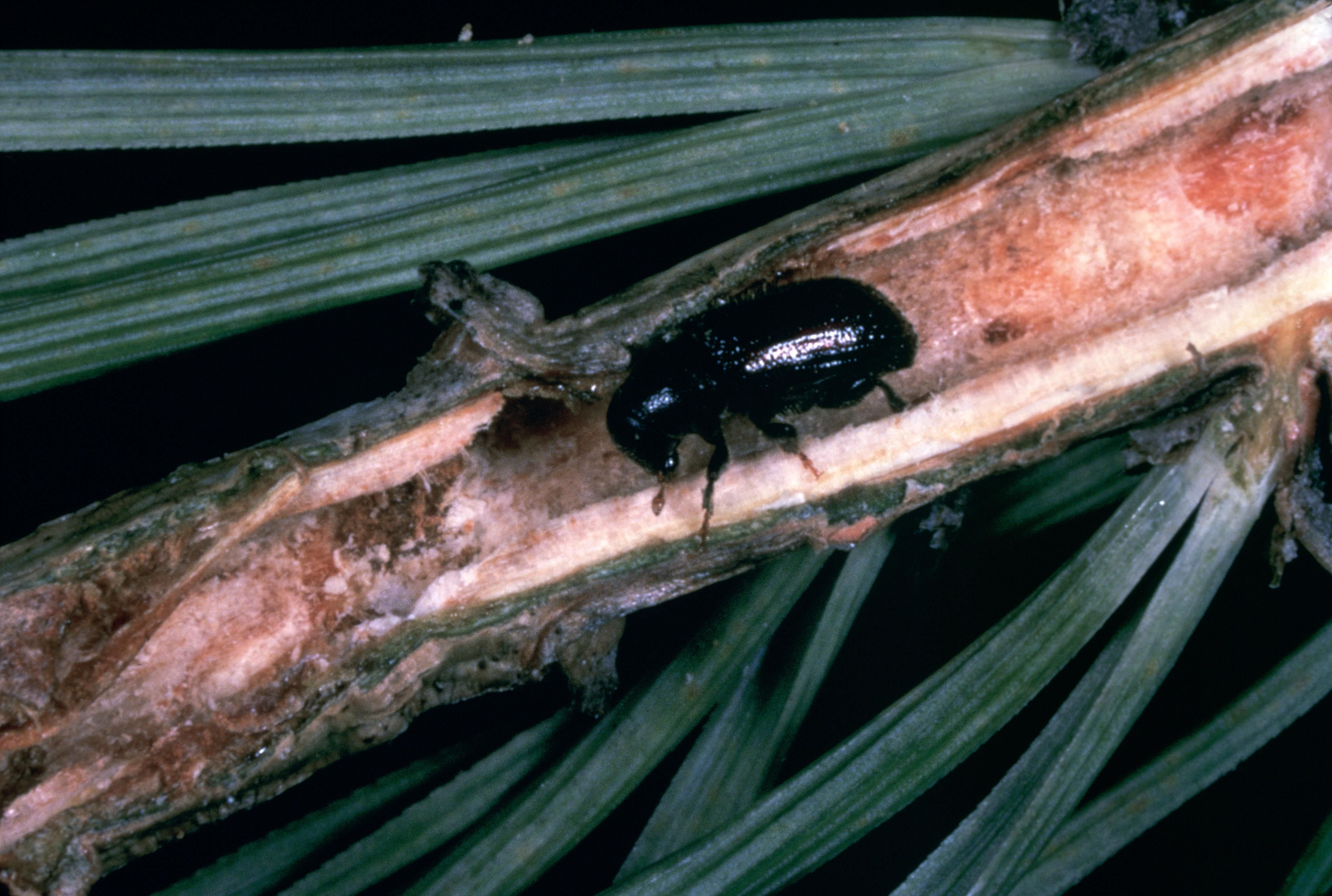
Damage to branches

During September and October 1992, seven states (Florida, Georgia, Kansas, Louisiana, North Carolina, Oregon, and West Virginia) had their own state-wide quarantines on various pine articles from the other infested states. This included allowing importation of regulated articles only after being inspected and declared free of T. piniperda. The federal quarantine disallowed movement of host material from infested areas to non-infested areas within the United States, including logs and lumber with bark from all species of pine. In 1993, stumps from recently cut pine trees were added as a regulated article. These pine stumps were originally used to generate fuel and turpentine. In addition, pine bark, pine Christmas trees, pine wreaths, and pine nursery stock were also considered regulated articles in 1993.

From 1993 to 2000, US states within and near the quarantine zone used a combination of trap logs and monoterpene baited funnel traps to capture parent adults during their initial spring flight. Visual surveys were administered in late summer and autumn to locate the beetles' shoot-feeding damage. After 2000, all infested states have surveyed only with the baited traps in spring and early summer. In Canada, techniques included using a combination of baited traps, trap logs, and visual inspections. In recent years, Canada has also started to use monoterpene baited traps. At United States ports of entry, T. piniperda is regularly found and intercepted. During a 16-year period, this beetle was intercepted 151 times on cargo arriving from at least 18 different countries. Interception data helps to narrow the screening process when working with this beetle that occurs over a wide geographic range.

A single T. piniperda adult found during inspection can make it impossible for producers of Christmas trees to fulfill their contracts. As a result, scientists and regulators developed the Pine Shoot Beetle Compliance Management Program for both pine Christmas trees and nursery stock.

=== Control ===
There are multiple strategies to dealing with a T. piniperda infestation. One method that is used to control T. piniperda physically is to place freshly cut pine logs or other trees in a pine field so that the beetle will attack the killed logs when finding a place to breed. After the end of their breeding period, remove and destroy all infested logs. During the summer and into early autumn, remove and destroy all infested tips. Another method of controlling this beetle is to use permethrin or carbaryl before adult mating flight. This usually occurs on the first warm day in spring. Throughout the summer, continue to treat shoots with permethrin. One of the best methods used to control these insects is to use a summer foliar spray alongside the destruction of brood logs and trees during May.

== Fungal associations ==
As with all bark beetle species, this species is known to associate with a wide range of fungal taxa, including the genera Ceratocystis, Ophiostoma, and Ceratocystiopsis, among others. These fungi are pathogens of Scots pines and help T. piniperda attack them. In addition to fungi, T. piniperda is strongly associated with moulds and yeasts.
