= Chramesus hicoriae =

Scientific classification
- Domain: Eukaryota
- Kingdom: Animalia
- Phylum: Arthropoda
- Class: Insecta
- Order: Coleoptera
- Suborder: Polyphaga
- Infraorder: Cucujiformia
- Family: Curculionidae
- Genus: Chramesus
- Species: C. hicoriae

Binomial name
- Chramesus hicoriae LeConte, 1868

Species of beetle

Chramesus hicoriae is a species of crenulate bark beetle in the family Curculionidae. It is found in North America.
