= Carphoborus simplex =

Scientific classification
- Kingdom: Animalia
- Phylum: Arthropoda
- Class: Insecta
- Order: Coleoptera
- Suborder: Polyphaga
- Infraorder: Cucujiformia
- Family: Curculionidae
- Genus: Carphoborus
- Species: C. simplex

Binomial name
- Carphoborus simplex LeConte, 1876

Species of beetle

Carphoborus simplex is a species of crenulate bark beetle in the family Curculionidae. It is found in North America.
