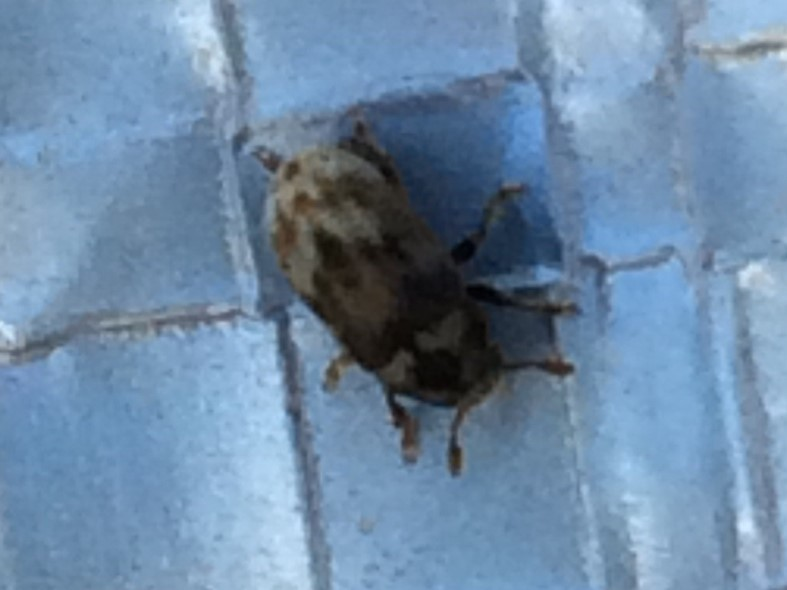

Scientific classification
- Domain: Eukaryota
- Kingdom: Animalia
- Phylum: Arthropoda
- Class: Insecta
- Order: Coleoptera
- Suborder: Polyphaga
- Infraorder: Cucujiformia
- Family: Curculionidae
- Genus: Hylesinus
- Species: H. aculeatus

Binomial name
- Hylesinus aculeatus Say, 1824

= Hylesinus aculeatus =

Species of beetle

Hylesinus aculeatus, the eastern ash bark beetle, is a species of crenulate bark beetle in the family Curculionidae. It is found in North America.
