= Pseudohylesinus nebulosus =

Scientific classification
- Domain: Eukaryota
- Kingdom: Animalia
- Phylum: Arthropoda
- Class: Insecta
- Order: Coleoptera
- Suborder: Polyphaga
- Infraorder: Cucujiformia
- Family: Curculionidae
- Genus: Pseudohylesinus
- Species: P. nebulosus

Binomial name
- Pseudohylesinus nebulosus (LeConte, 1859)

Species of beetle

Pseudohylesinus nebulosus, the douglas-fir pole beetle, is a species of crenulate bark beetle in the family Curculionidae.
