= Chramesus mimosae =

Scientific classification
- Domain: Eukaryota
- Kingdom: Animalia
- Phylum: Arthropoda
- Class: Insecta
- Order: Coleoptera
- Suborder: Polyphaga
- Infraorder: Cucujiformia
- Family: Curculionidae
- Genus: Chramesus
- Species: C. mimosae

Binomial name
- Chramesus mimosae Blackman, 1938

Species of beetle

Chramesus mimosae is a species of crenulate bark beetle in the family Curculionidae. It is found in North America.
