= Carphoborus blaisdelli =

Scientific classification
- Kingdom: Animalia
- Phylum: Arthropoda
- Clade: Pancrustacea
- Class: Insecta
- Order: Coleoptera
- Suborder: Polyphaga
- Infraorder: Cucujiformia
- Family: Curculionidae
- Genus: Carphoborus
- Species: C. blaisdelli

Binomial name
- Carphoborus blaisdelli Swaine, 1924

Species of beetle

Carphoborus blaisdelli is a species of crenulate bark beetle in the family Curculionidae. It is found in North America.
