= Xylechinus montanus =

Scientific classification
- Kingdom: Animalia
- Phylum: Arthropoda
- Clade: Pancrustacea
- Class: Insecta
- Order: Coleoptera
- Suborder: Polyphaga
- Infraorder: Cucujiformia
- Family: Curculionidae
- Genus: Xylechinus
- Species: X. montanus

Binomial name
- Xylechinus montanus Blackman, 1940

Species of beetle

Xylechinus montanus is a species of crenulate bark beetle in the family Curculionidae. It lives in North America.
