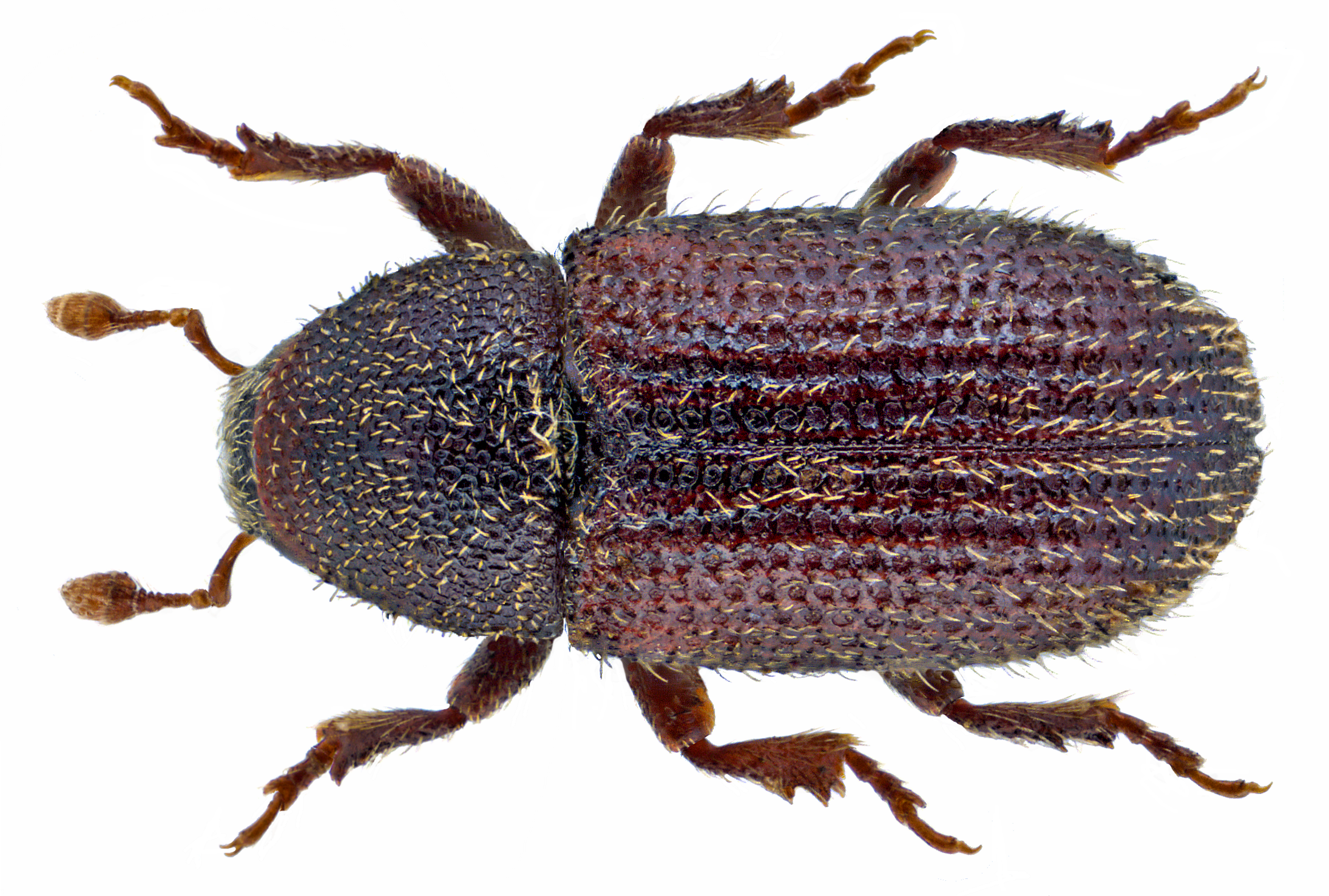

Scientific classification
- Kingdom: Animalia
- Phylum: Arthropoda
- Clade: Pancrustacea
- Class: Insecta
- Order: Coleoptera
- Suborder: Polyphaga
- Infraorder: Cucujiformia
- Family: Curculionidae
- Genus: Hylastinus
- Species: H. obscurus

Binomial name
- Hylastinus obscurus (Marsham, 1803)

= Hylastinus obscurus =

Species of beetle

Hylastinus obscurus, known generally as the clover root borer or clover root rot, is a species of crenulate bark beetle in the family Curculionidae. It is found in North America and Europe.
