= Scierus pubescens =

Scientific classification
- Kingdom: Animalia
- Phylum: Arthropoda
- Clade: Pancrustacea
- Class: Insecta
- Order: Coleoptera
- Suborder: Polyphaga
- Infraorder: Cucujiformia
- Family: Curculionidae
- Genus: Scierus
- Species: S. pubescens

Binomial name
- Scierus pubescens Swaine, 1924

Species of beetle

Scierus pubescens is a species of crenulate bark beetle in the family Curculionidae. It is found in North America.
