= Alniphagus aspericollis =

Scientific classification
- Kingdom: Animalia
- Phylum: Arthropoda
- Class: Insecta
- Order: Coleoptera
- Suborder: Polyphaga
- Infraorder: Cucujiformia
- Family: Curculionidae
- Genus: Alniphagus
- Species: A. aspericollis

Binomial name
- Alniphagus aspericollis (LeConte, 1876)

Species of beetle

Alniphagus aspericollis, the alder bark beetle, is a species of crenulate bark beetle in the family Curculionidae.
