= Hylesinus criddlei =

Scientific classification
- Domain: Eukaryota
- Kingdom: Animalia
- Phylum: Arthropoda
- Class: Insecta
- Order: Coleoptera
- Suborder: Polyphaga
- Infraorder: Cucujiformia
- Family: Curculionidae
- Genus: Hylesinus
- Species: H. criddlei

Binomial name
- Hylesinus criddlei (Swaine, 1918)

Species of beetle

Hylesinus criddlei is a species of crenulate bark beetle in the family Curculionidae. It is found in North America.
