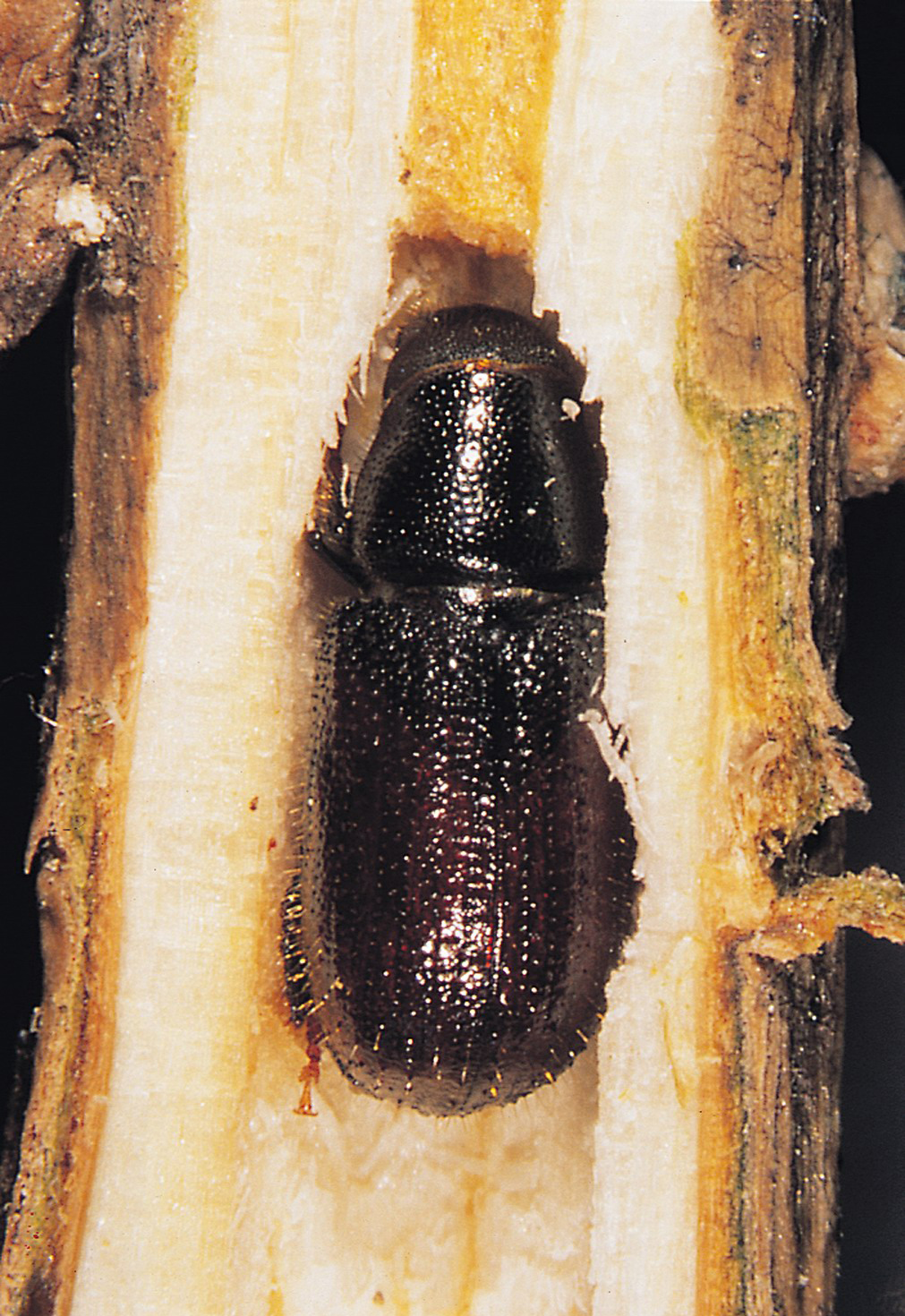

Scientific classification
- Kingdom: Animalia
- Phylum: Arthropoda
- Class: Insecta
- Order: Coleoptera
- Suborder: Polyphaga
- Infraorder: Cucujiformia
- Family: Curculionidae
- Subfamily: Scolytinae
- Tribe: Tomicini
- Genus: Tomicus; Latreille, 1802

= Tomicus =

Genus of beetles

Tomicus is a genus of beetles belonging to the family Curculionidae.

The genus was described in 1802 by Pierre André Latreille.

The genus has cosmopolitan distribution.

Species:

- Tomicus piniperda (Linnaeus, 1758)
