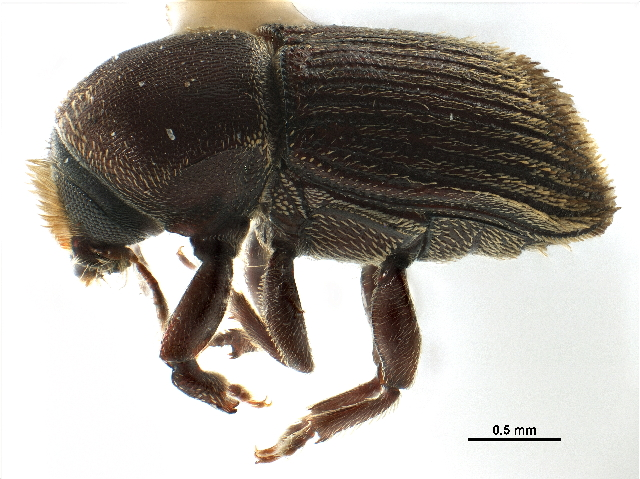
- Cnesinus adusticus

Scientific classification
- Kingdom: Animalia
- Phylum: Arthropoda
- Class: Insecta
- Order: Coleoptera
- Suborder: Polyphaga
- Infraorder: Cucujiformia
- Family: Curculionidae
- Subfamily: Scolytinae
- Genus: Cnesinus; LeConte, 1868

Species
- Several, including: Cnesinus elegans (Blandford, 1896); Cnesinus strigicollis LeConte, 1868

= Cnesinus =

Genus of beetles

Cnesinus is a genus of beetles in the subfamily Scolytinae. Species are from North America, Central America and South America.
