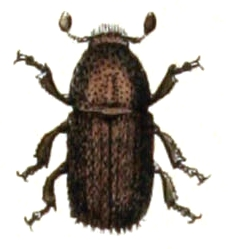
- Polygraphus.poligraphus.-.calwer

Scientific classification
- Kingdom: Animalia
- Phylum: Arthropoda
- Class: Insecta
- Order: Coleoptera
- Suborder: Polyphaga
- Infraorder: Cucujiformia
- Family: Curculionidae
- Genus: Polygraphus; Erichson, 1836

= Polygraphus =

Genus of beetles

Polygraphus is a genus of beetles belonging to the family Curculionidae.

The species of this genus are found in Eurasia and North America.

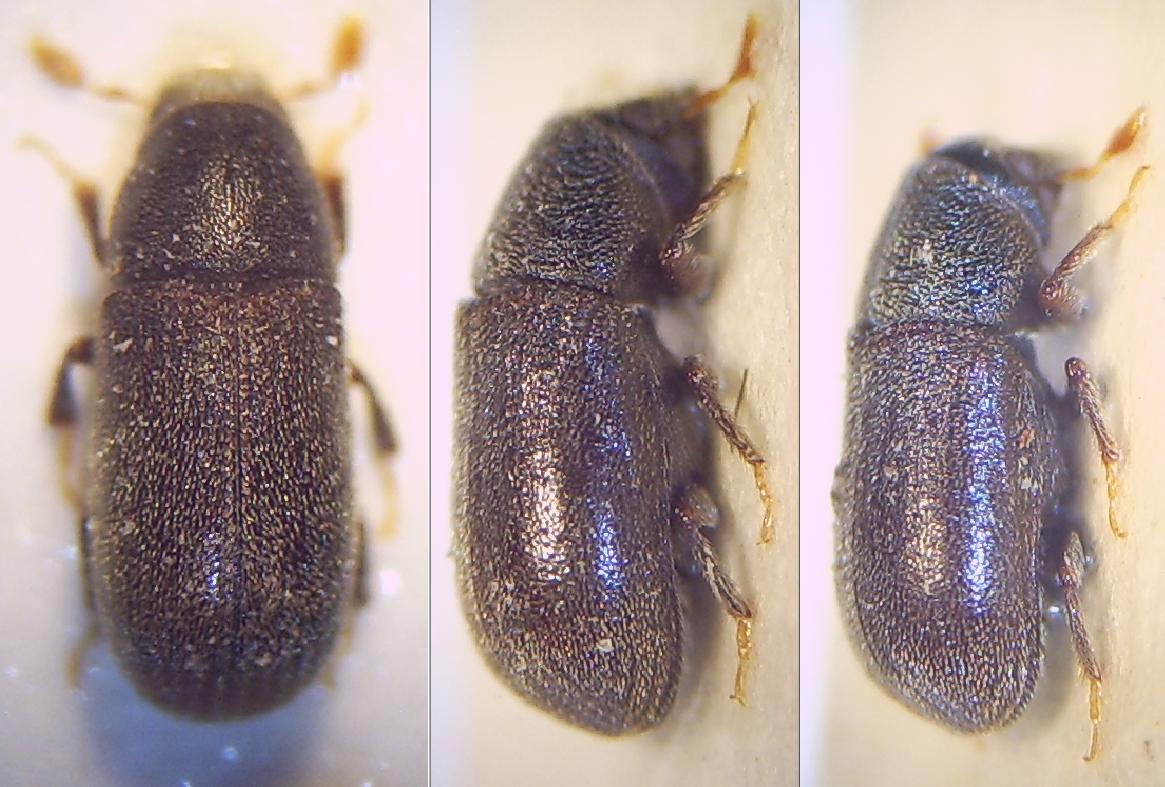
Polygraphus

Species:

- Polygraphus abietis Kurenzov, 1941a
- Polygraphus aequalis Schedl
