= Dendrosinus =

Scientific classification
- Domain: Eukaryota
- Kingdom: Animalia
- Phylum: Arthropoda
- Class: Insecta
- Order: Coleoptera
- Suborder: Polyphaga
- Infraorder: Cucujiformia
- Family: Curculionidae
- Tribe: Hylesinini
- Genus: Dendrosinus; Chapuis, 1869

Genus of beetles

Dendrosinus is a genus of crenulate bark beetles in the family Curculionidae. There are about 12 described species in Dendrosinus.

== Species ==
These 12 species belong to the genus Dendrosinus:

- Dendrosinus ater Eggers, 1930a
- Dendrosinus bonnairei Reitter, 1894c
- Dendrosinus bourreriae Schwarz, 1920
- Dendrosinus globosus Chapuis, 1869
- Dendrosinus hirsutus Schedl
- Dendrosinus lima Eggers, 1930a
- Dendrosinus mexicanus Wood, 1983a
- Dendrosinus paraguayensis Eggers, 1930a
- Dendrosinus puncticollis Blandford, 1897a
- Dendrosinus syrutschcki Wichmann & H.E., 1913a
- Dendrosinus transversalis Blandford, 1897a
- Dendrosinus vittifrons Blandford, 1897a
