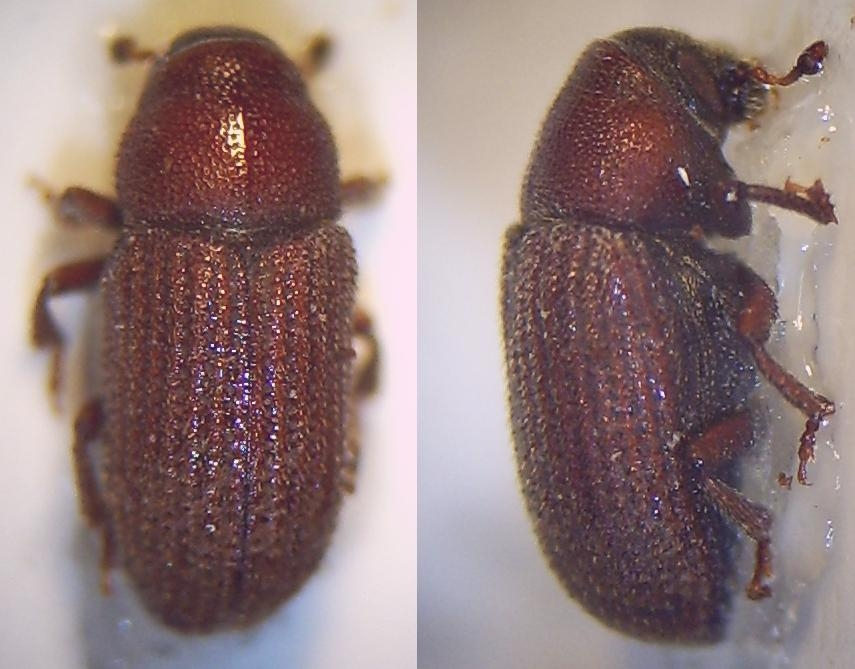
- Hylurgops glabratus

Scientific classification
- Kingdom: Animalia
- Phylum: Arthropoda
- Class: Insecta
- Order: Coleoptera
- Suborder: Polyphaga
- Infraorder: Cucujiformia
- Family: Curculionidae
- Genus: Hylurgops; LeConte, 1876

= Hylurgops =

Genus of beetles

Hylurgops is a genus of beetles belonging to the family Curculionidae. The species of this genus are found in Eurasia and North America.

== Species ==
The following species are recognised in the genus Hylurgops:

- Hylurgops alternans Wood & Bright, 1992
- Hylurgops batnensis Wood & Bright, 1992
- Hylurgops bonvouloiri Wood & Bright, 1992
- Hylurgops corpulentus Schedl, 1947
- Hylurgops dubius Schedl, 1947
- Hylurgops electrinus Wood & Bright, 1992
- Hylurgops eusulcatus Tsai & Huang, 1964
- Hylurgops flohri Eggers, 1930
- Hylurgops fushunensis Murayama, 1940
- Hylurgops glabratus Wood & Bright, 1992
- Hylurgops grandicollis J.M.Swaine, 1917
- Hylurgops granulatus Wood & Bright, 1992
- Hylurgops imitator Reitter, 1913
- Hylurgops incomptus Wood & Bright, 1992
- Hylurgops inouyei Nobuchi, 1959
- Hylurgops interstitialis Wood & Bright, 1992
- Hylurgops junnanicus B.V.Sokanovskii, 1959
- Hylurgops knausi J.M.Swaine, 1917
- Hylurgops lecontei J.M.Swaine, 1917
- Hylurgops likiangensis Tsai & Huang, 1964b
- Hylurgops longipennis Wood & Bright, 1992
- Hylurgops longipilus Wood & Bright, 1992
- Hylurgops major Eggers, 1944
- Hylurgops modestus Murayama, 1937
- Hylurgops niponicus Murayama, 1936
- Hylurgops palliatus Wood & Bright, 1992
- Hylurgops parvus Eggers
- Hylurgops piger H.F.Wickham, 1913
- Hylurgops pilosellus Schedl, 1947
- Hylurgops pinifex Wood & Bright, 1992
- Hylurgops planirostris Wood & Bright, 1992
- Hylurgops porosus Wood & Bright, 1992
- Hylurgops reticulatus Wood, 1972
- Hylurgops rugipennis (Mannerheim, 1843)
- Hylurgops schellwieni Schedl, 1947
- Hylurgops spessivtsevi Eggers, 1914
- Hylurgops squamosus Murayama, 1942
- Hylurgops starki Eggers
- Hylurgops sulcatus Eggers, 1933
- Hylurgops transbaicalicus Eggers, 1941
- Hylurgops tuberculatus Schedl, 1947
- Hylurgops tuberculifer Wood, 1988
