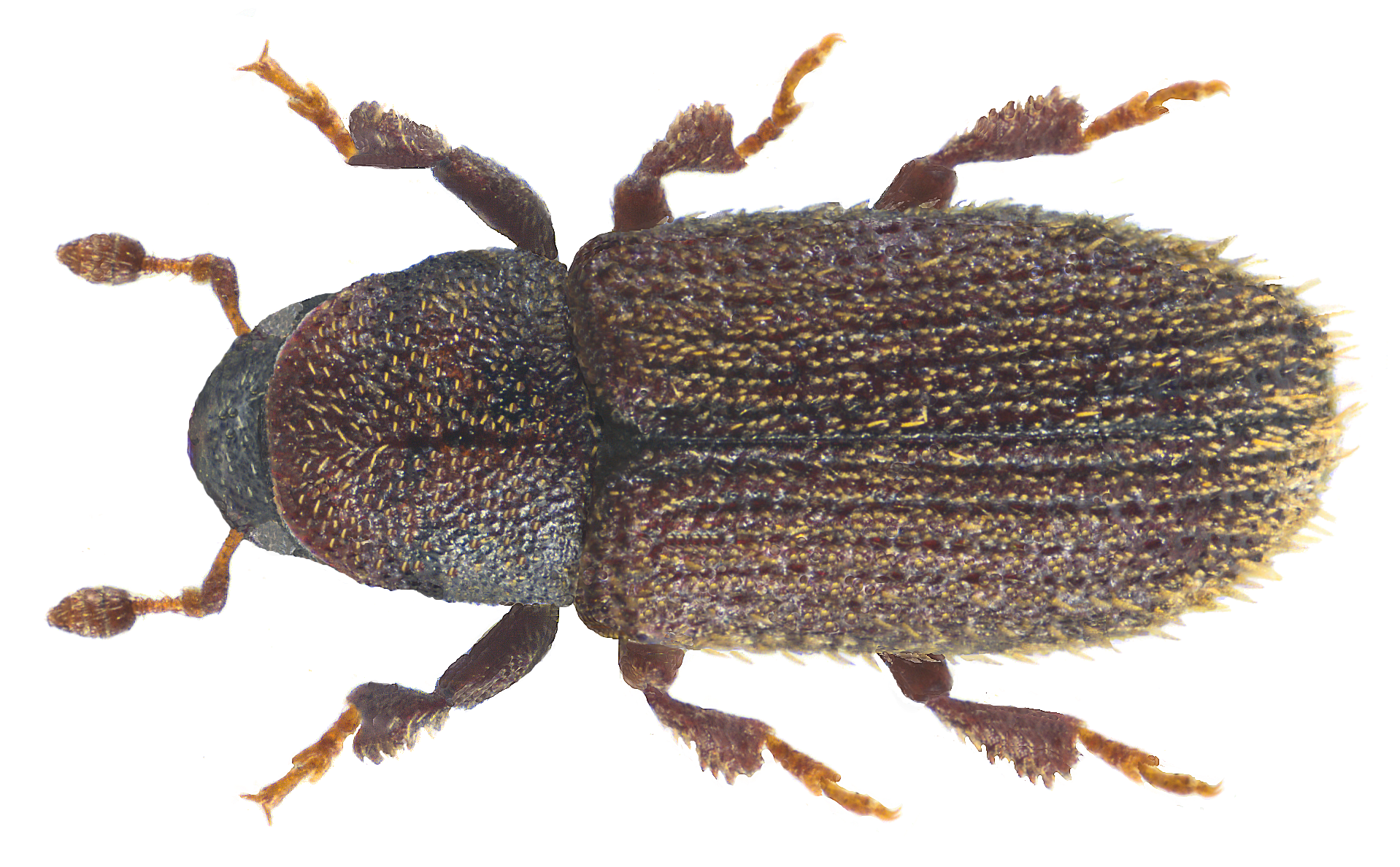
- Xylechinus pilosus

Scientific classification
- Domain: Eukaryota
- Kingdom: Animalia
- Phylum: Arthropoda
- Class: Insecta
- Order: Coleoptera
- Suborder: Polyphaga
- Infraorder: Cucujiformia
- Family: Curculionidae
- Tribe: Hylesinini
- Genus: Xylechinus; Chapuis, 1869

= Xylechinus =

Genus of beetles

Xylechinus is a genus of crenulate bark beetles in the family Curculionidae whose 53 described species include:

- Xylechinus acaciae Schedl
- Xylechinus aconcaguensis Wood, 2007
- Xylechinus africanus Browne, 1973a
- Xylechinus americanus Blackman, 1922
- Xylechinus araucariae Mecke, 2004
- Xylechinus arisanus Eggers, 1939c
- Xylechinus australis Schedl, 1957d
- Xylechinus avarus Wood, 1969b
- Xylechinus bergeri Spessivtsev & P., 1919
- Xylechinus calvus Schedl
- Xylechinus capensis Wood & Bright, 1992
- Xylechinus chiliensis Wood, 1980c
- Xylechinus darjeelingensis Schedl, 1971c
- Xylechinus declivis Wood, 2007
- Xylechinus formosanus Schedl
- Xylechinus freiburgi Schedl
- Xylechinus fuliginosus Blandford, 1897a
- Xylechinus gummensis Wood, 1986a
- Xylechinus huapiae Wood, 2007
- Xylechinus imperialis Wood & Bright, 1992
- Xylechinus irrasus Blandford, 1897a
- Xylechinus leai Schedl
- Xylechinus maculatus Schedl, 1951d
- Xylechinus marmoratus Blandford, 1897a
- Xylechinus mexicanus Wood, 1974a
- Xylechinus minor Eggers, 1928c
- Xylechinus montanus Blackman, 1940
- Xylechinus mozolevskae Petrov & Perkovsky, 2008
- Xylechinus nahueliae Wood, 2007
- Xylechinus nigrosetosus Hagedorn, 1909a
- Xylechinus obscurus Eggers, 1941b
- Xylechinus ougeniae Wood, 1988a
- Xylechinus padus Wood, 1988a
- Xylechinus papuanus Schedl, 1970a
- Xylechinus pilosus Chapuis, 1869
- Xylechinus planicolle Wood & Bright, 1992
- Xylechinus porteri Brèthes, 1925
- Xylechinus pudus Wood
- Xylechinus roeri Schedl, 1977c
- Xylechinus scabiosus Blandford, 1897a
- Xylechinus solervicensi Wood, 2007
- Xylechinus spathifer Schedl
- Xylechinus squamatilis Wood, 2007
- Xylechinus squamiger Schedl
- Xylechinus squamosus Wood & Bright, 1992
- Xylechinus sulcatus Schedl
- Xylechinus taunayi Eggers, 1928c
- Xylechinus tessellatus Blandford, 1897a
- Xylechinus tuberculifer Wood, 2007
- Xylechinus uniformis Schedl, 1982
- Xylechinus valdivianus Eggers, 1942a
- Xylechinus variegatus Wood & Bright, 1992
- Xylechinus vittatus Schedl
