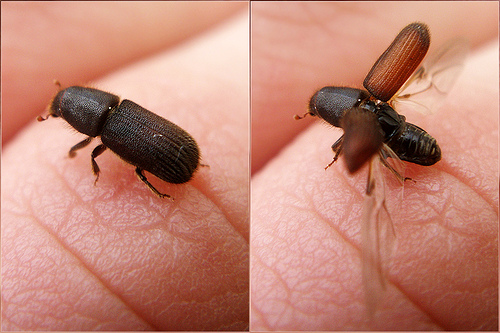
- Hylurgus ligniperda

Scientific classification
- Kingdom: Animalia
- Phylum: Arthropoda
- Class: Insecta
- Order: Coleoptera
- Suborder: Polyphaga
- Infraorder: Cucujiformia
- Family: Curculionidae
- Genus: Hylurgus; Latreille, 1807

= Hylurgus =

Genus of beetles

Hylurgus is a genus of beetles belonging to the family Curculionidae.

Species:

- Hylurgus abietiperda Dejean, 1821
- Hylurgus affinis Dejean, 1821
