= Pseudohylesinus =

Scientific classification
- Domain: Eukaryota
- Kingdom: Animalia
- Phylum: Arthropoda
- Class: Insecta
- Order: Coleoptera
- Suborder: Polyphaga
- Infraorder: Cucujiformia
- Family: Curculionidae
- Subfamily: Scolytinae
- Genus: Pseudohylesinus; Swaine, 1917

Genus of beetles

Pseudohylesinus is a genus of crenulate bark beetles in the family Curculionidae. There are at least 20 described species in Pseudohylesinus.

== Species ==
These 22 species belong to the genus Pseudohylesinus:

- Pseudohylesinus brasiliensis Schedl, 1951m
- Pseudohylesinus dispar Blackman, 1942
- Pseudohylesinus furnissi Blackman, 1942b
- Pseudohylesinus grandis Swaine, J.M., 1917 (silver fir beetle)
- Pseudohylesinus granulatus Swaine, J.M., 1918a (fir root bark beetle)
- Pseudohylesinus griseus Chamberlin (Swaine, J.M. in), 1917
- Pseudohylesinus keeni Blackman, 1942b
- Pseudohylesinus maculosus Blackman, 1942
- Pseudohylesinus magnus Wood, 1956c
- Pseudohylesinus mexicanus Blackman, 1942b
- Pseudohylesinus nebulosus (LeConte, 1859) (douglas-fir pole beetle)
- Pseudohylesinus nobilis Swaine, 1917
- Pseudohylesinus obesus Swaine, J.M., 1917
- Pseudohylesinus pini Wood, 1969
- Pseudohylesinus pullatus Blackman, 1942b
- Pseudohylesinus sericeus (Mannerheim, 1843) (silver fir beetle)
- Pseudohylesinus serratus Bruck, 1936b
- Pseudohylesinus similis Blackman, 1942b
- Pseudohylesinus sitchensis Swaine, 1917
- Pseudohylesinus tsugae Swaine, 1917
- Pseudohylesinus variegatus Wood & Bright, 1992
- Pseudohylesinus yasamatsui Nobuchi, 1971b
