= Chramesus =

Scientific classification
- Domain: Eukaryota
- Kingdom: Animalia
- Phylum: Arthropoda
- Class: Insecta
- Order: Coleoptera
- Suborder: Polyphaga
- Infraorder: Cucujiformia
- Family: Curculionidae
- Subfamily: Scolytinae
- Genus: Chramesus; LeConte, 1868

Genus of beetles

Chramesus is a genus of crenulate bark beetles in the family Curculionidae. There are at least 100 described species in Chramesus.

== See also ==
- List of Chramesus species
