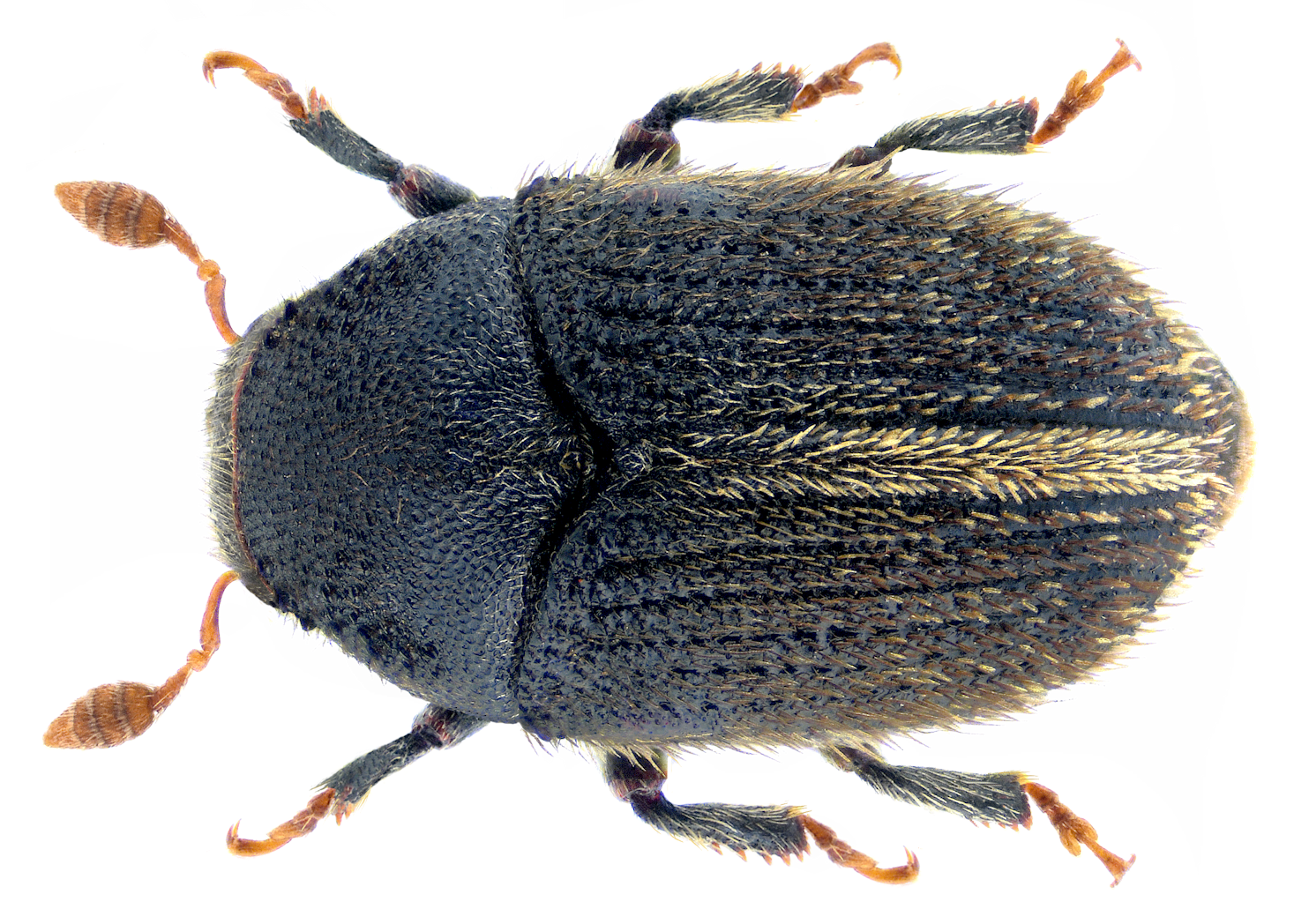
- Hylesinus oleiperda

Scientific classification
- Domain: Eukaryota
- Kingdom: Animalia
- Phylum: Arthropoda
- Class: Insecta
- Order: Coleoptera
- Suborder: Polyphaga
- Infraorder: Cucujiformia
- Family: Curculionidae
- Tribe: Hylesinini
- Genus: Hylesinus; Fabricius, 1801

= Hylesinus =

Genus of beetles

Hylesinus is a genus of crenulate bark beetles in the family Curculionidae. There are more than 180 described species in Hylesinus.

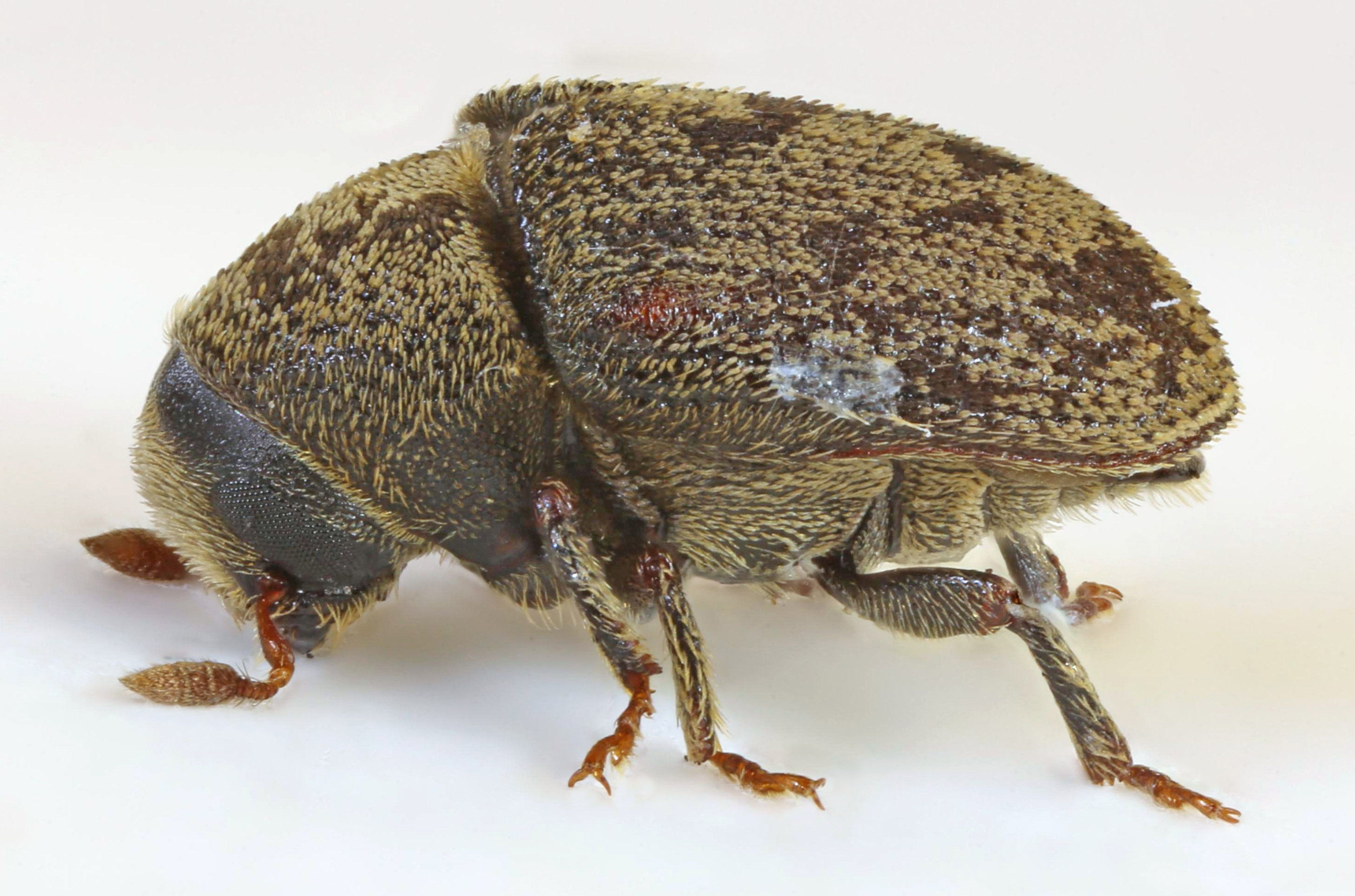
Hylesinus varius

== See also ==
- List of Hylesinus species
