= Ulmus minor 'Christine Buisman' =

Cultivar, resistant to Dutch elm disease

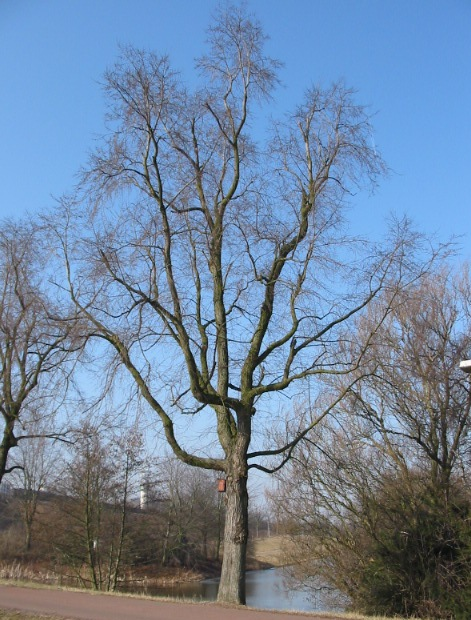
- 'Christine Buisman' Amsteldijk, Amsterdam.
- Species: Ulmus minor
- Cultivar: 'Christine Buisman'
- Origin: Netherlands

The Field Elm cultivar Ulmus minor 'Christine Buisman' was the first cultivar released by the Dutch elm breeding programme, initiated in response to the less virulent form of Dutch elm disease (DED), Ophiostoma ulmi, which afflicted Europe's elms after the First World War. 'Christine Buisman' was selected from a batch of 390 seedlings grown from seed collected in the Parque de la Quinta de la Fuente del Berro, Madrid, by Mrs Van Eeghen, a friend of elm researcher Johanna Westerdijk, in 1929 and named for the elm disease researcher Christine Buisman. Originally identified as Ulmus foliacea (syn. U. minor), it was later treated as Ulmus × hollandica by Melville. However, more recent research in Belgium using DNA markers has reaffirmed 'Christine Buisman' as a clone of U. minor.

Originally identified as clone No. '24', it showed no symptoms of DED after several artificial inoculations. In later years, minor symptoms were detected on both the motherplant and grafted descendants, but these were considered too insignificant to delay its release to commerce as Ulmus 'Christine Buisman' in 1937.

== Description ==
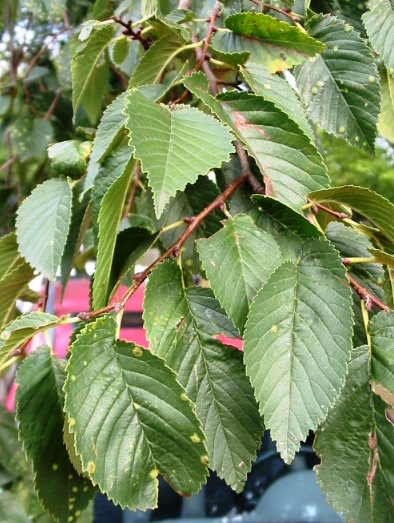

The tree was deemed to have 'no outstanding ornamental characteristics', being 'broadly pyramidal, but 'irregular' in shape, notably the habit of one or two of the main branches initially growing out almost horizontally for about 1 m before curving upwards to the vertical, while outer branches can be long and pendulous. Other authorities have been more generous, noting its straight trunk and relatively short and slender branches forming a small crown. The twigs are dark brown, strigose pubescent at first, becoming smooth. The alternate buds are ovoid, covered with a grey pubescence. The leaves are 7.0 cm long by 4.5 cm wide, very oblique at the base, with doubly serrate margins, smooth and dark green above, lighter below, and with prominent parallel veins covered with coarse white hair. The petiole is 10 millimetres (0.39 in) long.

== Pests and diseases ==
'Christine Buisman' was found to be highly resistant to the first strain of DED, O. ulmi, but prone to some strains of Coral Spot fungus Nectria cinnabarina as it lacked resistance mechanisms. In the US, the clone also proved highly resistant to elm yellows, but very susceptible to Japanese beetles.

== Cultivation ==
The tree had not been thoroughly evaluated in the field before its release. However, such was the clamour for a resistant tree in the Netherlands, nurseries there raised and released large numbers, selling almost 10,000 per annum by the late 1930s. Once its shortcomings, which included poor resistance to sea winds, became apparent, commercial production soon ceased, although by this time it had already been exported to Italy and the United States where it was planted as a street tree. The tree can still be found in the Netherlands, notably in The Hague, Amsterdam, Wassenaar, and Heiloo. Two specimens were planted 2019 in Overmeerseweg, Nederhorst den Berg, as part of Wijdemeren City Council's elm collection. In the UK it is largely restricted to Brighton. In North America, the tree has proved notably tolerant of heat, drought, and cold. In 1972, 1,000 trees were planted in Kansas City. USDA Hardiness Zone 4 (−20 to −10 °F (−29 to −23 °C)).

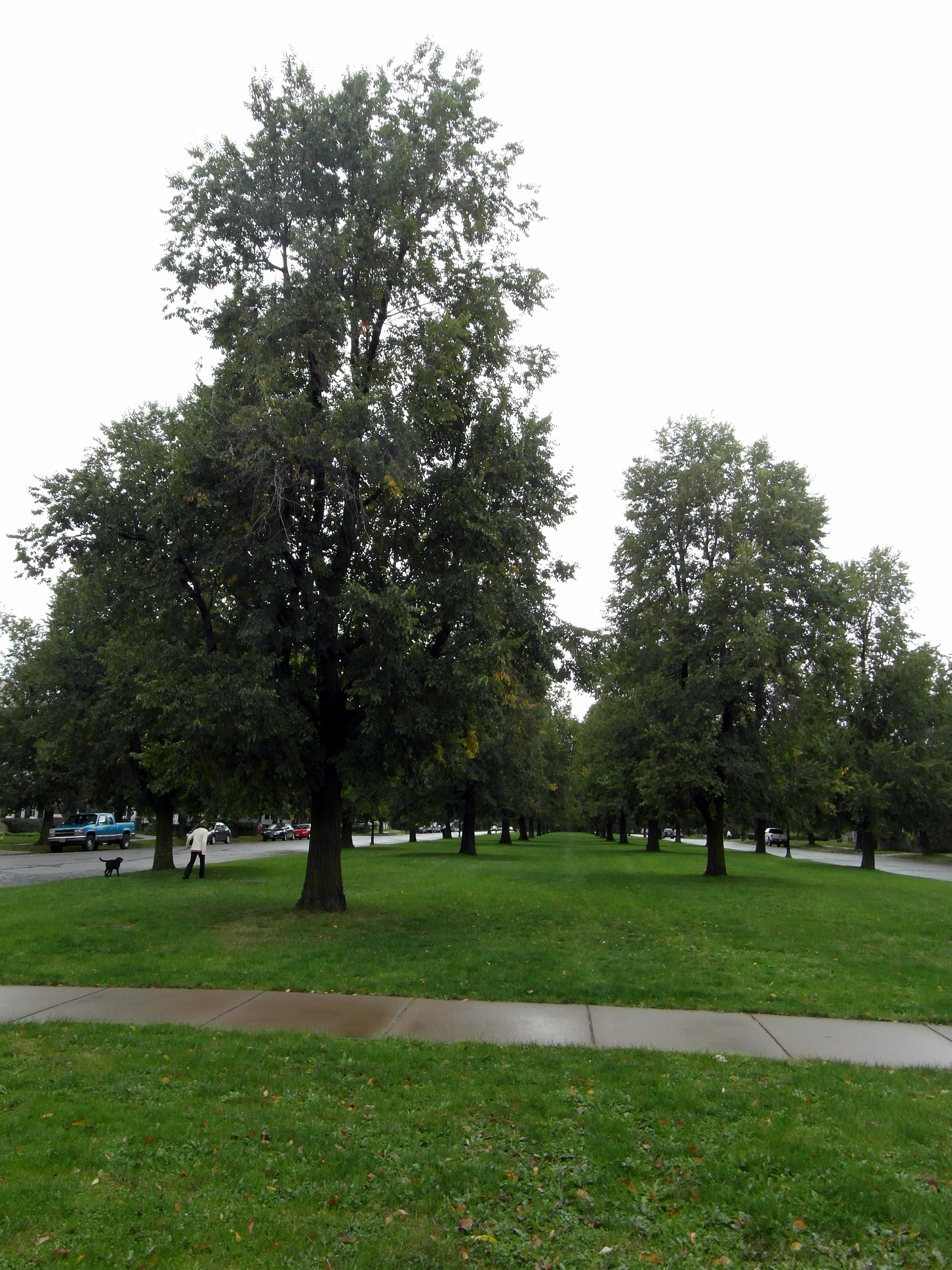
'Christine Buisman', Chapin Parkway, Buffalo, New York (2012)

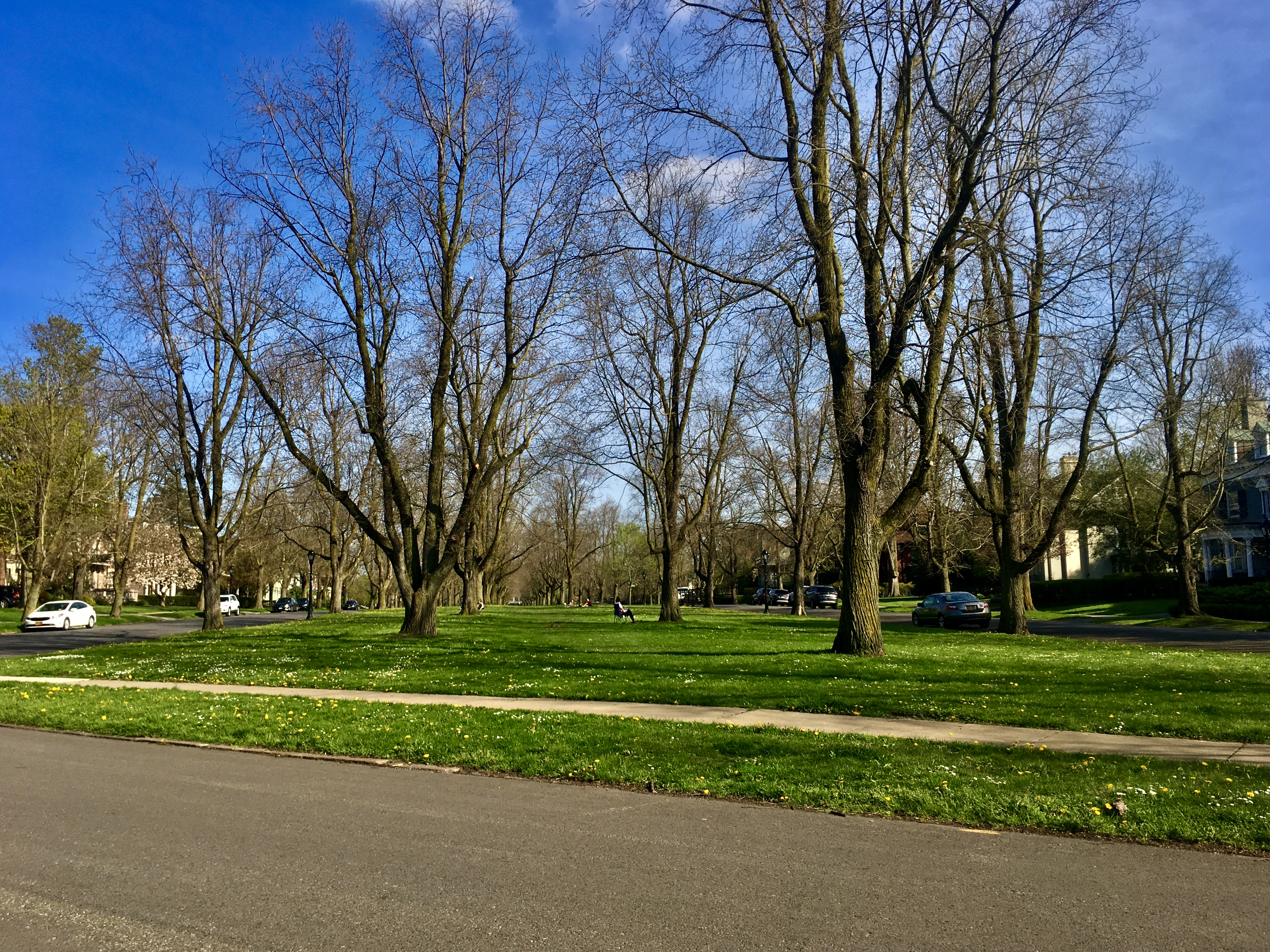
'Christine Buisman', Chapin Parkway, Buffalo, New York (May, 2020)

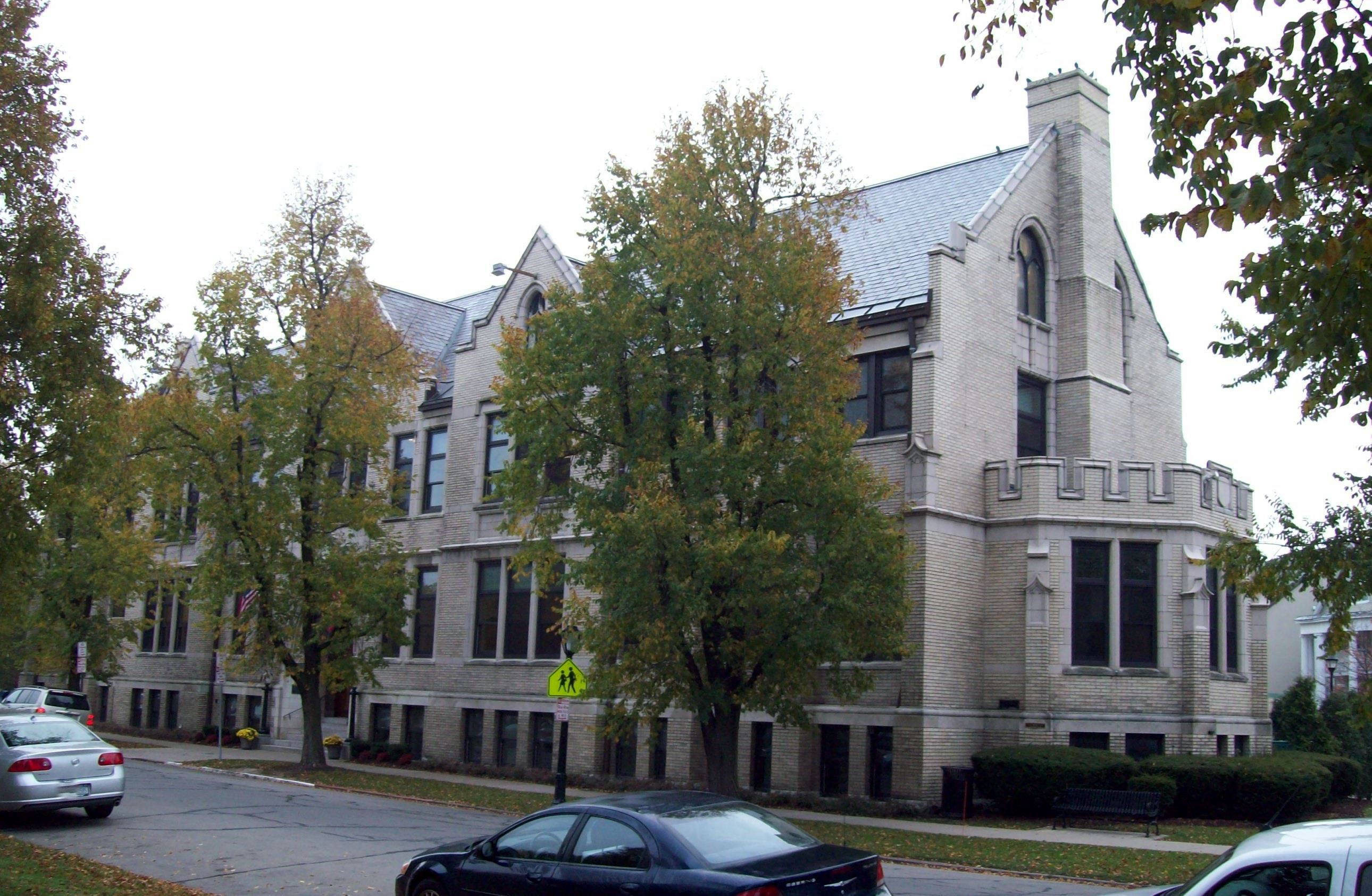
'Christine Buisman', Bidwell Parkway, Buffalo, New York (September, 2011)

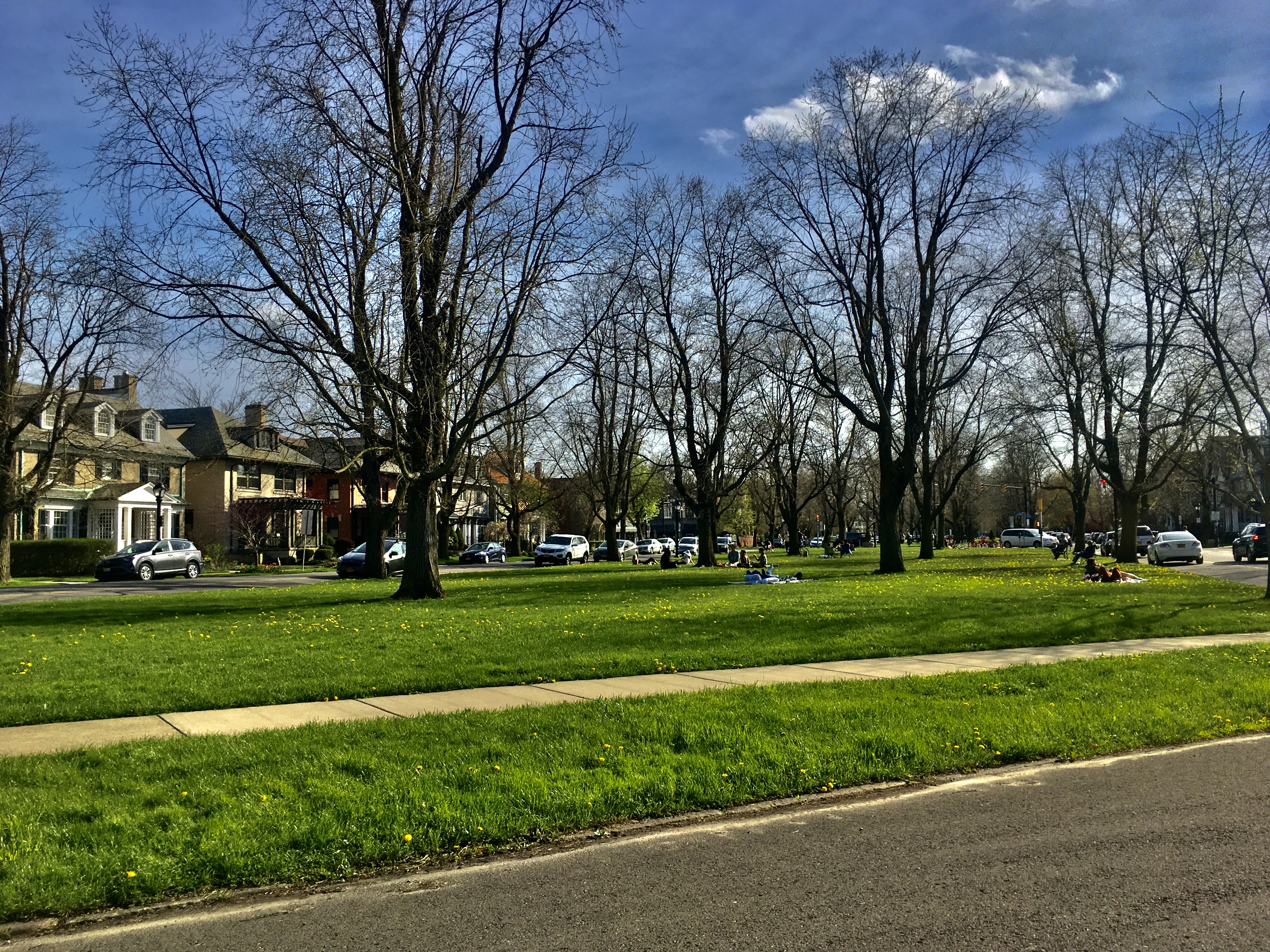
'Christine Buisman', Bidwell Parkway, Buffalo, New York (May, 2020)

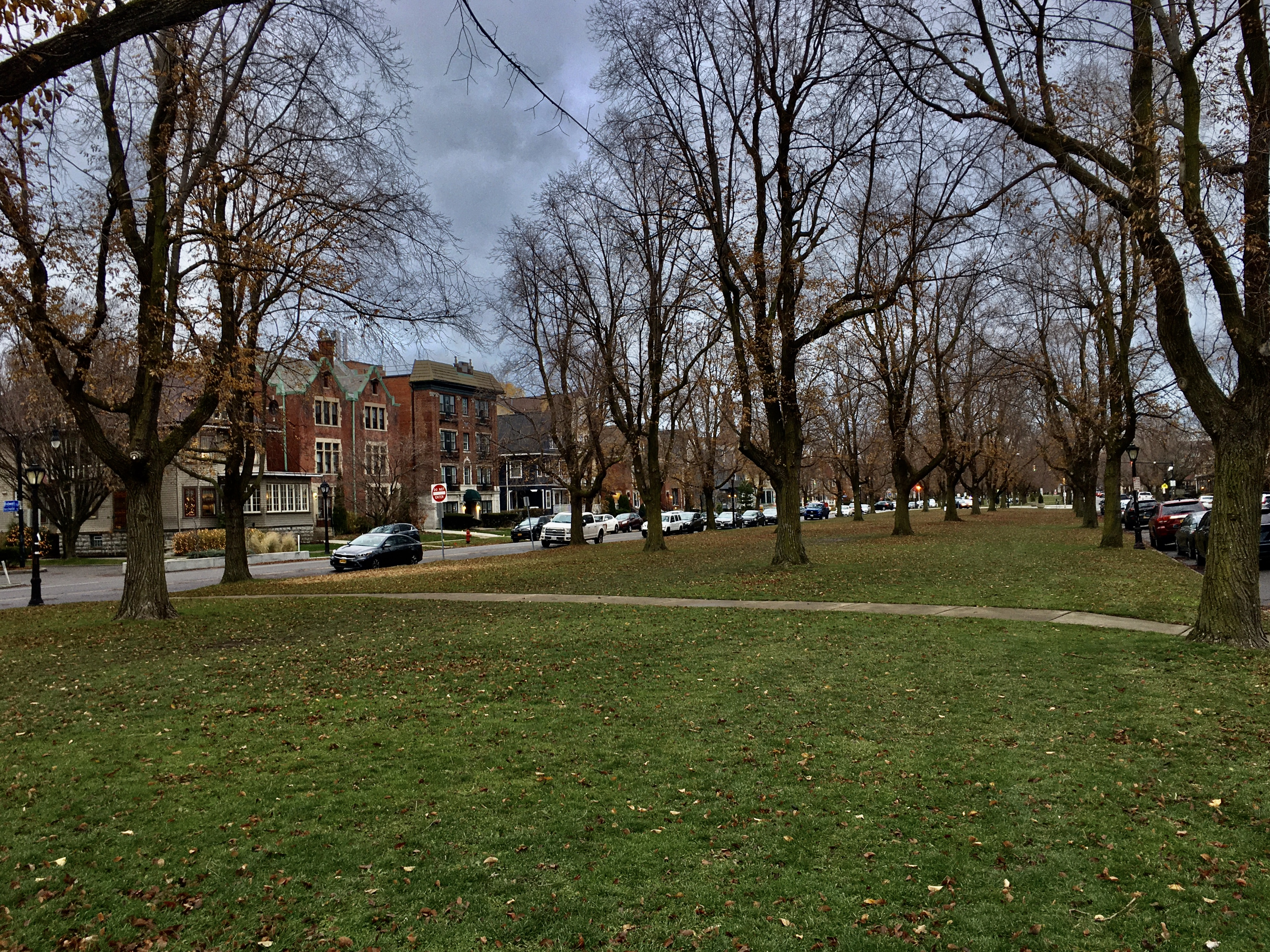
'Christine Buisman', Bidwell Parkway, Buffalo, New York (December, 2020)

=== USDA trials ===
'Christine Buisman' was extensively trialled during the 1950s in the northern central states of the US by the USDA's Agricultural Research Service. The tree performed very well, and such losses that were sustained were attributable to climatic extremes, not disease.

== Notable trees ==
A large specimen planted in 1957 by Bernice Cronkhite in memory of Christine Buisman survives (2010) outside the Cronkhite Graduate Center, Harvard University, US. A particularly impressive plantation exists in the US at Buffalo, along McKinley, Chapin, Bidwell, and Lincoln Parkways, as well as Richmond Avenue and in Forest Lawn Cemetery. In the UK, the TROBI Champion is found on Palmeira Avenue, Hove, 12 metres (39 ft) high by 38 centimetres (15 in) d.b.h. in 2009.

== Cultivars ==
- U. '297'. A Dutch self-pollinated tree; a specimen planted at Preston Park, Brighton, in 1964 was 19 metres (62 ft) high, 43 centimetres (17 in) d.b.h. in 2001.

== Etymology ==
The tree is named for Christine Buisman, the first full-time elm researcher (1927-1936) in the Netherlands, who provided the final proof that Graphium ulmi Schwarz (now: Ophiostoma ulmi (Buisman) Melin & Nannf.) was the causal agent of Dutch elm disease. Buisman died in 1936, aged 36.

== Synonymy ==
- Ulmus 'Buisman': Plant Buyer's Guide, ed. 6. 285, 1958, without description.
- Ulmus × hollandica 'Christine Buisman': Melville, and various arboreta listings in US and Europe.
- Ulmus procera 'Christine Buisman': Morton Arboretum Catalogue 2006.

== Accessions ==
North America

- Arnold Arboretum, US. Acc. nos. 135-54, 273-46
- Bartlett Tree Experts, US. Acc. no. 1371
- Dawes Arboretum, Newark, Ohio, US. 2 trees, as U. carpinifolia 'Christine Buisman'. Acc. nos. D1960-0123.023, D1960-0123.001
- Holden Arboretum, US. Acc. nos. 54-271, 55-446
- Longwood Gardens, US. Acc. no. 1967-0875
- Morton Arboretum, US. Acc. no. 30-2007
- United States National Arboretum, Washington, D.C., US. Acc. no. 76239

Europe

- Brighton & Hove City Council, UK. NCCPG Elm Collection. (as Ulmus × hollandica 'Christine Buisman').
- Grange Farm Arboretum, Sutton St. James, Lincs., UK. Acc. no. 1257

== Nurseries ==
=== Europe ===
- Noordplant , Glimmen, Netherlands.
