= Christine Buisman =

Dutch botanist

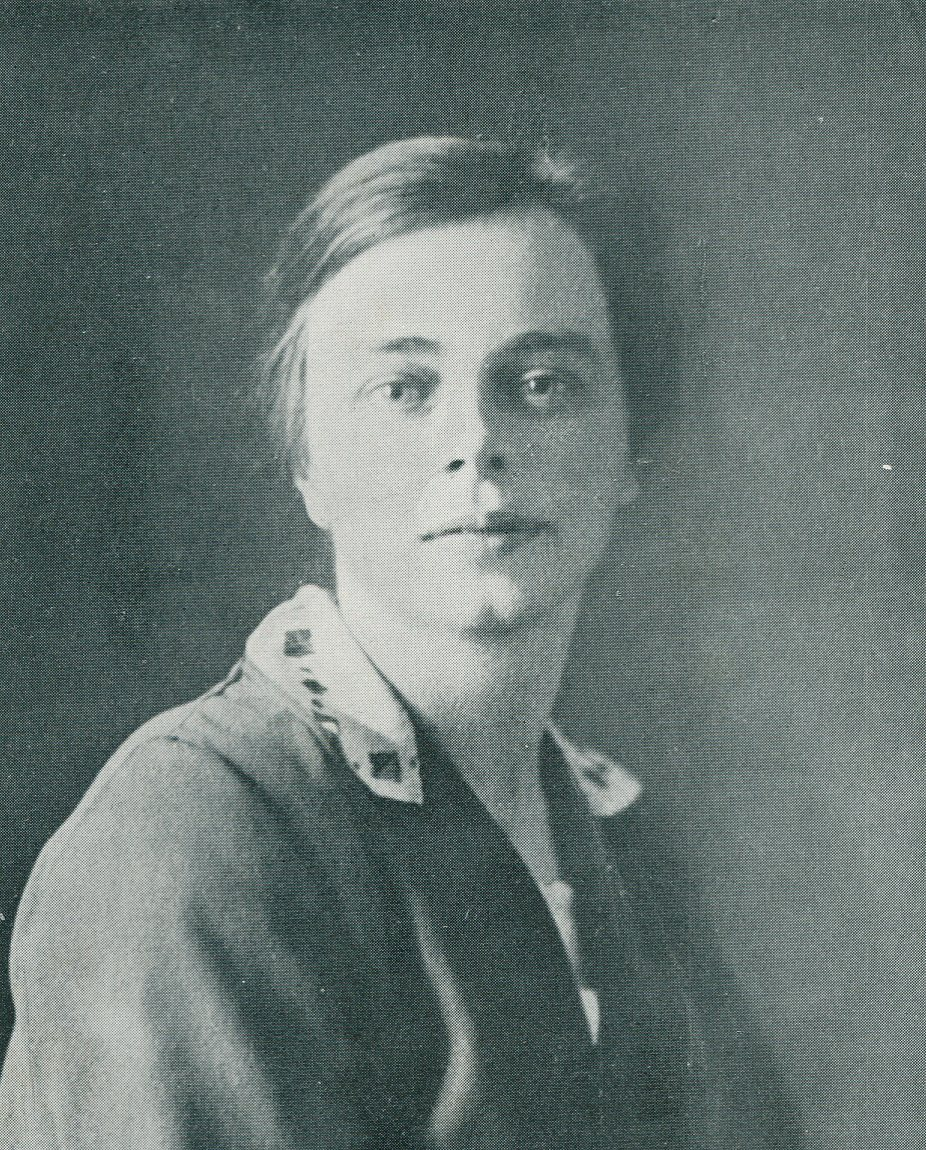
- Born: Christine Johanna Buisman; 22 March 1900; Leeuwarden, Netherlands
- Died: 27 March 1936 (aged 36); Amsterdam, Netherlands
- Resting place: Westerveld Cemetery, Driehuis, Netherlands
- Occupation: Phytopathologist
- Years active: 1926–1936

Christine Johanna Buisman (Dutch pronunciation: [krɪsˈtinə joːˈɦɑnaː ˈbœysmɑn]; 22 March 1900 – 27 March 1936) was a Dutch phytopathologist who dedicated her short career to the research of Dutch elm disease and the selection of resistant elm seedlings. In 1927, Buisman provided the final proof that Graphium ulmi (later named Ophiostoma ulmi) was the causal agent of the disease, concluding the controversy which had raged among Dutch and German scientists since 1922.

Buisman developed the inoculation method for screening large numbers of elm plants for resistance, and in 1932 discovered the generative form of the fungus, Ceratostomella ulmi. The first ever resistant elm clone released in the Netherlands was named for her in 1937, following her untimely death the previous year.

== Biography ==
Buisman was the eldest of four children raised in a liberal and socially conscious family in Leeuwarden. She completed her secondary education at the local gymnasium in 1919, after which she studied Biology in Amsterdam, her main interest at that time being marine flora. During 1923–24, Buisman joined practical courses at the phytopathology laboratory “Willie Commelin Scholten” in Baarn, a small town near Amsterdam. The laboratory was accommodated in the leafy Villa Java alongside the Centraal Bureau voor Schimmelcultures (fungiculture) (CBS), where Buisman also worked as an assistant. Both institutions were led by Prof. Johanna Westerdijk (1883–1961), the first female professor in the Netherlands, appointed in 1917. In 1927, Buisman was awarded a doctorate by Utrecht University for work on root-rotting Phycomycetes (Phytophthora and Pythium).

== Elm disease research ==
At the end of 1926, funds were granted for further research into the cause of Dutch elm disease. Buisman was charged with this two-year project, and part of the villa garden was duly planted with elm seedlings. To infect so many plants, Buisman experimented with the use of a syringe, a method which would be used in successive decades. In 1927, she succeeded in producing both vascular discolouration and leaf wilt, simply by inoculating her trial plants earlier in summer than Bea Schwarz had done in 1921, confirming the results achieved by Wollenweber and Stapp in Berlin, providing the definitive proof that Graphium ulmi caused Dutch elm disease (DED).

In 1929, Buisman left the CBS for further study in Dahlem Berlin. In August that year, she attended a congress of the International Federation of University Women in Geneva, where she met Bernice Cronkhite, dean of Harvard University’s Radcliffe College in Boston, US. Buisman seized the opportunity to apply for a fellowship to study the elms and elm diseases in the US, and by the next month she began her one year’s study in Boston, with the main objective of determining whether Graphium ulmi was also present in the US. It was not until the last days before her return to Europe that she managed to isolate the fungus in samples from Cleveland, being the first to confirm the presence of the fungus on the North American continent. She also studied other elm diseases, helped by donations of Ulmus americana seedlings from the U.S. Department of Agriculture. She recorded this research in a paper published in the Journal of the Arnold Arboretum, Vol. XII (1931): "Three Species of Botryodiplodia Sacc. on Elm Trees in the United States".

== Dutch Elm Committee ==
During Buisman's stay in the US, the threat posed by DED in the Netherlands was taken more seriously and, in February 1930, a second attempt led to the founding of the Committee for Study and Control of the Elm Disease. Westerdijk invited Buisman to accept the position of researcher at Baarn on her return in October 1930. During her years at Baarn, Buisman wrote many publications on elm disease, delivering speeches in and beyond the Netherlands (she was multilingual), quickly establishing herself as the paramount elm specialist in Europe.

From the thousands of seedlings under test, by 1935 Buisman had selected several promising elm clones with a significantly better resistance to DED, notably two from France (clone no. 1) and Spain (clone no. 24), which she prepared to use in hybridization experiments in The Hague, assisted by Simon Doorenbos, director of that city's parks department.

== Death ==
In March 1936, Buisman underwent a gynaecological operation. Although the surgery initially appeared successful, she succumbed to an infection on March 27, just five days after her 36th birthday. Buisman was buried three days later at the hilltop cemetery 'Westerveld' at Driehuis, set in the dunes of the North Sea west of Amsterdam.

== Eponymy ==
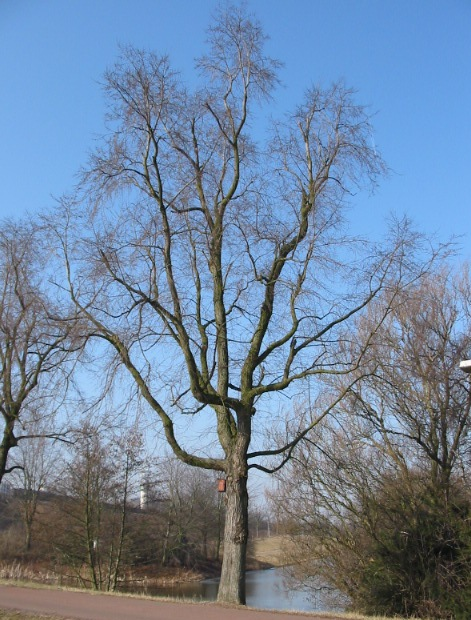
Ulmus minor 'Christine Buisman' in Amsterdam, 2007

When the Dutch Elm Committee decided to release clone No. 24 in 1937, the clone was named for the dedicated elm researcher. Although the 'Christine Buisman' elm didn't meet expectations concerning its growth habit, and appeared to be susceptible to Coral Spot fungus, Nectria cinnabarina, many mature specimens still survive in the Netherlands, England and the US as living proof of her achievement.

== Epilogue ==
The Dutch resistant-elm breeding project continued until 1992, followed in due course by similar projects in North America, Italy, and Spain, releasing to commerce many more DED-resistant elm cultivars.

=== Christine Buisman Foundation ===
Soon after her death, Buisman's parents inaugurated the Christine Buisman Foundation, which contributes to the expenses for foreign studies by female Dutch biology students.
