= Cronkhite =

Cronkhite (from Dutch krankheid: "illness", "disease") is an Americanized Dutch surname.

Notable individuals with the surname:

== People ==
- Adelbert Cronkhite (1861–1937), United States Army general
- Bernice Cronkhite (1893–1983), American academic
- Kendal Cronkhite, American production designer

== See also ==
- Cronkite, a surname
- Fort Cronkhite, former US Army post in California named for Major General Adelbert Cronkhite
