= Maria Löhnis =

Dutch biologist (1888-1964)

- Born: 21 January 1888; Frederiksoord, Drenthe, Netherlands
- Died: 14 April 1964 (aged 76); Wageningen, Netherlands
- Scientific career
- Fields: Plant pathology, Microbiology
- Thesis: Onderzoek over Phytophthora infestans (Mont.) de Bary op de aardappelplant (Study of Phytophthora infestans (Mont.) de Bary on potato plants) (1922)
- Academic advisors: Johanna Westerdijk

Maria Petronella Löhnis (21 January 1888 - 14 April 1964) was a Dutch phytopathologist, microbiologist and botanist noted for studying potato diseases.

== Biography ==
Maria (Rie) Löhnis was the daughter of Frederik Bernard Löhnis, an Inspector of Secondary Education, and Laurensina Johanna 's Jacob.

Löhnis started working with Johanna Westerdijk at the Willie Commelin Scholten Phytopathological Laboratory in Amsterdam in 1913, and moved with the laboratory to Villa Java in Baarn in 1920. Along with Marie Beatrice Schwarz, Löhnis was one of Westerdijk's first students. Her doctoral work at the University of Utrecht concerned the influence of weather on potato blight, caused by the oomycete pathogen Phytophthora infestans, and was funded by the Research and Advisory Committee for Public Welfare and National Defence. This work resulted in her PhD thesis, entitled Investigation into Phytophthora infestans infection on potato plants (Dutch: Onderzoek over Phytophthora infestans (Mont.) de Bary op de aardappelplant). Löhnis received her PhD in 1922. This work also resulted in the publication of Investigation on the relation between the weather conditions and the occurrence of Potato Blight (Phytophthora infestans) in 1924.

Between 1930 and 1944, Löhnis carried out investigations into the symbiotic relationship between plants and nitrogen fixing Rhizobium bacteria. This work was started in Madison, USA, and finished in the laboratory of Albert Kluyver in Delft. Löhnis found that Rhizobia bacteria are unable to fix nitrogen in pure culture. During the Second World War, Löhnis worked in Wagenigen and published two books - Plant Nutrition (Dutch: Plantenvoeding) in 1946, and Role of Microorganisms in Daily Life (Dutch: Rol der Micro-organismen in het dagelijks leven) in 1948. Löhnis was also an editor for the journal, 'Antonie van Leeuwenhoek, Journal of Microbiology and Serology'.

In 1963, Löhnis published a biography of Johanna Westerdijk.
