= Johanna Westerdijk =

Dutch plant pathologist (1883–1961)

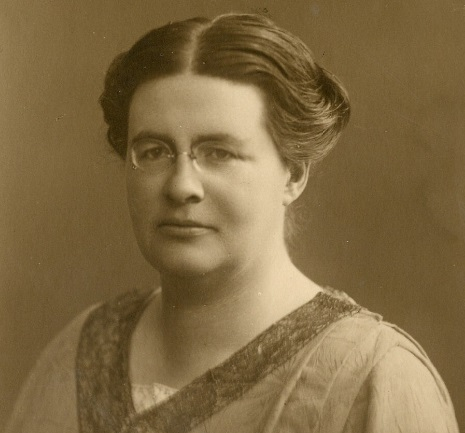
- Born: 4 January 1883; Nieuwer-Amstel, Netherlands
- Died: 15 November 1961 (aged 78); Baarn, Netherlands
- Education: University of Amsterdam; Ludwig-Maximilians-Universität München; University of Zurich (PhD)
- Scientific career
- Fields: Plant pathology
- Workplaces: Utrecht University; University of Amsterdam
- Thesis: Die Regeneration der Laubmoose (The regeneration of mosses) (1906)
- Doctoral advisor: Hans Schinz
- Doctoral students: Marie Beatrice Schol-Schwarz; Maria Löhnis; Johan Gerard ten Houten
- Author abbrev. (botany): Westerd.

Johanna Westerdijk (Dutch pronunciation: [joːˈɦɑnaː ˈʋɛstərˌdɛik]; 4 January 1883 – 15 November 1961) was a Dutch plant pathologist and the first female professor in the Netherlands.

== Early life ==
Johanna Westerdijk, called "Hans" (Dutch pronunciation: [ɦɑns]) by friends, was born on 4 January 1883 in Nieuwer-Amstel, a small village south of Amsterdam, and died on 15 November 1961 at 78 years old in Baarn, Netherlands.

Westerdijk came from a wealthy, intellectual, and artistic family of doctors Bernard Westerdijk (1853–1927) and Aleida Catharina Scheffer (1857–1931), the eldest child of three children. During her elementary school years, she always refused to take embroidery classes or play with dolls like most of the girls of her time. Instead, she enjoyed reading stories to other girls at her school. She mentioned to her teacher that she would make sure to earn enough money to have all her cleaning duties done for her.

== Education ==
She completed her secondary school at 17 years old and graduated from the Amsterdam school of girls. She was a gifted pianist and intended to become a professional pianist but a persistent neuritis in one arm made this impossible. Her interest in botany led her to attend the University of Amsterdam to follow the lectures of the famous botanist Hugo de Vries and work in his laboratory.

After finishing her biological studies in 1904 she decided to conduct research with mosses at the Ludwig-Maximilians-Universität München, and a year later she moved to the University of Zurich to study moss regeneration, earning her PhD degree in 1906 under the supervision of Professor H. Schinz.

== Career ==
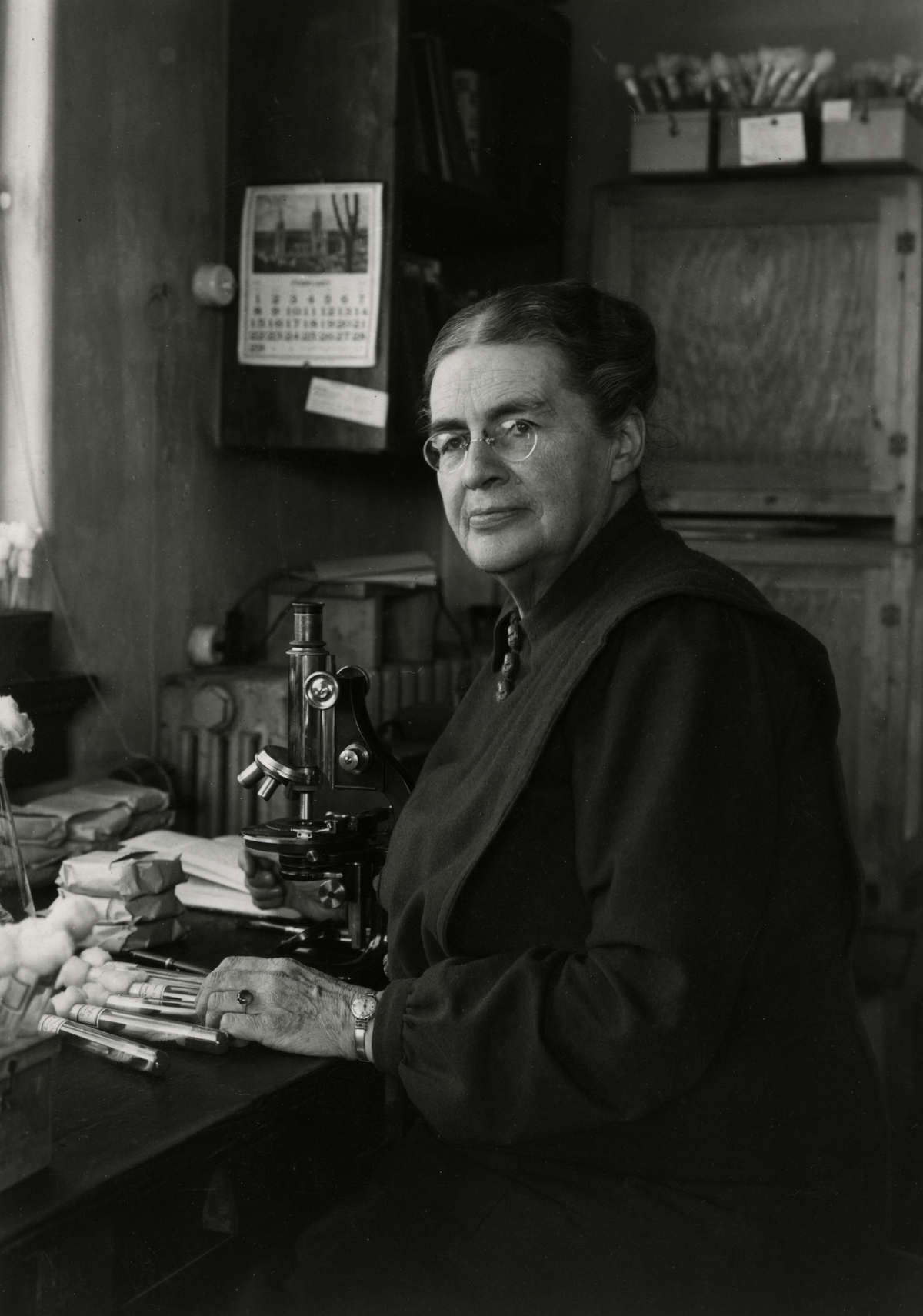
Westerdijk (c.1948)

In 1906, at 23 years old, she was offered a directorship position at Willie Commelin Scholten, a phytopathological laboratory in the Netherlands. The laboratory under her supervision became an internationally respected institution of phytopathology, was moved from Amsterdam to the Villa Java in Baarn and is recognized to the present day with independent status as an institute of the Royal Netherlands Academy of Arts and Sciences.

While working as director of the phytopathological laboratory in 1908 she was in charge of keeping the International Association of Botanists collection of about 80 cultures of fungi. Under her supervision this collection expanded to over 10,000 strains of 6,000 different species of fungi, yeasts and actinomycetes. Named the Centraalbureau voor Schimmelcultures (Central Bureau of Fungal Cultures) the objective of this collection was and still is to keep a variety of fungi in cultures for distribution to research workers all over the world. In 1913, she became the first female recipient of a grant from the Buitenzorg Fund (from the city of Buitenzorg, now called Bogor in Sundanese, in Indonesia), which she used to collect samples from a variety of diseased crops such as tobacco, sugar, coffee, tea, etc., and made cultures of the fungi for the collection.

Across her career she wrote over 60 publications in plant pathology and mycology.

=== Inspiration for women and students ===
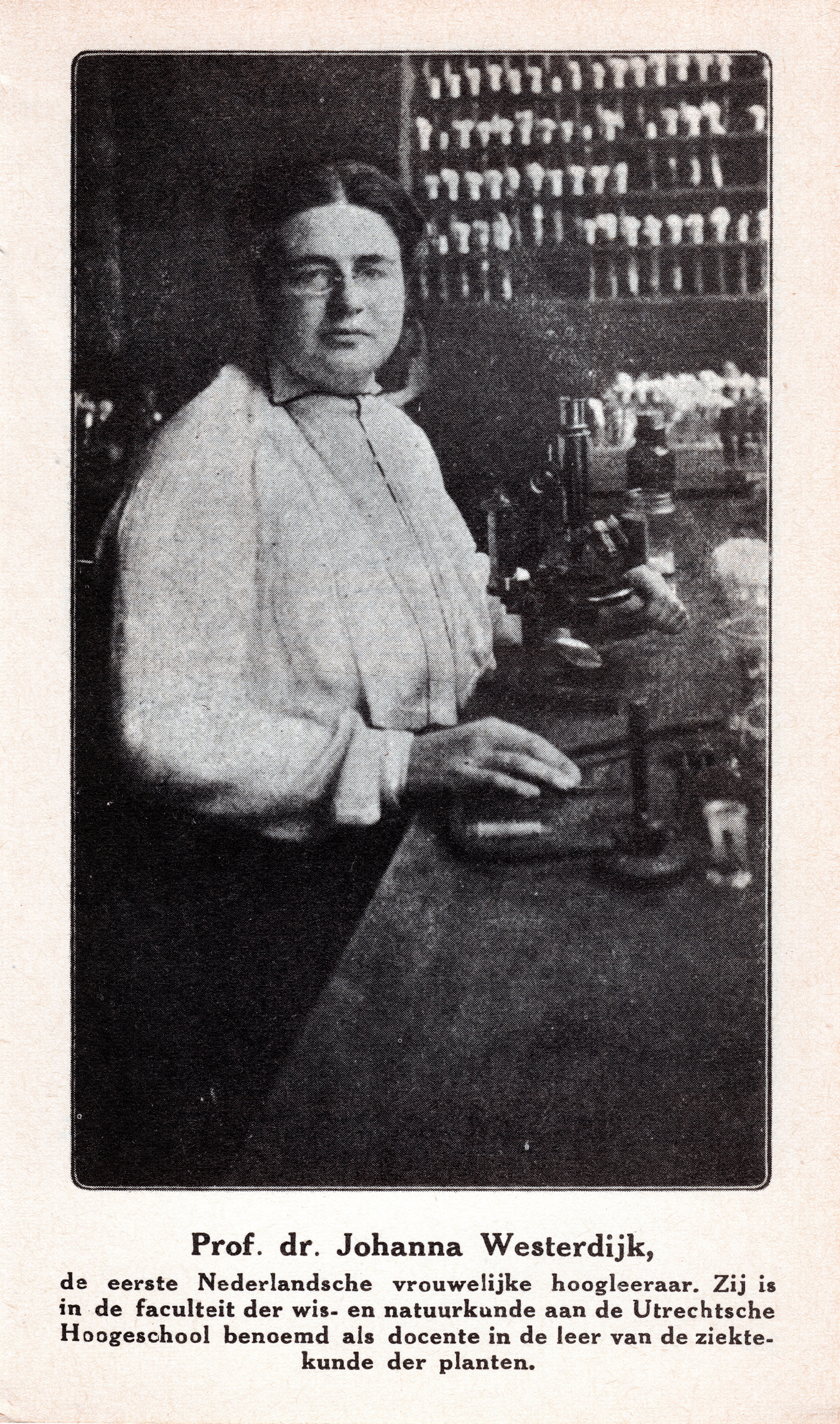
Prof.dr. Johanna Westerdijk

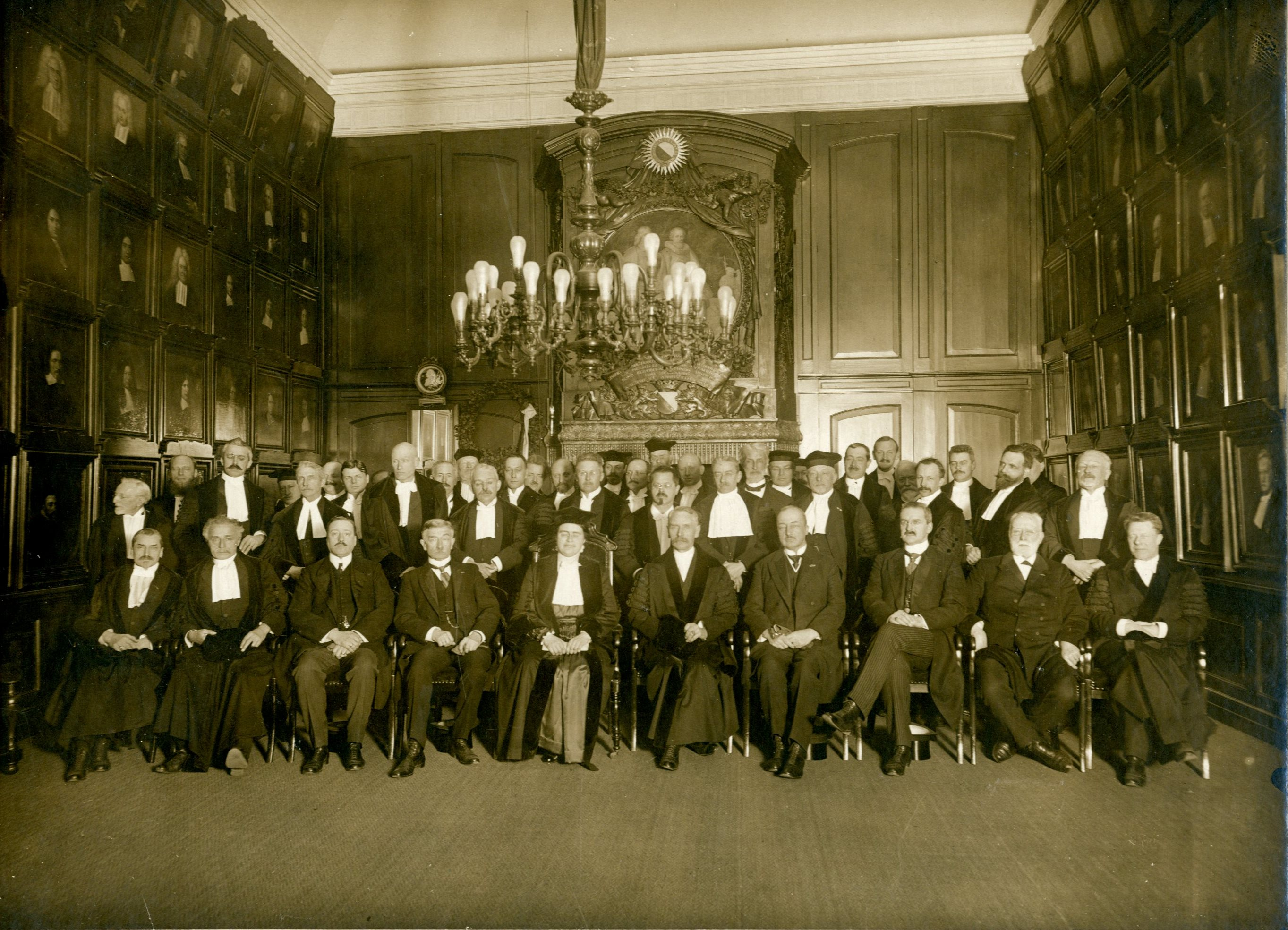
Group portrait with Johanna Westerdijk in the center after her oration as a new professor in 1917

In 1917, she was appointed as the first female professor in the Netherlands, serving as associate professor of plant pathology at Utrecht University and in 1930 at the University of Amsterdam, with a total of 55 PhD students earning their degrees under her supervision in a period of 35 years. Almost half of them were women, being a source of inspiration for students interested in the history of women in science.

She wrote over 70 publications covering a broad spectrum of plant diseases and mycology, but her main interest was in pathogenic diseases of trees and physiological diseases of plants and how to control them. Several of her publications involved trials of chemicals for disease control.

Westerdijk was described by journalists as a young, natural, simple, and strong woman with a pleasant manner and a great sense of humor. She was also known by her close friends as loving to party, drink and dance and without an interest in marriage.

When she wanted to test the progress of her students, she would take them to a fancy bakery surrounded by fashionable ladies and suddenly ask them questions such as "OK, now what can you tell me about yellow disease or any other disease". She also had her own tradition at every new PhD ceremony, where a flag would be raised and three geese wearing white, red and blue bows around their necks would parade around the building. The doctor and his/her professor advisor would plant a tree in the one and a half hectare garden. This tradition became legendary.

All the people who worked on their PhD in Baarn were inspired by the atmosphere and the influence of the laboratory's slogan "For fine minds, the art is to mix work and parties" which Johanna Westerdijk had carved in stone above the entrance to the room for practical work.

Westerdijk was active in the International Federation of University Women, now known as Graduate Women International. She was elected president of the organization in 1932.

== Elm disease research ==
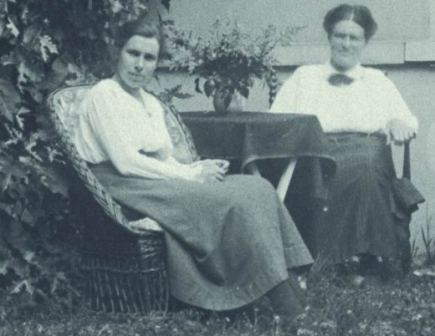
Marie Beatrice Schwarz (left) and Johanna Westerdijk in 1922

In the 1920s, she was involved in understanding a new lethal vascular disease in elms (Dutch elm disease), raising money from different municipalities in the Netherlands, which she assigned to her first PhD student Marie Beatrice Schwarz.

Schwarz isolated and inoculated healthy elms, concluding that a fungus was killing the elms. Later J. Westerdijk assigned another student, Christine Johanna Buisman to confirm the finding from Schwarz that Ophiostoma ulmi was the cause of the disease. Buisman additionally bred elms for disease resistance, but unfortunately the elm that she developed was highly susceptible to another fungal disease caused by a Nectria sp.

== Honors and awards ==
- Member of the Royal Netherlands Academy of Arts and Sciences (1951)
- Fellow of the Linnean Society of London
- Officer of the Order of Orange-Nassau
- Order of the Netherlands Lion
- Knight of the Order of Saint James of the Sword (Portugal)
- Otto Appel Medal (1953) (established for outstanding plant pathologists) at Heidelberg
- Honorary doctorate of the Uppsala University (1957)
- Honorary doctorate of the University of Giessen (1958)

== Eponymous species ==
Several fungus species have been named in honour of Westerdijk, including:

- Aspergillus westerdijkiae Frisvad & Samson (2004)
- Helicodendron westerdijkiae Beverw. (1953)
- Pestalotiopsis westerdykiae Steyaert (1949)
- Gyrothyrium westerdijkiae Arx (1950) (now called Schizothyrium pomi)
- Torulopsis westerdijkiae E.K.Novák & Vitéz (1964)
- Westerdykella centenaria Crous, van Diepeningen & A.-C.Normand (2017)

== Legacy ==
In 1907 Johanna Westerdijk became director of the CBS (Centraalbureau voor Schimmelcultures). In honour of Johanna Westerdijk's life and work, on 10 February 2017 the institute was renamed as the Westerdijk Fungal Biodiversity Institute.
