= Cronkite (surname) =

Cronkite is a surname. Notable people with the surname include:

- James Kipton Cronkite (born 1971), American entrepreneur and philanthropist
- Kathy Cronkite (born 1950), American actress and mental health worker, daughter of Walter
- Walter Cronkite (1916–2009), American broadcast journalist and anchorman

== See also ==
- Cronkhite, a surname of Dutch origin
- 6318 Cronkite, Mars-crossing asteroid
