= Leslie Audus =

British botanist

Leslie John Audus (9 December 1911 – 5 May 2011) was a British botanist and an international authority on the hormones that control plant growth. During World War II, while being held in a Japanese internment camp, he cultured yeast to feed and save the lives of his fellow POW's.

== Early life and education ==
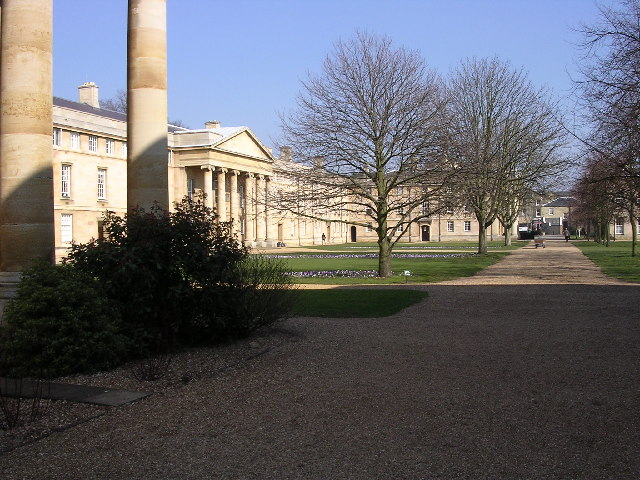
Downing College. The Quad in Downing College, Cambridge looking east towards Regent Street. In the centre of the picture is the portico of the college chapel.

Audus was born in Isleham in The Fens of Cambridgeshire. He was educated at Soham Grammar School and in 1929 was awarded a scholarship to Downing College, Cambridge. In 1934, he was a Frank Smart University student in botany, at Cambridge. After receiving his degree, he stayed in Cambridge to pursue postgraduate work. In 1935, he went to University College, Cardiff, where he continued to research plant physiology and taught plant science.

== World War II ==
Audus joined the Royal Air Force Volunteer Reserve in 1940, after which he received training in radar. In 1941, he was posted to Malaya as a flight lieutenant. While there, he explored the rain forest in Johore with John Corner, the assistant director of the Johore botanical gardens, and later became a distinguished botanist at Cambridge. According to the Telegraph, "Audus made himself popular by bringing with him a turntable, loudspeakers and a collection of records." After the fall of Singapore, he and his unit escaped to Jakarta, where he was captured by the Japanese on 8 March 1942. While being held at the Jaarmarkt prisoner of war camp at Surabaya on Java, he used makeshift equipment and maize grain to produce yeast to supplement the diet of himself and his fellow POWs.

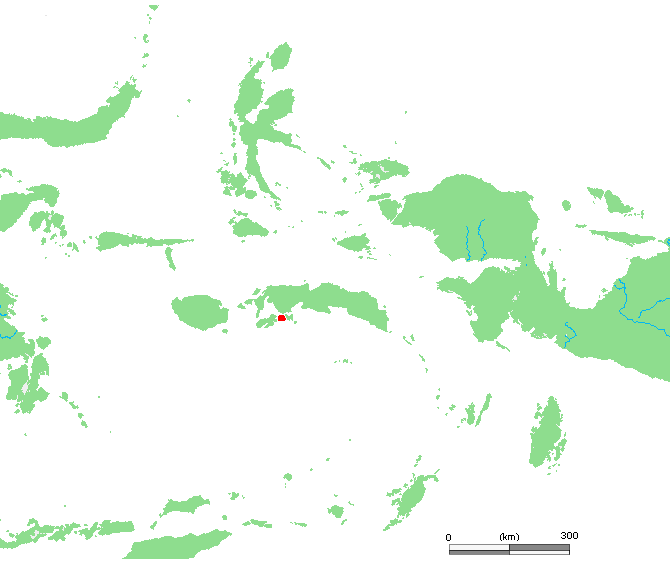
Map of Haruku Island

He was later transferred to a POW camp on Haruku Island, where he and other prisoners were regularly beaten and compelled to perform hard labor. Malnutrition among the POWs was such a serious problem that some of them suffered from impaired vision. Accordingly, senior officers among the POWs asked Audus to produce yeast, as he had at Jaarmarkt, to provide the men with needed vitamins to survive. In a 2008 interview, Audus said that his Japanese captors knew that he was producing vitamin-rich yeast and actually promoted his work, and used it to supplement Japanese soldiers' diets. This time, however, there was no maize grain available. He solved this problem by isolating a mould fungus that not only produced the vitamins but also enabled him to produce an easily digestible protein through the fermentation of soya beans. These dietary supplements, in combination with the construction of a sea latrine that stopped a dysentery outbreak, helped lower POW deaths at the camp from 334 over a five-month period to 52 during the nine months preceding liberation. Audus and his fellow prisoners left the camp on 1 August 1945, and when examined at a hospital afterwards, it turned out that he had sustained irreversible damage to his retinas.

RAF Medical Officer Richard Philps wrote in his 1996 memoir Prisoner Doctor: "The men who survived Haruku and subsequent camps have reason to be extremely grateful to Leslie J Audus... During our first critical time at Haruku, with deaths from beriberi mounting and blindness from Vitamin B deficiency on the increase, he, at first single-handedly, and later with a Dutch botanist, Dr. (now Professor) Johan Gerard ten Houten, devised a method of producing yeast, an abundant source of Vitamin B." Philps noted that Audus was working "against almost impossible odds and with the most primitive equipment," but that his efforts were "so successful that the onset of blindness was halted in those already affected, no new cases occurred, and other changes due to Vitamin B deficiency began to improve – a remarkable feat of biological manipulation."

Fellow Far East Prisoners of War (FEPOW) expressed gratitude to Audus for bringing public attention to their experiences, which are often overlooked in accounts of World War II. First, Audus published a paper entitled "Biology Behind Barbed Wire" in the scientific journal Discovery in 1946, in which he recounted his POW experiences. In 1996, Audus published the book "Spice Island Slaves", a "chronological history" of the experiences of British and Dutch POWs in the Moluccas from 1943 to 1945, "compiled from contemporary diaries and records from a large number of British and Dutch sources, including those of the author". Audus himself translated the Dutch texts into English. Audus was an active member of both the Java FEPOW 1942 Club and the London FEPOW Club, and in 2006 he contributed the foreword to the Java club's book Prisoner in Java, a collection of articles from its quarterly newsletter, The Java Journals.

In the foreword, Audus wrote, in part: "When two atomic bombs rescued the tens of thousands of prisoners from the extermination that would have befallen them had there been any attempt to rescue them by Allied forces, the skeletonlike survivors were soon back in the bosom of their families, finding it impossible to describe the indescribable and unburden themselves of their torturing memories. And so it continued for year after year until chance contacts between erstwhile survivors proved so cathartic that small groups of FEPOWS burgeoned into large associations that were to meet at regular intervals".

== Publications ==
Audus published his first paper entitled "Biology Behind Barbed Wire" in the scientific journal Discovery in 1946, in which he recounted his POW experiences.

His book "Plant Growth Substances", published in 1953 and expanded in 1959 and again in 1972, was for many years the standard text on that topic. His 1964 book, "The Biochemistry and Physiology of Herbicides", was likewise the standard text on that subject.

In 1996, Audus published the book "Spice Island Slaves," a "chronological history" of the experiences of British and Dutch POWs in the Moluccas from 1943 to 1945, "compiled from contemporary diaries and records from a large number of British and Dutch sources, including those of the author." Audus himself translated the Dutch texts into English.

In 2006, he contributed the foreword to the Java club's book Prisoner in Java, a collection of articles from its quarterly newsletter, The Java Journals. In the foreword, Audus wrote, in part: "When two atomic bombs rescued the tens of thousands of prisoners from the extermination that would have befallen them had there been any attempt to rescue them by Allied forces, the skeletonlike survivors were soon back in the bosom of their families, finding it impossible to describe the indescribable and unburden themselves of their torturing memories. And so it continued for year after year until chance contacts between erstwhile survivors proved so cathartic that small groups of FEPOWS burgeoned into large associations that were to meet at regular intervals."

== Organizations ==
Audus was an active member of both the Java FEPOW 1942 Club and the London FEPOW Club. In 1953, he was named a life member of the New York Academy of Sciences. He was vice-president of the Linnean Society of London from 1959 to 1960 and Recorder, 1961–1965, and President, 1967–1968, of Section K of the British Association for the Advancement of Science.

== Postwar career ==
From 1946 to 1947, Audus was a scientific officer with the Agricultural Research Council's Unit of Soil Metabolism at University College, Cardiff. In 1948, he was Monsanto Lecturer in Plant Physiology at the same institution. His work in Cardiff focused particularly on the action of phenoxyacetic acid, a herbicide. In 1948 He was appointed to the Hildred Carlile Chair of Botany at Bedford College, University of London, where he remained until his retirement in 1979.

In 1952, Audus began looking into the action in plant roots of what were then called plant "hormones", and are now known as "growth regulators". This research represented something of a rebirth of the study of the effect of gravity on plants. His book Plant Growth Substances, published in 1953 and expanded in 1959 and again in 1972, was for many years the standard text on that topic. His 1964 book The Biochemistry and Physiology of Herbicides was likewise the standard text on that subject. From 1965 to 1974, Audus served as editor of the Journal of Experimental Botany. His work with plant growth regulators had significant practical consequences in the fields of forestry, agriculture, and horticulture.

Over the years, Audus lectured at over a dozen leading American universities, as well as in the USSR and Poland. In 1958, he was a visiting professor of botany at the University of California, Berkeley, and in 1965 he taught at the University of Minnesota, Minneapolis. In 1953 he was named a life member of the New York Academy of Sciences in 1953. He was vice-president of the Linnean Society of London in 1959–60 and Recorder, 1961–65, and President, 1967–68, of Section K of the British Association for the Advancement of Science.

Audus was described as "a fine teacher" and had an "approachable and kindly" presence at the University of London. "But the strength of character and tenacity that had brought him through the horrors of war meant that he did not flinch from expressing his views forcefully against injustice or political expediency."

== Personal ==
In 1938, Audus married Rowena Mabel Ferguson. They had two daughters. She died in 1987. In addition to his scientific work, he was interested in constructing and restoring furniture, and also built a short-wave radio in order to communicate with colleagues and wartime friends.

== Death ==
Audus died on 5 May 2011. His body was cremated on 26 May 2011 at Basingstoke Crematorium. On 9 June 2012, his ashes were returned to his hometown of Isleham, where they were interred in the Isleham Cemetery. A bench was dedicated to his memory, as was a portion of Priory Wood at Burwell. The inscription on the bench reads: "In Memory of Professor Leslie John Audus 1911-2011. Botanist and Far East Survivor. He loved this village."

After his death a woman named Amanda Johnston wrote that Audus had been "an inspiration to those of us whose fathers were on the terrible Haruku draft and who never spoke of it. His quiet devotion to those who suffered with him was incredible."
