= Johan Gerard ten Houten =

Dutch botanist

- Born: April 17, 1911; Winterswijk, Netherlands
- Died: May 15, 1993 (aged 82); Wageningen, Netherlands
- Other name: Hans ten Houten
- Scientific career
- Fields: Botany, plant pathology
- Workplaces: University of Utrecht, Brocades, NV Javo, Royal Dutch Shell, Instituut voor Plantenziektenkundig Onderzoek (Research Institute for Plant Protection), Wageningen Agricultural University
- Thesis: Kiemplanteziekten van Coniferen (Diseases of Conifer seedlings) (1939)
- Doctoral advisor: Johanna Westerdijk
- Author abbrev. (botany): Houten

J. G. ten Houten (17 April 1911 – 15 May 1993) was a Dutch plant pathologist known for founding and leading several important bodies in that subject in the Netherlands.

== Youth ==
Johan Gerard (Hans) ten Houten was born in Winterswijk in 1911. Normally known as Hans ten Houten.

== Education ==
His father had been interested in biology and J. G. also pursued that interest, joining the Nederlandse Jeugdbond voor Natuurstudie (Netherlands' Young Naturalists League). He went on the study biology at the University of Utrecht, graduating with a degree in plant taxonomy in 1935 with a minor in plant pathology. At the time of his graduation, jobs in biology were scarce and so he took a job at the Dutch pharmaceutical company Brocades. He then began a doctoral program at UU under Johanna Westerdijk, which he completed in 1939 with a dissertation titled Seed Plant Diseases of Conifers.

== Early career ==
After graduation he worked in applied entomology at the Colonial Institute in Amsterdam (now called the Royal Tropical Institute) and then starting at the end of 1939 at the company NV Javo. At NV Javo he was involved mostly with pest and disease control in Roselle grown as a fiber crop on Java, Indonesia. Years later, in 1960, the Tunisian government recognized his contributions to roselle culture by inviting him to provide advice on the experimental introduction of this crop.

== World War II ==
In 1942, during World War II, ten Houten was separated from his family and imprisoned by the Japanese army in the Molucca islands, Indonesia to build airstrips from coral.

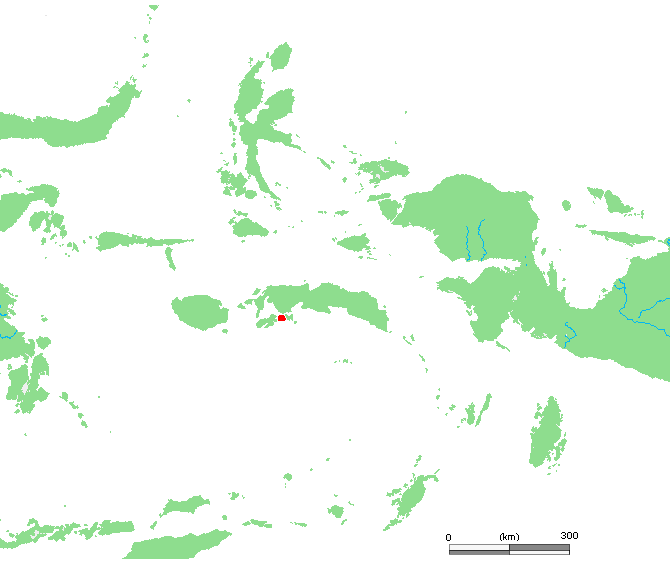
Map of Haruku Island

He was transferred to a POW camp on Haruku Island, where he and other prisoners were regularly beaten and compelled to perform hard labor. Malnutrition among the POWs was such a serious problem that some of them suffered from impaired vision. RAF Medical Officer Richard Philps wrote in his 1996 memoir Prisoner Doctor: "The men who survived Haruku and subsequent camps have reason to be extremely grateful to Leslie Audus.... During our first critical time at Haruku, with deaths from beriberi mounting and blindness from Vitamin B deficiency on the increase, he, at first single-handedly, and later with a Dutch botanist, Dr. (now Professor) JG ten Houten, devised a method of producing yeast, an abundant source of Vitamin B.". Hans considered this effort to be one of the most important contributions he made during his life. Hans and Leslie stayed life long friends.

== After WWII ==
After the Japanese surrender, ten Houten was reunited with his family and returned to the Netherlands. In 1946 he was hired as head of the Biocide Department at Royal Dutch Shell's laboratories in Amsterdam. In 1949, ten Houten became the first director of the newly established In stitute of Phytopathology Research (IPO) in Wageningen. In this position, he manifested remarkable skills in directing the development of crop protection research in The Netherlands. Endowed with a good share of persuasiveness, he managed to obtain the financial means to develop adequate facilities in the institute. From 1951-1957 he was President of the Koninklijke Nederlandse Plantenziektekundige (Royal Netherlands Society of Plant Pathology).

== Instituut voor Plantenziektenkundig Onderzoek ==
Soon thereafter ten Houten created the Instituut voor Plantenziektenkundig Onderzoek (IPO) (Research Institute for Plant Protection) in Wageningen and on September 1, 1949 the board appointed him as its director. There he continued to work until 1974. For the first decade he was also a researcher, especially on Phytophthora, including Phytophthora cactorum. His research also extended to the social and economic benefits of pest control during this time.

In 1971 he was appointed extraordinarius (Extraordinary Professor) of Environmental Science at Wageningen Agricultural University, where he remained until retiring on September 1, 1976. By the end of his life he had received an honorary doctorate from the State Faculty of Agricultural Sciences, Ghent University, Belgium; and was made an Officer of both the Order of Orange-Nassau and of the Order of the Crown of Belgium.

== Personal life ==
Hans married Anneke Pannekoek, a palaeozoologist. Anneke was the daughter of Anton Pannekoek. They had 4 children. During the last years of his life, ten Houten suffered increasingly from Parkinson's disease. Even under these difficult circumstances he displayed great strength of mind and humor until the very end of his active and fruitful life. Hans died in 1993. His wife died in 2000.

== Selected authored bibliography ==
- ten Houten, Johan Gerard (1963-07-01). "Johanna Westerdijk, 1883-1961". Journal of General Microbiology. 32 (1). Microbiology Society: 1–9. doi:10.1099/00221287-32-1-1. ISSN 0022-1287.
- Oort, A. J. P.; ten Houten, Johan Gerard (1970). "Professor Kerling, her life and work". Netherlands Journal of Plant Pathology. 76 (3). Royal Netherlands Society of Plant Pathology (Springer): 110–118. doi:10.1007/bf01974315. ISSN 0028-2944. S2CID 20035652.
- Kerling, L. C. P.; ten Houten, Johan Gerard; de Bruin-Brink, G. (1986). "Johanna Westerdijk: Pioneer Leader in Plant Pathology". Annual Review of Phytopathology. 24 (1). Annual Reviews: 33–41. doi:10.1146/annurev.py.24.090186.000341. PMID 19099363.
