= Buisman =

Buisman is a surname. Notable people with the surname include:

- Albert Sybrandus Keverling Buisman (1890–1944), Dutch civil engineer and Professor of Applied Mechanics
- Christine Buisman (1900–1936), Dutch phytopathologist
- Hendrik van Borssum Buisman (1873–1951), Dutch painter
- Jan van Borssum Buisman (1919–2012), Dutch painter
