= Aspergillus westerdijkiae =

Scientific classification
- Kingdom: Fungi
- Division: Ascomycota
- Class: Eurotiomycetes
- Order: Eurotiales
- Family: Aspergillaceae
- Genus: Aspergillus
- Species: A. westerdijkiae

Binomial name
- Aspergillus westerdijkiae Frisvad & Samson (2004)

Species of fungus

Aspergillus westerdijkiae is a species of fungus in the genus Aspergillus. It is from the Circumdati section. The species was first described in 2004. It has been reported to produce penicillic acid, ochratoxin A, xanthomegnin, viomellein, and vioxanthin.

A. westerdijkiae has been associated with decaying cheese rinds in the northeastern US in 2012, 2019 and 2023. ^{[3]}

== Growth and morphology ==
A. westerdijkiae has been cultivated on both Czapek yeast extract agar (CYA) plates and Malt Extract Agar Oxoid (MEAOX) plates. The growth morphology of the colonies can be seen in the pictures below.

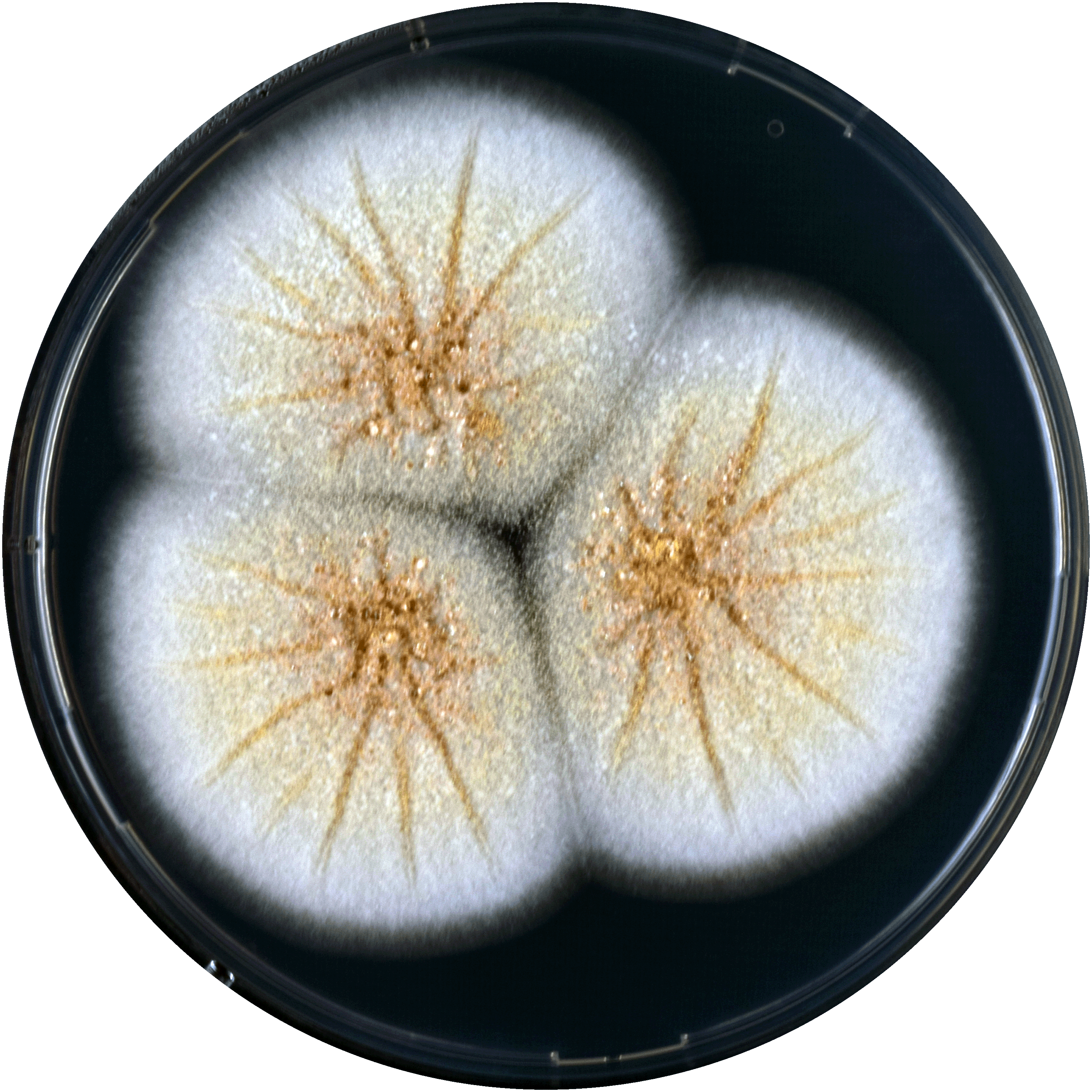
Aspergillus westerdijkiae growing on CYA plate

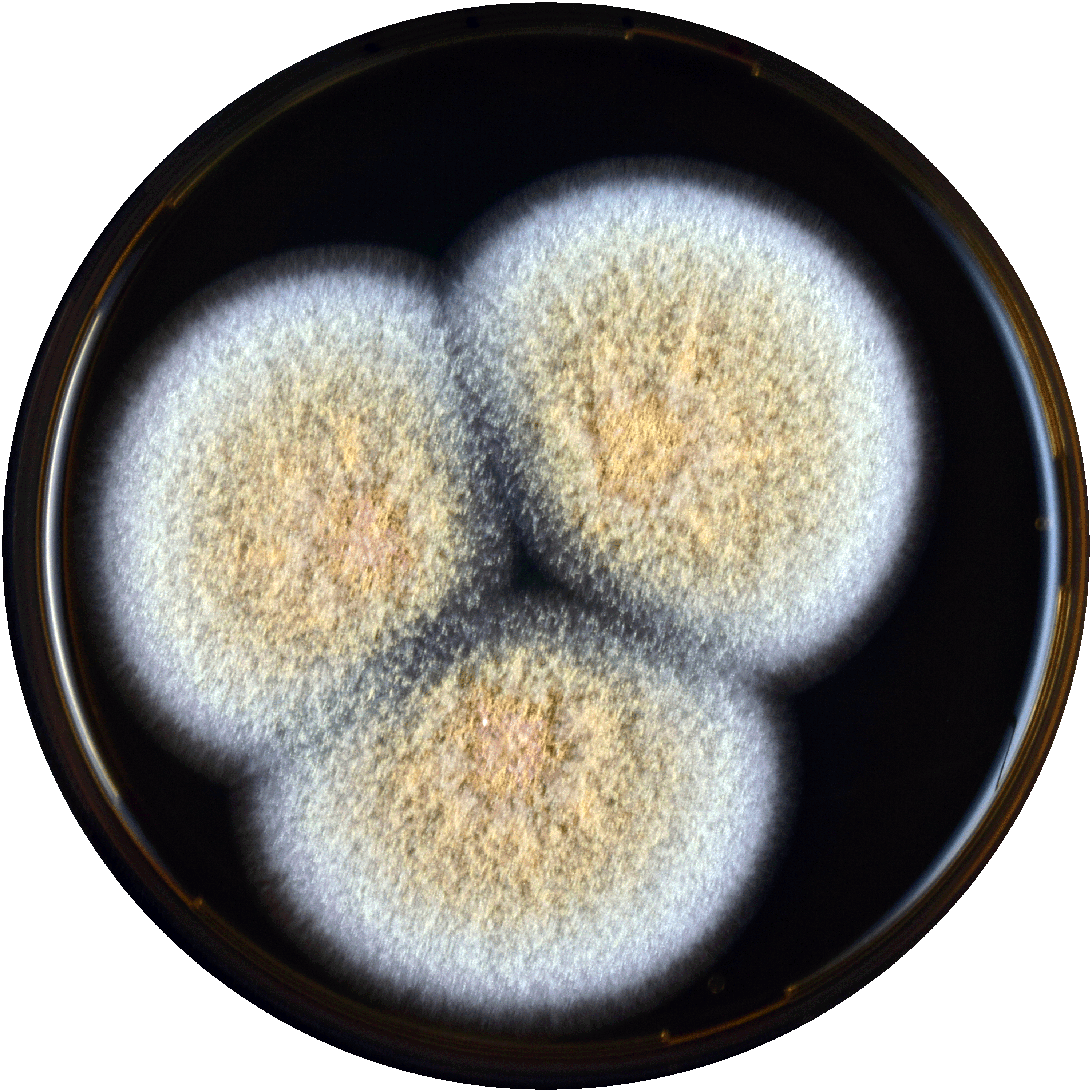
Aspergillus westerdijkiae growing on MEAOX plate
