= James Kipton Cronkite =

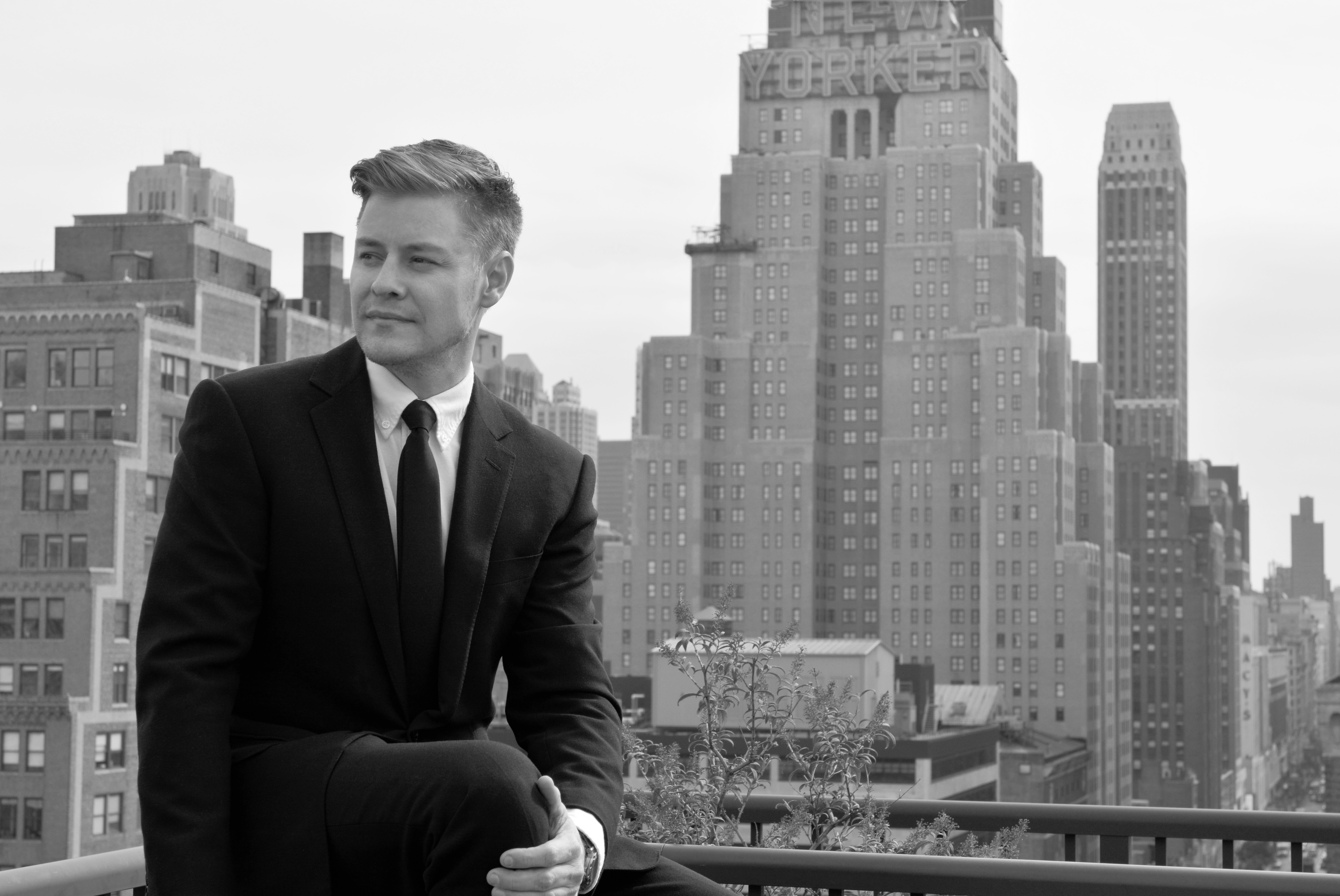
- Born: James Kipton Cronkhite; April 22, 1971 (age 54); Oklahoma
- Occupation(s): Art Advisor, Entrepreneur

James 'Kipton' Cronkite (born April 22, 1971) is a curator and expert in the arts. He has done projects in New York City, Miami, Los Angeles, and Beverly Hills.

== Family history ==
Cronkite has ancestral roots to early settlers of New Amsterdam (now New York City) in 1620. Herck Siboutsen was a ship carpenter and married Wyntie Teunis in 1642 in New Amsterdam. Kipton Cronkite is the thirteenth generation from the immigrant Herck Siboutsen, the progenitor of the American Cronkhite family. Herck arrived in New Netherland before 1642 when he married Wyntie Teunis in the Reformed Dutch Church in Manhattan. Herck was from Langedyck, Friesland, the Netherlands.
