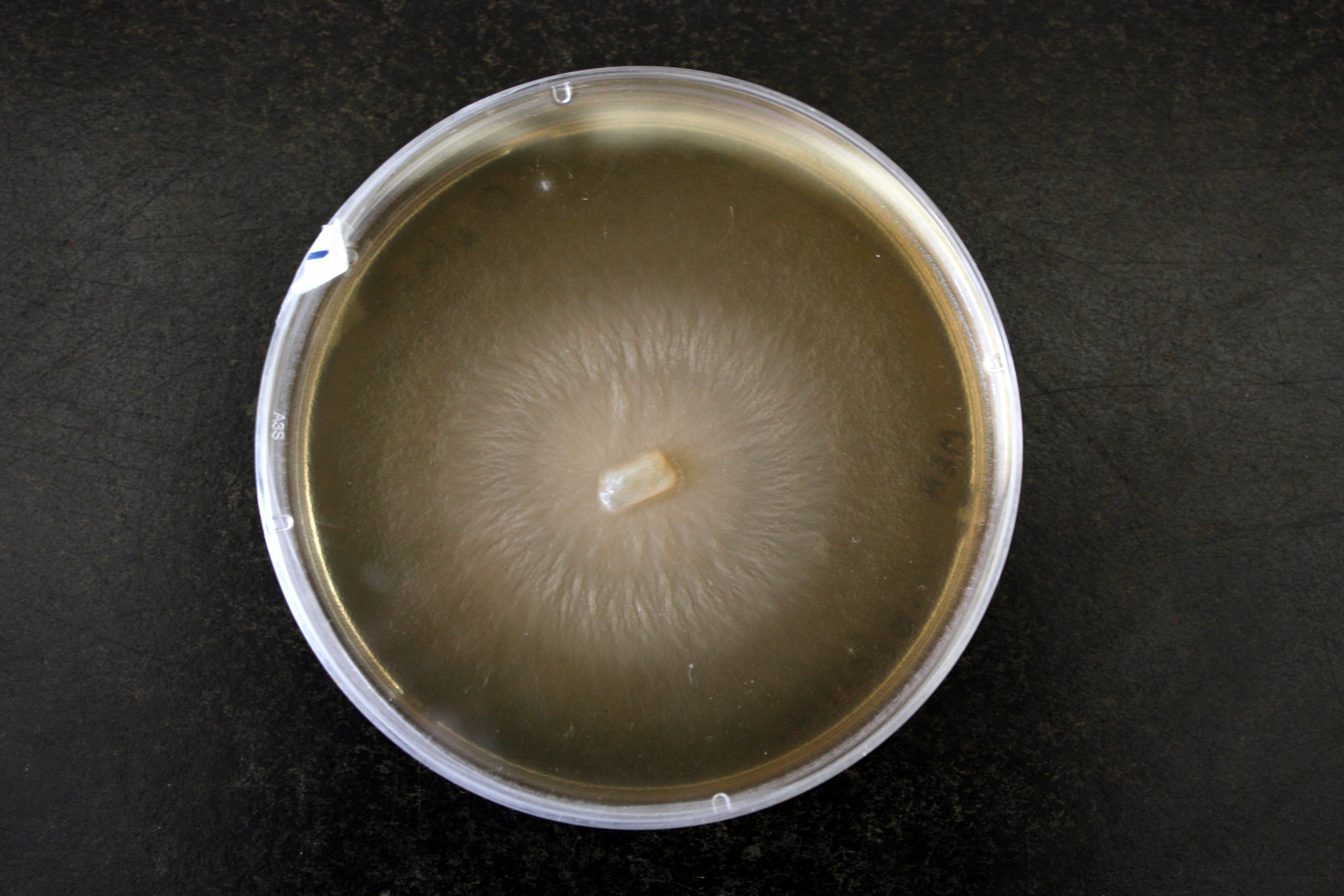

Scientific classification
- Kingdom: Fungi
- Division: Ascomycota
- Class: Sordariomycetes
- Order: Ophiostomatales
- Family: Ophiostomataceae
- Genus: Ophiostoma
- Species: O. ulmi

Binomial name
- Ophiostoma ulmi (Buisman) Melin & Nannf. (1934)

Synonyms
- Graphium ulmi M.B.Schwarz (1922); Ceratostomella ulmi Buisman (1932); Ceratocystis ulmi (Buisman) C.Moreau (1952)

= Ophiostoma ulmi =

Species of fungus

Ophiostoma ulmi is a species of fungus in the family Ophiostomataceae. It is one of the causative agents of Dutch elm disease. It was first described under the name Graphium ulmi, and later transferred to the genus Ophiostoma.

Dutch elm disease originated in Europe in the early 1900s. Elm trees were once an ecologically valuable tree that dominated mixed broadleaf forests, floodplains, and low areas near rivers and streams. They were planted in urban settings because of their aesthetic appeal and their ability to provide shade due to their V like shape. An outbreak of Dutch elm disease in the 1920s and again in the 1970s was responsible for the death of more than 40 million American elm trees.

Ophiostoma ulmi was the first known cause of Dutch elm disease. Since its discovery in 1910, new forms of the fungus, specifically Ophiostoma novo-ulmi, have emerged and appear to be more resistant to control measures and more aggressive in their infection.

== Host range and symptoms ==
Ophiostoma ulmi has a relatively narrow host range as it infects only elm trees (Ulmus spp.) and Zelkova carpinifolia. Habitat preferences of elms play a large part in determining their susceptibility as a host for Dutch elm disease. For example, of the three native European elm species (Ulmus glabra Huds., Ulmus laevis Pall. and Ulmus minor), all are susceptible to infection by O. ulmi, but Ulmus glabra has a much smaller chance of being inoculated than Ulmus minor. This is because the insect vector prefers the warm humid habitat of Ulmus minor to the cold hemiboreal habitat of Ulmus glabra. For this reason, Ulmus minor has been almost eliminated by the disease. In North America, Ulmus americana, U. thomasii, U. alata, U. serotina and U. rubra are listed as highly susceptible to Dutch Elm disease, while U. crassifolia is less threatened.

Ophiostoma ulmi causes symptoms commonly associated with most vascular wilts. Trees that have been infected by a vector will exhibit symptoms of leaf wilting and yellowing on branches and twigs that have been colonized by the Scolytid beetle. These symptoms are most often apparent from July into the autumn months. Trees that have contracted the disease via root grafts will often proceed much more quickly because the whole tree is compromised at once. Diagnosis of this disease is usually done by examining the xylem tissue of twigs and branches of the trees. Symptoms of brown streaking that runs in the direction of the grain of the wood, and tylosis formation by the tree as a reaction to the fungal infection are characteristic of this disease.

Breeding efforts began as early as the 1920s to try to combat this disease, and some crosses bred from resistant Asian species of elm and susceptible European species have shown a decrease in susceptibility to the pathogen. However, with the introduction of Ophiostoma novo-ulmi many of these resistant species struggle to survive.

== Environment ==
Ophiostoma ulmi infects the bark and xylem tissue of elm trees. It has been found in northern Africa and Oceania, but the vast majority of elms that are or have been colonized by O. ulmi can be found in Europe, west central Asia, and North America. While there is some speculation about how the disease traveled to North America, most experts agree that it was the fault of humans.

In the spring, trees produce what is known as “springwood” from the stored starches of the previous growing season. This tissue is characterized by long xylem vessels with relatively thin walls, making it the ideal habitat for the pathogen. In springwood, the fungus spreads rapidly, and it is likely that the tree will die. Later in the growing season, the elm will utilize sugars produced by the leaves to nurture the formation of “summerwood”. Summerwood vessels are typically shorter with thicker walls, making it harder for the infection to spread.

The pathogen enters its host with assistance from the Scolytid beetle, and will colonize the tunnels, or breeding galleries, made by the insect. The greatest impact of this disease is seen in urban settings and in trees that have previously been impaired by drought or insects.

O. ulmi prefers a subtropical climate for sporulation, with optimal temperatures between 27.5 °C and 30 °C and high moisture, which has largely limited the pathogen's reach in high altitudes and northern latitudes. The formation of other structures can tolerate cooler environments. Conidia will form at or around 20 °C, while perithecia form at 8-10 °C. Subjection to high summer temperatures combined with low moisture content and ensuing low nutrient levels in the bark of elm trees greatly restricts sporulation of the fungi. Because of this, it is common for the fungus to avoid branches with small diameters and localize in areas with thick bark, high moisture, and abundant nutrients.

Chemical control of this disease through insecticides and fungicides has not proven successful in the past and is often expensive. Many communities have adopted cultural practices to help manage the spread of this disease. This includes sanitation, avoiding planting elm monocultures and breaking root grafts between elms.

== Disease cycle ==
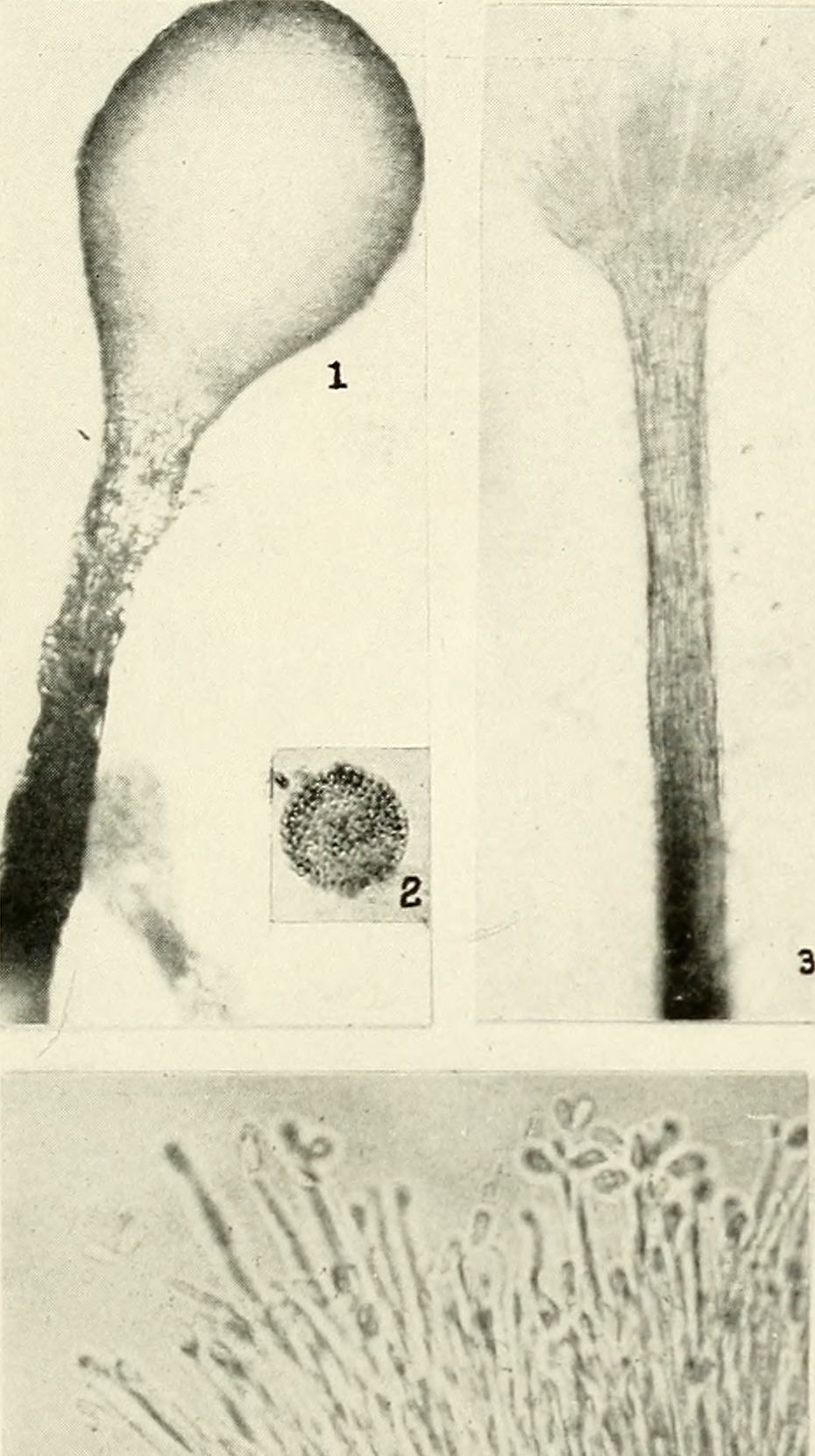
Asexual synnema can overwinter in bark and wood, and can be spread by beetle vectors.

Ophiostoma ulmi can reproduce asexually by overwintering in both the bark and upper layers of dead or dying elm wood as mycelia and synnemata. Synnemata produce conidia that are sticky and can be spread by vectors. In Dutch elm disease, the vectors that transmit Ophiostoma ulmi are Scolytid beetles. The conidia stick to the bodies of adult beetles and are spread throughout the tunnels (galleries) the beetle makes as it eats. Once in a tunnel, the spores will germinate to produce mycelium. During the late winter months and early spring, mycelia spread rapidly. At the same time, the fungus secretes enzymes that break down the cell walls of the tree and allow the mycelia to grow into the xylem tissue. Here, it will release millions of conidia that travel with the xylem sap. As the fungus grows it creates blockages in the vascular system of the tree, causing the characteristic symptom of wilting in the leaves. As new beetles bore through the xylem tissue, they come into contact with conidia in the sap which stick to their bodies and can be transmitted to other trees that they feed on. The disease can also be spread if mature roots of an infected tree graft to another tree and the conidia travel through xylem sap to the new host.

The fungi can also reproduce sexually. O. ulmi is a heterothallic ascomycete disease with mating types A and B. When these mating types are present in the same host, ascospores will be produced inside of perithecia. The perithecia can form singly or in large groups, and typically will have a long neck like structure with a black ball at the top. This ball contains the asci and ascospores. Once they are mature, the ascospores are released from an opening in the perithecia in a sticky liquid that can attach to the body of the Scolytid beetle and be spread throughout the host or to new hosts.
