= Bernice Cronkhite =

American educator and political scientist

Bernice Brown Cronkhite (23 July 1893 – 3 August 1983) was an educator and former dean of Radcliffe College, working there for thirty-six years. She was the first woman at Radcliffe College to earn a doctorate in political science.

== Biography ==
Born in Calais, Maine, Cronkhite earned a Bachelor of Arts degree from Radcliffe College in 1916, her Master's degree in 1918, and her Ph.D. in 1920. She became the first woman at Radcliffe College to receive a doctorate in political science, her thesis entitled, "On the Status of Armed Merchantmen". At the age of 29 in 1922, she became the dean of Radcliffe College, making her the youngest person to become a dean in the United States. She then served as the first dean for the Radcliffe graduate school from 1934 until her retirement in 1959. Although she retired, she remained a vice president and trustee of Radcliffe College until 1960, when she was named dean emeritus.

Cronkhite was the primary author of a 1956 report issued by Radcliffe College which summarized the experiences of several hundred Ph.D. holders from the institution. In 1957, she raised funds to establish a women's dormitory in Cambridge, Massachusetts. In her thirty-six years of service to Radcliffe College, she had worked there longer than any other senior officer in the institution.

She died on 3 August 1983 at the Stillman Infirmary of the Harvard University Health Services in Cambridge, Massachusetts. The Cronkhite Graduate center at Radcliffe College was named in her honor, as a tribute to the 70 years that she was connected with the institution.

== Works ==
- Handbook for College Teachers (1950)
- Graduate Education for Women: The Radcliffe Ph.D. (1956)
- The Times of My Life (1982)
