= Marie Beatrice Schol-Schwarz =

Dutch phytopathologist (1898–1969)

Bea Schwarz
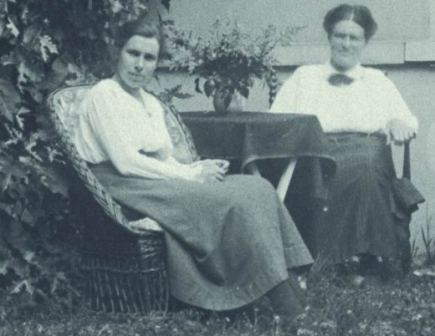
- Bea Schwarz (left) and her doctoral advisor Johanna Westerdijk in 1922
- Born: Marie Beatrice Schwarz; 12 July 1898; Batavia, Dutch East Indies
- Died: 27 July 1969 (aged 71); Baarn, Netherlands
- Education: Utrecht University
- Scientific career
- Fields: Phytopathology
- Thesis: Das Zweigsterben der Ulmen, Trauerweiden und Pfirsichbäume (Twig cancer in elms, weeping willows and peach trees)
- Doctoral advisor: Johanna Westerdijk
- Author abbrev. (botany): M.B.Schwarz

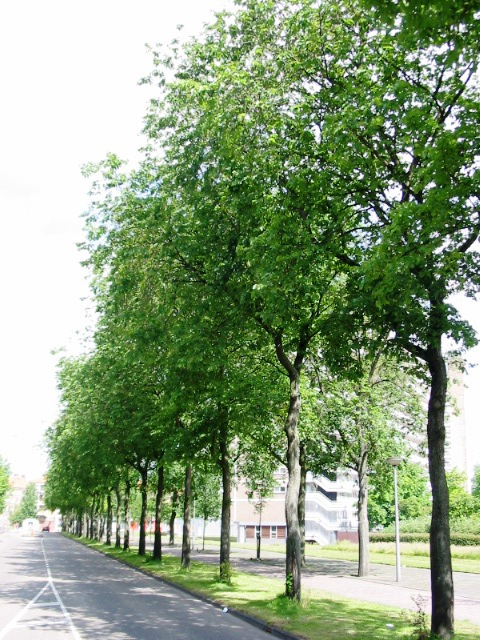
Ulmus × hollandica 'Bea Schwarz' in Amsterdam, Netherlands in 2004

Marie Beatrice "Bea" Schol-Schwarz (12 July 1898 – 27 July 1969) was the Dutch phytopathologist who discovered the causal fungus of Dutch elm disease. She first studied pathogens afflicting peanuts and later the fungus Phialophora.

== Biography ==
Marie Beatrice Schwarz was born on 12 July 1898 in Batavia in the Dutch East Indies (present-day Jakarta, Indonesia).

She studied at the Utrecht University in the Netherlands, where she was Johanna Westerdijk's first PhD student. During her studies in 1922, she discovered the causal fungus of Dutch elm disease. Schwarz spent most of her early professional life studying pathogens afflicting the groundnut Arachis hypogaea at the agricultural research station in Bogor.

The elm tree Ulmus × hollandica 'Bea Schwarz' was named for her in recognition of her research into the cause of Dutch elm disease.

Marrying in 1926, she retired from research to raise a family. When the East Indies were invaded by the Japanese army in 1942, Schwarz and her husband were interned in separate camps, her husband dying soon afterwards. After liberation, Schwarz and her two sons returned to the Netherlands, where she joined the Centraal Bureau voor Schimmelcultures (Central Bureau for Fungus Cultures) in Baarn, studying various fungi and writing a monograph on the genus Epicoccum.

After her second retirement, she continued to study the genus Phialophora despite her rapidly failing health. Shortly before her death in 1969, she was made an Officer in the Order of Orange Nassau in recognition of her contribution to phytopathology

Schwarz died on 27 July 1969, at the age of 71, in Baarn.

== Eponymy ==
The elm cultivar 'Bea Schwarz' was named for Dr. Schwarz.
