= Beetle kill in Colorado =

Environmental issue in Colorado, United States

The mountain pine beetle has killed large numbers of the lodgepole pine trees in the northern mountains of the US state of Colorado. The more recent outbreak of another bark beetle pest, the spruce beetle, is threatening higher-elevation forests of Engelmann spruce. Chemical prevention is effective but too costly for large-scale use. Dead trees increase the incidence of wildfires. Uses have been found for the dead wood including composting and in construction, and potentially to make biochar.

== Statistics ==
Mountain pine beetles infest the lodgepole pine, which makes up 8% of Colorado's 22 million acres (89,000 km^{2}) of forests. Lodgepole pines are found at elevations between 6,000–11,000 feet (1,800–3,400 m). A previous notable outbreak occurred in Colorado in the 1970s but was significantly less detrimental than the current infestation. Of the 1,760,000 acres (7,100 km^{2}) of lodgepole pine, about 70% have been damaged. High temperatures have allowed beetle infestations at higher elevations. According to a recent study, pine beetles have expanded their infestation by 400,000 acres (1,600 km^{2}). The infestation is primarily concentrated in the state's northern mountains. The infestation has been moving north and east from the Granby and Winter Park area towards Larimer County. It is estimated that beetle kill will leave behind a deforested area the size of Rhode Island.

The Colorado State Forest Service releases an annual report entitled Report on the Health of Colorado's Forests. The most recent survey, published in January 2017, presented the following statistics:

- One in 14 trees are dead in Colorado forests
- The number of gray-brown standing-dead trees has increased 30 percent since 2010 to 834 million
- Colorado's mountain pine beetle epidemic killed trees across 3.4 million acres
- The continuing spruce beetle epidemic has killed trees across 1.7 million acres

== Uses of beetle killed wood ==
Although beetle kill has resulted in a significant amount of dead trees, there are some options for use of the trees after they are killed. For instance, Summit County has begun composting by combining wood chips from beetle kill trees with other organic materials. By doing this, they are creating a product that could be used in landscaping and re-vegetation projects.

The ancient practice of biochar is also emerging as an option. A product of the bio char process is a synthetic gas that can be used as fuel. Some forestry experts predict this fuel can be used to power plants where beetle kill wood is processed.

Beetle kill wood is also being used in local projects. Multiple housing complexes are beginning to use beetle kill wood to replace the siding of houses, like a condo complex at Copper Mountain which is replacing old siding with blue-stain wood, which is named for the dark color in the wood that is caused by fungus carried by the pine beetle. Snowboards, skis and guitars are also being crafted from beetle kill pine.

The Beetle Kill Trade Association has been established to "to unite and align the self interests of business invested in or interested in the removal and recycling of standing beetle killed lodgepole pines in order to remove obstacles to the creation of a viable, vibrant and sustainable market for products utilizing beetle kill pines as raw material."

== Prevention ==
There are different views regarding beetle kill in Colorado. Some view it as a natural cycle while others believe it should be prevented. Unfortunately, such prevention measures are very expensive and not practical. Chemical treatments applied to lodgepole pines in the spring is effective, but the costs are $50 per tree in addition to annual treatments as needed.

Werner Kurz has pointed out that hundreds of millions of tons of carbon will be released into the atmosphere as the dead timber decays or burns, contributing to climate change that may further devastate Western forests. He advocates logging most of the dead trees and replanting quickly.

== See also ==
- Rocky Mountain bark beetle infestation
