= Deforestation in British Columbia =

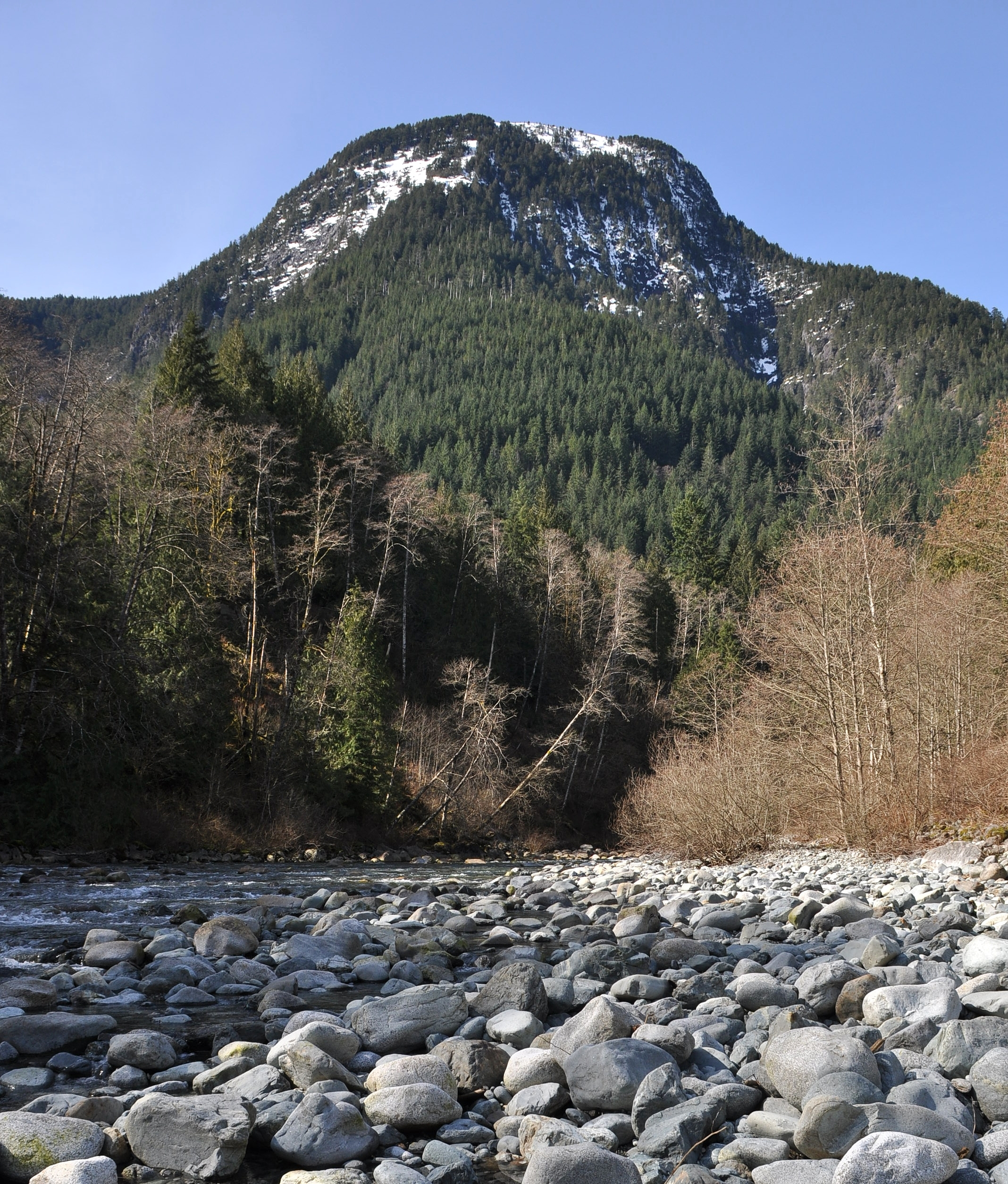
Evan's Peak, British Columbia

Deforestation in British Columbia has resulted in a net loss of 1.06 million hectares (2.6 million acres) of tree cover between the years 2000 and 2020. More traditional losses have been exacerbated by increased threats from climate change driven fires, increased human activity, and invasive species. The introduction of sustainable forestry efforts such as the Zero Net Deforestation Act seeks to reduce the rate of forest cover loss. In British Columbia, forests cover over 55 million hectares, which is 57.9% of British Columbia's 95 million hectares of land. The forests are mainly composed (over 80%) of coniferous trees, such as pines, spruces and firs.

== Environmental issues ==
Deforestation has negative impacts on British Columbia's environment and diversity even though it is necessary for population expansion and benefits for the Canadian economy.

=== Carbon emissions and greenhouse gases ===
Carbon emissions from deforestation is an important issue to look at with the increasing problem of global warming. Currently, about 4% of B.C.'s total green house gas (GHG) yearly emissions are from deforestation, which is quite a low percentage compared to B.C.'s total GHG emissions, and works out to be about 6,200 hectares of forest land is converted to non-forest use per year. The B.C. forest sector has had a large reduction in the amount of GHG from use of fossil fuels used in deforestation, going down from 4 million tons of carbon emissions in 1990 to 1.8 million tons in 2006. The reduction in deforestation B.C. over the years has been favorable to the reduction in carbon emissions, as forests clean the air by collecting both carbon and pollutants.

=== Species diversity ===
Species diversity is an important ecological part of B.C.'s forests and the act of deforestation can reduce the diversity by taking away crucial environments for both the plant and animal species to live in. There are currently 116 species, which is approximately 10% of species in B.C., that are on the B.C. Conservation Data Centre's Red List which are endangered species associated with the forest. Deforestation events such as agriculture, introduction of exotic species and timber production threaten the species. After deforestation events, the replanting of trees also had a decrease in diversity of the number of tree species per area due to dominated by single tree species. Currently, changes have been made in replanting strategies by planting different species in one area, which has reduced the problem of dominating species.

Deforestation has also had consequences for canopy-dwelling lichens and the wildlife that depend on them. In the inland temperate rainforests, old-growth conifer stands develop exceptionally heavy loads of "hair" lichens such as Bryoria and Alectoria. These lichens are a critical winter food for the endangered deep-snow mountain caribou, which feed on them for nearly half the year. Industrial logging and short-rotation forestry sharply reduce stand-level lichen abundance, since the dense branch architecture and stable microclimate that support these lichens only emerge in forests older than about 120–150 years. As a result, continued fragmentation of old growth not only decreases biodiversity directly but also undermines the survival of species reliant on these canopy food webs.

=== Soil composition ===
The soil composition is affected by different deforestation processes of removing trees as it changes the soil productivity through compaction or removal. The soil holds more than just the nutrients and plants in the forests, it consists of inorganic material, organic matter, air, water, and many micro and macro-organisms. The act of deforestation requires the forest sector to build roads, which decrease the productive land base, to be able to access the trees which went down from 4.6% of the area harvest in the mid-1990s to 3.5% in 2008. New stricter enforcement of laws regarding soil disturbance has dramatically reduced the degree of soil disturbances to the harvested area from 43 enforcement actions in 1995 to only 3 in 2008. Soil conservation is an important environmental issue to consider as it maintains water quality, ecosystem productivity, and future economic benefits.

=== Water ===
Water is an essential part to the ecosystem of forests including the plants and animal species survival, stream, rivers and lakes habitats and also human activities. The act of deforestation can affect the quality of water, quantity of water as well as the aquatic ecosystems located in the forests. When deforestation takes place by the forest sector, the water quality can be affected by sedimentation, pollution and changes in water levels. When roads are put in to cross streams and rivers, 94% of the roads crossings have low to moderate potential to deliver sediment to a stream, When the deforestation takes place near a stream, riparian techniques are used to conserve the tree density around the stream to protect and provide many benefits to the water quality, quantity and stability of the aquatic ecosystem. With 87% of the riparian area within the deforested area being in properly functioning conditions, the forest sector has high conservation efforts to protect the water within forest.

The passage of fish species to upstream and downstream habitats can be an essential part of survival and can be affected by deforestation practices, especially the building of roads by forest sector. With only 42% of the road stream crossings having a low effect on the passage of fish species, the remainder of crossings have a high to moderate risk of limiting fish passage. With an increase in stream crossings by roads from 421,830 in 2000 to 488,674 in 2005, a strategic plan is in process to address the fish passage concern.

== Zero Net Deforestation Act ==
In 2010 the province of British Columbia introduced a new piece of legislature called the Zero Net Deforestation Act, which plans to reduce green house gas emission as well as protect B.C.'s forests. The plan states that an area that is deforested and permanently cleared, an equal amount of trees will be planted for carbon storage and therefore will create a "net zero" effect on deforestation. With the province of British Columbia's target of a 33% decrease in green house emissions by 2020, this act will play a key role in the goal as the great density of forests in B.C. allow for greater absorption and storage of carbon.

== Forestry management in British Columbia ==
The province British Columbia in Canada is known for its high biodiversity with over 185 wildlife vertebrate, 171 bird species, and a variety of conifer and deciduous trees. In forestry management, it is important to recognize the cumulative effects of habitat and environmental changes that have the potential to threaten BC forests. Looking at sustainability in forest management requires comparing the ecological impacts of timber harvesting and of natural disturbances, such as fire, insects and disease.

=== Threats to British Columbia forests ===
==== Fire ====
In the late 19th century and early 20th century, forest fires were viewed in an anthropocentric manner as a major threat to public safety and a waste of timber that could be otherwise harvested for human use. While forest fires can have a significant negative effect on mature conifer stands, fire plays a key ecological role in Canadian boreal forest ecosystems. In addition to maintaining forest productivity, fire initiates and concludes vegetation succession, influences the age structure and species composition, keeps biodiversity high, modifies the distribution of insects and disease, influences nutrient cycling, maintains diversity, prevents soil erosion, and stabilizes ecosystems. The relationship between fire and stand (tree) development is complex and requires careful consideration.

==== Human activity ====
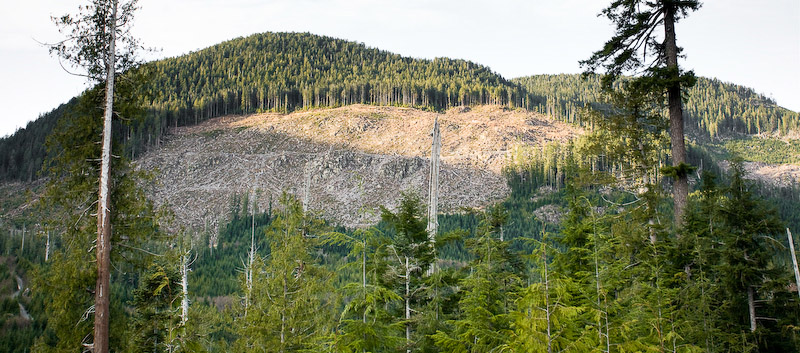
Clear cut in the Gordon River Valley near Port Renfrew, BC.

British Columbia is one of the world's largest exporters of wood fibre. In 2015 it was reported that British Columbia forestry supports 145,800 jobs and 7000 businesses, with an annual revenue of 15.7 billion dollars. Nationally, Canada's deforestation can be attributed to urban development of transportation corridors and recreation (19%), hydroelectric development (10%), the forestry sector (10%), and other natural resource extraction industries (8%). British Columbia enforces a cap on the allowable annual cut by setting the maximum amount of timber allowed to be harvested by each company. In the province, 8.1% of British Columbia is protected from harvesting, these are known as protected areas.

==== Invasive species ====
Invasive species are those that are not native to a region, and have the ability to displace local species and disrupt natural ecological processes. The mountain pine beetle has a significant negative effect on mature conifer stands. The occurrence of pine beetle outbreaks are influenced by warmer temperatures from mild winters which reduce the mortality of beetle larvae during the winter. From 1995 - 2005, British Columbia experienced a decline in the health of conifer trees and this was found to be correlated with the increase in the proportion of beetle-attacked conifers. In addition to the mountain pine beetle, other destructive invasive species include bark beetles, douglas fir beetles, spruce beetles, spruce leader weevil, and western spruce budworm. Climate change impacts the distribution, life cycles, habitats, and mortality rates of these invasive insects. With a warming climate, there is a greater accumulation of the larvae of invasive species which increases the feeding and predation stresses on tree hosts. The impact from invasive species in British Columbia are both ecological and economic, due to the disruption of the timber supply available for harvest.

=== Managing British Columbia forest threats ===
==== Management of fire ====
Natural wildfire provides many benefits to forest ecosystems such as forest succession, species longevity, stocking, biodiversity, pest control, and soil fertility. Human activity interrupts the natural impact of wildfires making them stronger and more detrimental to the forests. To mitigate the impacts of fire on the landscape, management techniques should reduce potential for fire-starters and increase the capacity for fire suppression. A common management method is called prescribed burning. Prescribed burning is done by intentionally setting fires in specific areas to promote the biodiversity and health of forests, while restricting the ability of it to have severe short-term socioeconomic impacts. In order to reduce the risk to resources, infrastructure, and public health, cut-block boundaries such as roads or skid trails are used as barriers.

==== Management of human activity ====
To address the human impacts on forests in British Columbia, management needs to plan for the long term (100–200 years in the future). The complexity of climate change and ecological systems means that management methods should extend to ecosystems overall, rather than only stands on trees. Management methods should also be multi-objective in practice in order to assess forest attributes such as biodiversity, timber production, carbon storage and recreation purposes.

A comprehensive management technique is called the Decision Support System (DSS). DSS outlines the complexity of actions with regards to forestry and addresses the consequences of different management techniques over a range of ecological, economic, and social indicators. This is done by highlighting potential conflicts, using a science-based framework, conveying knowledge about long-term dynamics of forest ecosystems, and providing guidance by projecting trends within indicators. Simulation models are useful to determine what the best method is for harvesting trees. These models can be used to maintain specific or at-risk ecosystem types by using scientific knowledge.

A provincial management method implemented by British Columbia is the Forest Practices Code. This code must be followed by all forestry companies and there are repercussions if rules of the code are broken. Penalties include fines, reduction of allowable size of clearcuts or the removal of a company's ‘right to cut’.

A common resource management method used in many fields is the precautionary principle. The precautionary principle states that when the impacts of an action are unknown, the action should not be executed. Within this principle is the concept of sustainable development of natural resources which requires that the stock of capital of a product be maintained, and only harvesting what is above the base-stock.

Landscape management is a technique for commercial forestry companies to implement by allowing for longer rotations between cutting. Depending on the characteristics of a region (i.e. soil productivity, topography, proximity to mills), certain areas can be managed specifically for intensive wood production, while leaving other areas untouched for regeneration. This technique requires the management of the entire forest, rather than an isolated section in order to take into account the social, environmental, and economic needs of a region

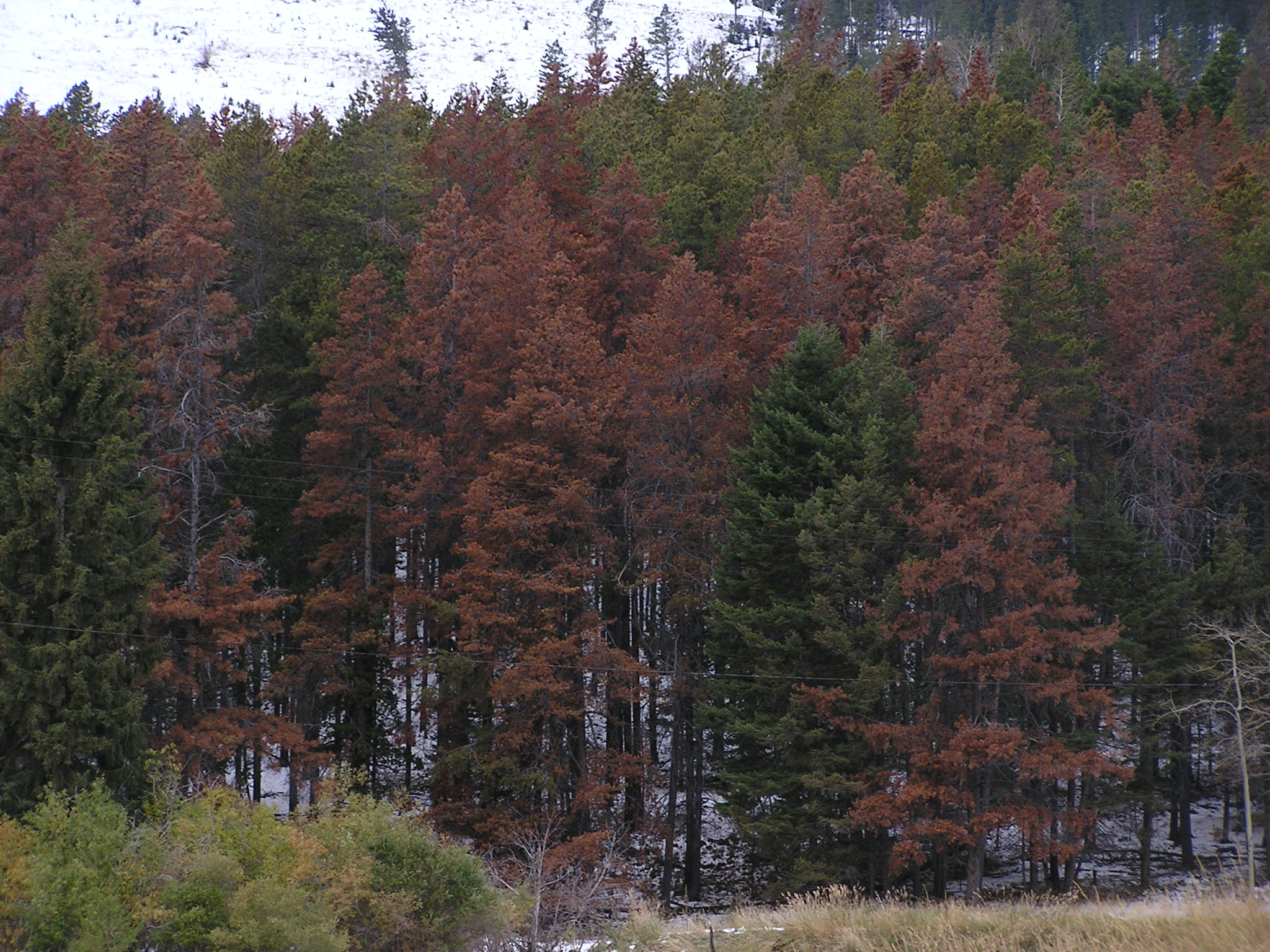
A stand of trees affected by Mountain Pine Beetles in Massachusetts, USA.

==== Management of invasive species ====
Management for invasive species requires monitoring, modelling, and assistance in promoting migration and genetic diversity. In addition to this, reducing the amount of timber harvested will conserve the present stand of trees. Monitoring insect and disease occurrences over long periods of time gives a better understanding of the effects of climate change and how forests respond to it. The information from monitoring can be used to model and forecast the range of potential future changes with indicators such as volume harvested, gross profit, ecosystem carbon storage, age-class distribution and patch-size distribution. The data from monitoring and modelling can be used to determine which tree species to breed or reintroduce in an area in order to increase tree stand resilience and reduce susceptibility to invasive species.

== See also ==
- Bowron clearcut
- Deforestation
- Deforestation in Canada
