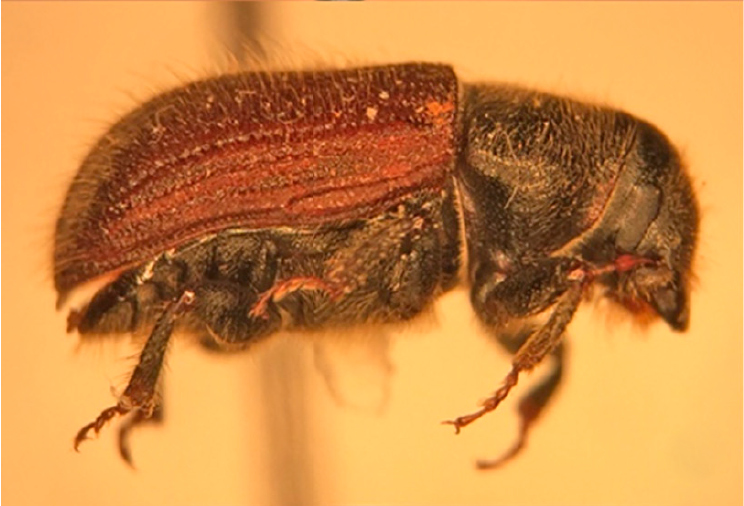

Scientific classification
- Kingdom: Animalia
- Phylum: Arthropoda
- Clade: Pancrustacea
- Class: Insecta
- Order: Coleoptera
- Suborder: Polyphaga
- Infraorder: Cucujiformia
- Family: Curculionidae
- Genus: Dendroctonus
- Species: D. rufipennis

Binomial name
- Dendroctonus rufipennis Kirby

= Dendroctonus rufipennis =

Great spruce bark beetle

Species of beetle

Dendroctonus rufipennis, the great spruce bark beetle, is a species of bark beetle native to British Columbia, Newfoundland and Labrador, Nova Scotia, Ontario, Quebec, Northern Manitoba, the Yukon, Alaska, Colorado, Wyoming, Montana, and Maine. They can seriously damage forests of spruce trees including Engelmann, White, Sitka, and Colorado blue spruce. Adults average 4 to 7 mm in length.

== Life cycle ==
The great spruce bark beetle Dendroctonus rufipennis, about 6 mm long, is one of the larger bark beetles found in spruce. White spruce and Engelmann spruce are the principal hosts. The beetles are attracted strongly to blowdowns, cull logs, and freshly-cut logs. Outbreaks of the beetle, a transcontinental North American species, have been devastating to white and Engelmann spruces throughout western North America, from Arizona to Alaska, while smaller outbreaks have occurred in Alberta and Saskatchewan. The species is the most serious pest of mature and overmature Alberta spruce in British Columbia; small-diameter, rapidly growing trees were least susceptible to attack or death from the beetle, and the greater susceptibility of large-diameter, slowly-growing trees was more closely related to recent radial growth than to diameter. Measures that maintain radial growth rates offer the most likely defence.

The initial attack in the lower trunk is indicated by the red boring dust in the bark crevices and by pitch tubes, especially when weakened or recently dead trees are attacked. Overwintering adults construct egg tunnels for brood 1 in June, and a second set of tunnels in late July for brood 2. Some members of brood 1 emerge as adults in late July and construct additional tunnels, while others overwinter as mature larvae and emerge as adults in July, along with another segment of the population that has overwintered as early larvae.

The insect has a 1-, 2-, or 3-year life cycle, with 2-year being the most common, in which the flight and attack period starts in June or soon after most of the snow around the trees has melted. About 6 galleries per 929 cm^{2}, each about 12.5 cm long and parallel with the grain of the wood, are made in the inner bark, and 3 to 4 groups of eggs are laid along the sides of the galleries, about 100 eggs per gallery. Eggs hatch in 3 to 4 weeks. Larvae vary in size from about one-quarter to fully grown by the onset of the dormant season. They resume development the following June, pupate during the summer, and transform to the adult stage in later summer or early fall. The adults generally emerge from the trees, fall or crawl to the ground, and re-enter the same tree to hibernate, often clumping together under the bark. They emerge the following spring and fly to green trees, blowdowns, cull logs, or stumps to start another generation. The beetle may have a 1-year cycle at lower elevations, on warmer sites, or during an abnormally warm year, reaching the adult stage before the onset of winter. The 3-year cycle occurs at high elevations, on cold sites, or during unseasonably cold years.

The blue stain fungus Leptographium abietinum may aggravate the damage caused by beetles. The beetles D. rufipennis and Polygraphus rufipennis carry this fungus, among others. When inoculated on to white spruce seedlings, it killed 71% of them, while the other fungi carried caused no mortality.

== Pest of commercial forestry ==
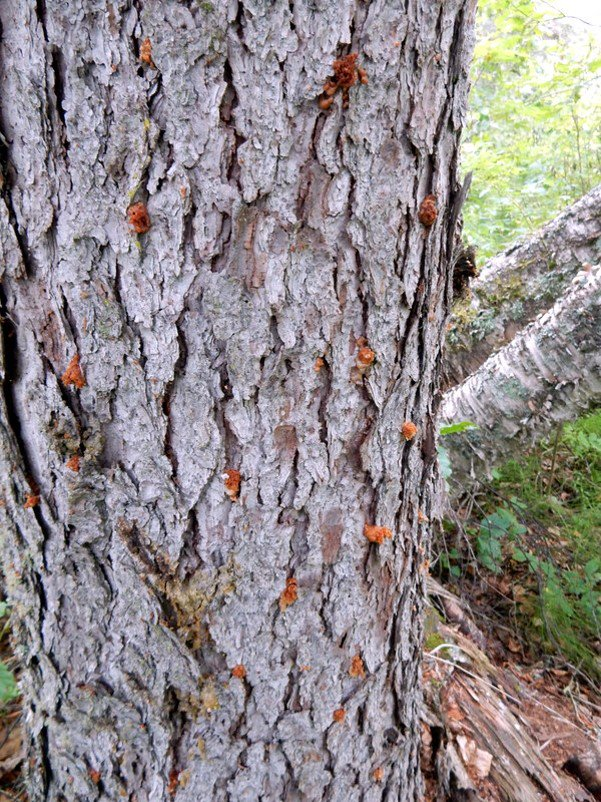
Spruce beetle pitch tubes on a tree in Tongass National Forest, Alaska

The great spruce bark beetle is one of many beetle species that have bred more rapidly due to global warming. Their spread has also been aided by loggers leaving stumps that the beetles can overwinter within. A specific factor is that drought induces beetle outbreaks. The overpopulation of beetles in some forests in Kenai, Alaska, has damaged several spruce species that are no longer able to survive there. The beetle destroyed 2,300,000 acres (9,300 km^{2}) (2 billion board feet) of spruce forests in Alaska from 1992 to 1999 (about 30 million trees per year at the peak), and 122,000 acres (490 km^{2}) of Utah forests in the 1990s (more than 3 million trees). Outbreaks from 1975 to 2000 were seen in Montana (loss of 25 million board feet), Idaho (loss of 31 million board feet), Arizona (loss of over 100 million board feet), and British Columbia (loss of 3 billion board feet). As of 2000, the beetle was responsible for the loss of about 400 million board feet annually. Dendroctonus rufipennis is also a part of the ecosystem in Colorado.

== See also ==
- Beetle kill in Colorado
- Bowron clearcut
- Rocky Mountain bark beetle infestation
