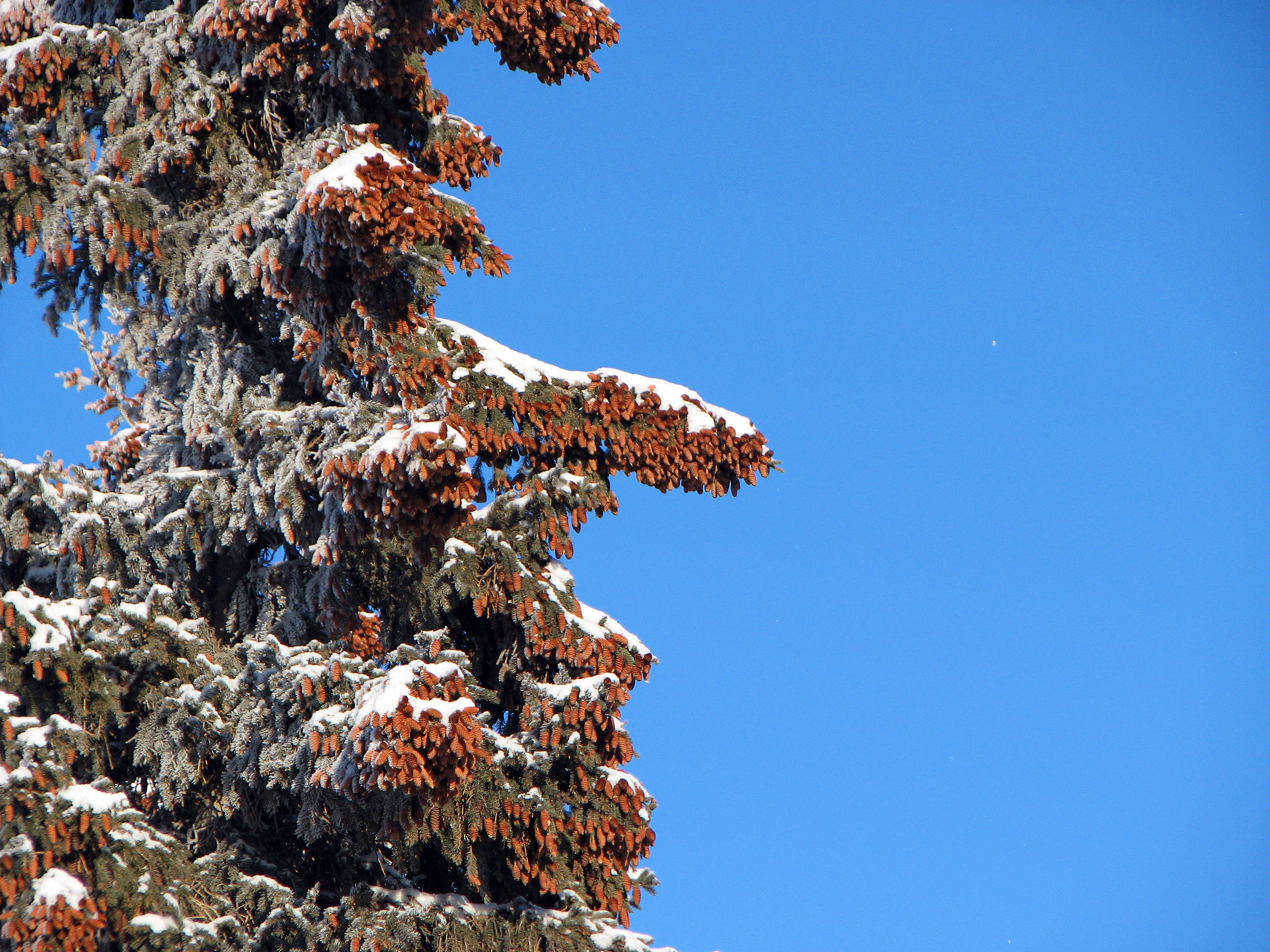
- Tree at Fort St. John, BC, Canada
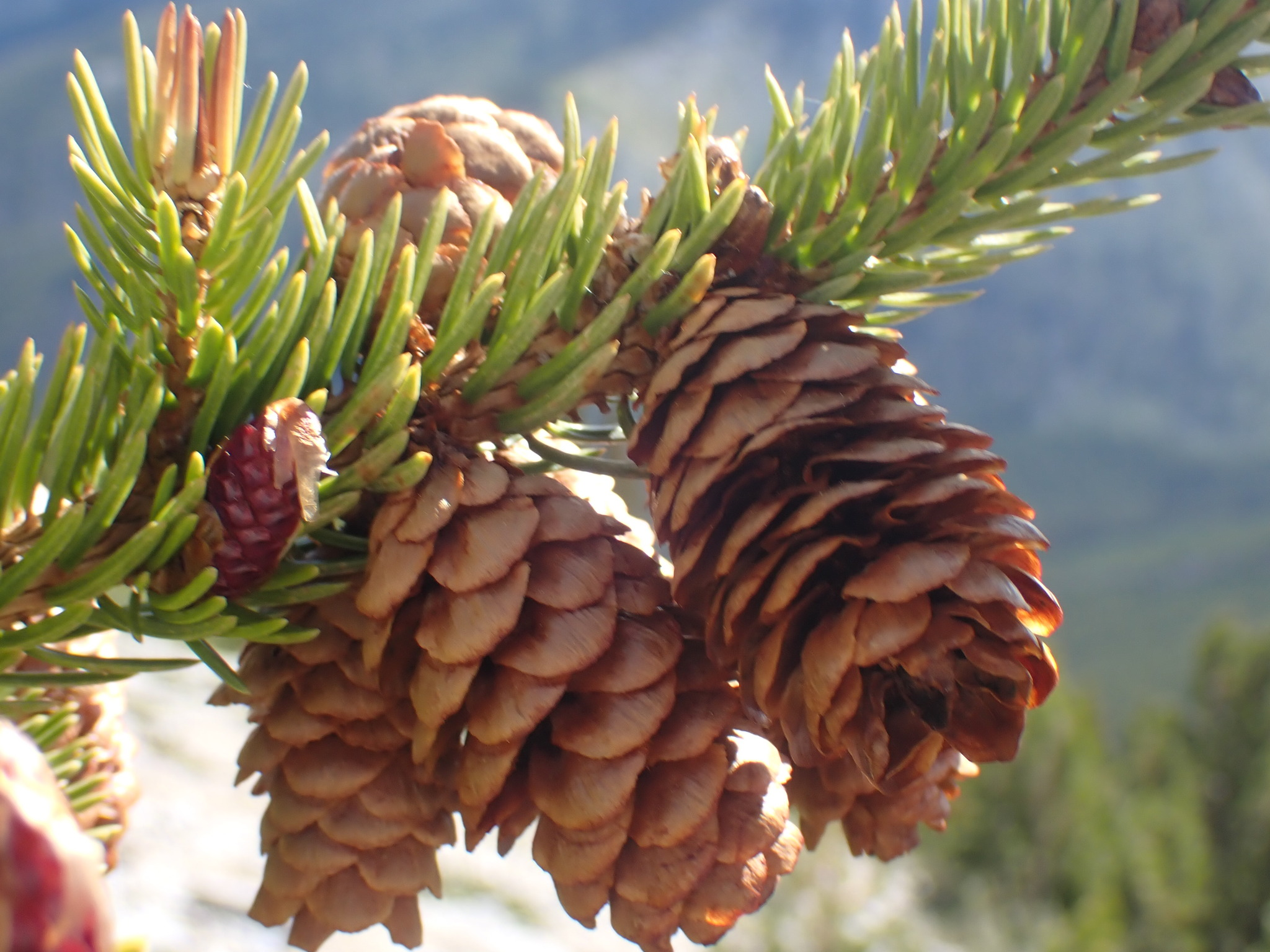
- Cones of Picea × albertiana

Scientific classification
- Kingdom: Plantae
- Clade: Tracheophytes
- Clade: Gymnosperms
- Division: Pinophyta
- Class: Pinopsida
- Order: Pinales
- Family: Pinaceae
- Genus: Picea
- Species: P. × albertiana

Binomial name
- Picea × albertiana S.Br.

= Picea × albertiana =

Hybrid species of conifer

Picea × albertiana (Alberta spruce, Interior spruce, or hybrid white spruce) is a nothospecies that is a natural cross between white spruce and Engelmann spruce. It is a dominant forest species in interior British Columbia where the ranges of the two parent species overlap.

== Description and distribution ==
The morphology exhibits characteristics of both parent species. The trees take irregular intermediate forms, which may vary in needle length, cone dimensions, cone scale texture, and twig pubescence. The species can grow up to 48 m (157 ft) in height, and live to be over 100 years old. There is significant evidence that the species complex is locally adapted to cold temperatures, and is specifically adapted to autumn cold hardiness.

The species is especially common in Canada, specifically in the Northwest Territories and Yukon, projecting east to Manitoba and down to southern British Columbia. It sporadically appears in the United States within the states of Washington, Montana, Idaho, Wyoming, and western South Dakota. Hybrid populations self-perpetuate without the presence of either parent species.

== Ecology ==
Interior spruce are hosts to the spruce beetle, which are deadly to infected stands of trees. For example, during the infestation that lead to the Bowron clearcut, 60% of mature spruce trees were killed in 175,000 hectares of forest over a few years.

Plant tissues of the species are colonized by bacteria of the genera Caballeronia and Paraburkholderia. This association has been studied for the potential nitrogen-fixing benefits to host trees.

== Classification ==
The complex was first published in 1907 by Stewardson Brown as Picea albertiana. It was soon recombined as Picea glauca var. albertiana by Charles Sprague Sargent in 1919, a treatment used by almost all sources until early in the 21st century, when Strong & Hills (2006) concluded the taxon was of hybrid origin.

P. engelmannii and P. glauca hybrids are now most often referred to as P. × albertiana in taxonomic literature, having now been accepted by the Plants of the World Online (POWO) database. Björk & Goward (2022) attempted to reclassify the nothospecies as Picea × darwyniana, as they believed Brown was actually describing a misidentified hybrid with black spruce. However, this was refuted by Strong (2023), who argued the rationale and name were invalid. Strong referred to P. glauca × P. engelmannii hybrids as P. albertiana subsp. albertiana, and P. engelmannii × P. glauca hybrids as P. a. subsp. ogilviei, though this distinction between the parentage sex is not accepted by POWO.

=== Synonyms ===
As of 2025, Plants of the World Online lists 11 synonyms of Picea × albertiana.

- Picea alba var. albertiana (S.Br.) Beissn.
- Picea × albertiana var. densata (L.H.Bailey) W.L.Strong & Hills
- Picea × albertiana subsp. ogilviei W.L.Strong & Hills
- Picea × albertiana var. porsildii (Raup) W.L.Strong & Hills
- Picea × darwyniana Björk & Goward
- Picea glauca subsp. albertiana (S.Br.) P.A.Schmidt
- Picea glauca var. albertiana (S.Br.) Sarg.
- Picea glauca var. densata L.H.Bailey
- Picea glauca subsp. ogilviei (W.L.Strong & Hills) Silba
- Picea glauca var. polsildii Raup
- Picea glauca subsp. polsildii (Raup) Silba

== See also ==
- Picea × lutzii, (Lutz's spruce), a natural hybrid between white spruce and Sitka spruce
