= Werner Kurz =

Canadian Forest Ecologist

- Occupations: Research Scientist, Canadian Forest Service
- Website: http://cfs.nrcan.gc.ca/directory/wkurz

Werner Kurz is a Canadian research scientist at Canada's Pacific Forestry Centre in Victoria, British Columbia. He is leading the development of an accounting system to assess potential climate change known as the National Forest Carbon Accounting System for Canada. Currently, his research focuses on using forest land to its maximum carbon efficiency, reducing the impact of natural disasters, and managing forests. Kurz holds a PhD in forest ecology from the University of British Columbia. He has made significant contributions to the Intergovernmental Panel on Climate Change (IPCC) and the work of the IPCC (including the contributions of many scientists) was recognized by the joint award of the 2007 Nobel Peace Prize.

== Areas of Research ==
=== Mountain Pine Beetles ===
One subject of Kurz's research is the effect of mountain pine beetles (Dendroctonus ponderosae) on forest ecosystems. His most recent research into this topic is the recent outbreak of mountain pine beetles in the forests of British Columbia. Due to the warmer climate of recent years, the beetles have been able to get to higher latitudes and have less die off during the winter. This has resulted in the largest-ever recorded outbreak of this insect. More than 32 million acres of forest have been killed by this outbreak since 2000. The beetle outbreak affects carbon dioxide emissions in two main ways. First, trees that are destroyed release carbon dioxide when they decompose which increases the levels of greenhouse gases in the atmosphere. Second, fewer trees are healthy and able to pull greenhouse gases out of the atmosphere. Research done by Kurz and his team show that if a solution is not found by 2020 the beetles will have killed enough forest to equal five years of carbon dioxide emissions from all the automobiles in Canada.

== Intergovernmental Panel on Climate Change ==
Kurz contributed to the Intergovernmental Panel on Climate Change (IPCC) reports including the 2019 Special Report on Climate Change and Land (SRCCL). His IPCC contributions and that of many scientists, was recognized by the joint award of the 2007 Nobel Peace Prize.
