= Rocky Mountain bark beetle infestation =

Ongoing environmental disaster

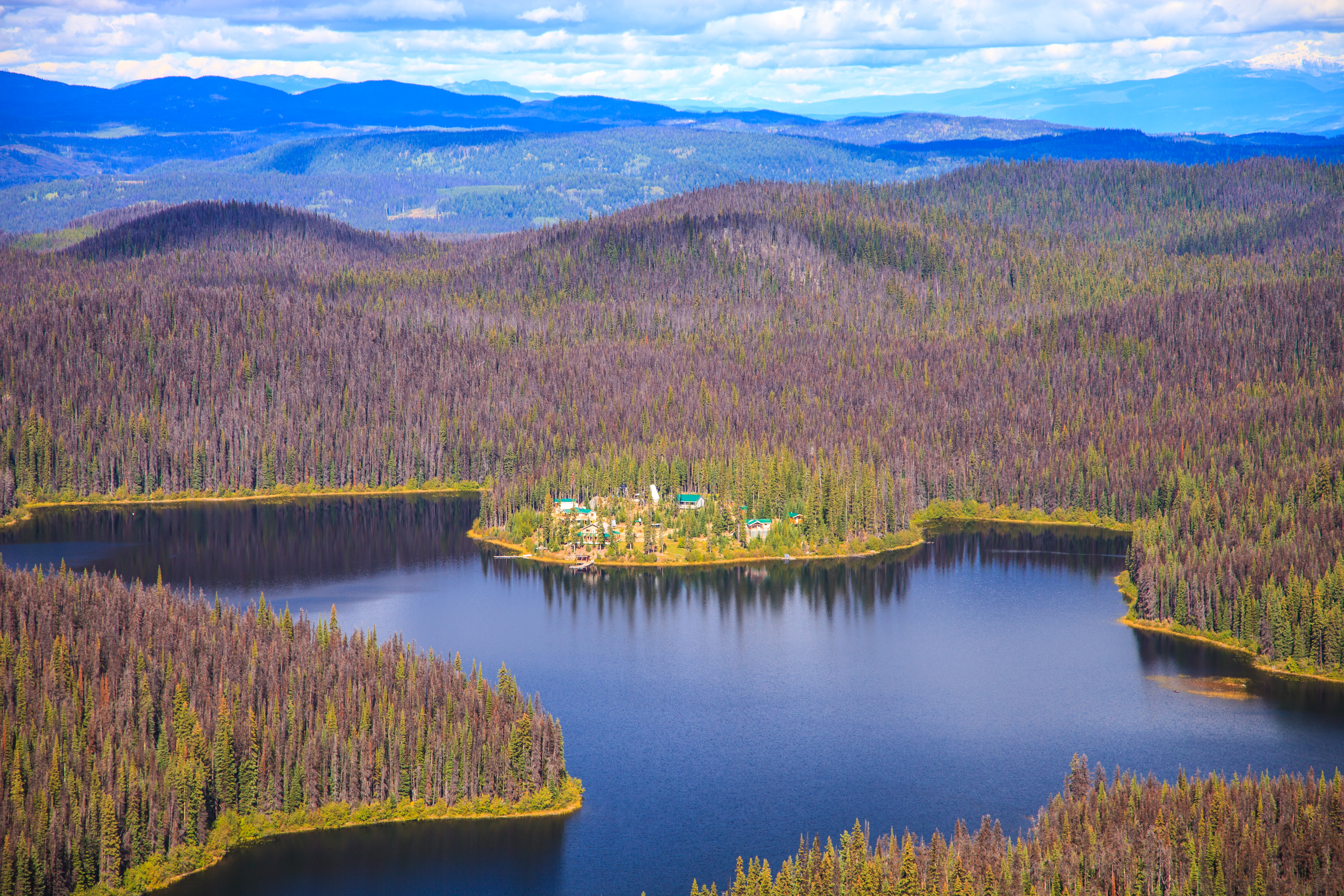
Skoatl Point, Canada, showing pine trees killed by beetles in 2011

The bark beetle infestation in the Rocky Mountains was first detected in 1996. It involved the Mountain pine beetle, which has since spread across millions of acres of dense forest land. In addition, Spruce beetle populations have also been growing in the area in recent years and are further contributing to the existing outbreak. One of the main factors limiting bark beetle population growth is the temperature they can survive at and climate change has raised the average temperature in the region resulting in warmer winters and hotter, drier summers. This not only sped up the bark beetle reproduction process by providing more time per year for them to complete their developmental stages (at lower elevations they now often complete generations in one year instead of two), moisture stressing due to hotter temperatures also weakens the trees’ defense against attacks by reducing resin production. Furthermore, forest management has also played a significant role as many forests in the region have very dense tree populations which facilitates faster spreading from tree to tree, as well as weakening tree defenses further by stressing them through excessive competition.

While the culling of the region's trees brings significant economic ramifications, ecosystems are also being profoundly impacted: affected watersheds are experiencing changes to storage and flow, and such high rates of tree mortality alters the exchange of gases between the biosphere and atmosphere. Forest disturbances such as fires usually have nebulous and far-ranging ecological impacts, and bark beetle infestations are no exception. Though many species are benefiting from the infestation and are showing higher rates of occurrence in affected forests, many show the opposite effect. Most notably, elk are avoiding beetle-killed forests even though they traditionally adapt well to many disturbances and capitalize on them, representing significant decrease in elk habitat. The loss of transpiration from beetle-killed trees has also increase groundwater contributions to affected watersheds, which may affect riverine ecosystems, as well as human water usage, by altering factors like water supply and quality. Finally, though forests act as carbon sinks that absorb atmospheric carbon, the high rate of tree mortality not only reduces forests’ capacity to absorb carbon, the large amounts of carbon already stored in beetle-killed trees is being released back into the atmosphere as they decompose.

== Bark beetles ==
The bark beetle is an insect of the subfamily Scolytinae, containing around 6000 species, which live and reproduce in the inner bark of trees. Upon successfully entering a tree, they mate and the female starts to burrow a labyrinth of tunnels running along the inner bark called egg galleries where she then lays her eggs. The larvae themselves continue feeding and excavate further across the inner bark until they reach adulthood and leave to find a new host to start the process anew. While most species of bark beetles prefer dead or dying hosts, some attack live trees with the preference of mature and over-mature ones, as well as trees weakened by external factors. Due to the bark beetle's tendency to target trees that are weak, late in life, or dead, they play an important role in the forest's nutrient cycle by hastening the decomposition of old trees to make way for the new. However, more aggressive species can become pests as they amass large populations, attack healthier trees, and turn into an infestation. The only direct defense trees have against bark beetles is the resin released when sapwood is breached, which can fill in the tunnels they dig and encase the insects entirely. However, many species of bark beetle carry symbiotic fungal spores on their bodies which they use to inoculate the sapwood. This prevents resin from flowing into the tunnels and provides food for the larvae but also hampers the flow of water and nutrients through the tree and accelerates its death.

== Management approaches ==
In response to the unprecedented spread of bark beetles in the Rocky Mountains and other parts of the western United States, the U.S. Forest Service formed the Western Bark Beetle Research Group (WBBRG) in 2007—a collaboration between scientists from three research stations that pools knowledge and resources to better understand the threat and eventually develop a strategy to combat it. In 2011, the WBBRG published the Western Bark Beetle Strategy. Self-described as “a modest strategy that reflects current budget realities”, it concedes that not all affected and at-risk forest lands can be covered with the resources at the project's disposal. Instead, it mainly focuses its efforts on important areas and the general mitigation of any immediate effects on the populace. The order of priorities for the strategy are (1) human safety, (2) recovery, and (3) resilience. With up to 100,000 beetle-killed trees falling in the United States per day, a significant threat is being posed to road safety, power transmission, and water lines so the removal of dead trees near these essential amenities is of paramount importance to the project and will be completed before the other two priorities which are deemed less time-sensitive. Once public safety is ensured, recovery efforts will consist of the removal of dead trees which would fuel potential fires, cone collection for specific species, replanting trees to accelerate habitat restoration, and the treatment and prevention of noxious weeds with native species. Simultaneously, resilience will be achieved by thinning at-risk forests to reduce stress from competition and replanting forests in appropriate densities. The strategy prioritizes the restoration of affected forests over preventing the spread of bark beetles as current direct prevention techniques like pheromone baiting and pesticides are meant for small-scale scenarios and are not even close to being cost-effective at combating the extreme scale of the infestation. Though the strategy does implement some direct prevention techniques, they are rarely used and are primarily for protecting high value trees and maintaining the aesthetic appeal of important tourism sites.

Despite the U.S. government's implementation of this strategy, it remains a stop-gap measure as no solution yet exists. However, scientists have been making strides towards better understanding the problem. Professor Diana Six at the University of Montana, whose work on forest entomology and pathology has received national attention, has been studying tree species that survive bark beetle outbreaks and her recent findings suggest that survivorship is genetically based and can be inherited. In an interview, she claims that past management strategies focus on resilience against bark beetles rather than adaptation. Instead, she proposes that the long-term sustainability of our forests relies on their adaptation to threats like bark beetles and drought, and that identifying the genetic markings that allow certain tree species to survive the current infestation may yield crucial information that can inform the development of future management approaches that support forest adaptation.

== See also ==
- Beetle kill in Colorado
