= Bowron clearcut =

Forest clearcut in British Columbia, Canada

The Bowron clearcut or the Bowron River clearcut was a forest clearcut near the Bowron River in British Columbia, Canada. It was once considered the largest clearcut in the world. A large timber salvage operation took place in the 1980s in response to a spruce beetle infestation. 15 million cubic meters of wood were harvested.

It was known as the "clear-cut you could see from space." Despite its reputation, clearcuts on Cape Breton as well as those found in Brazil are larger.

== Background ==
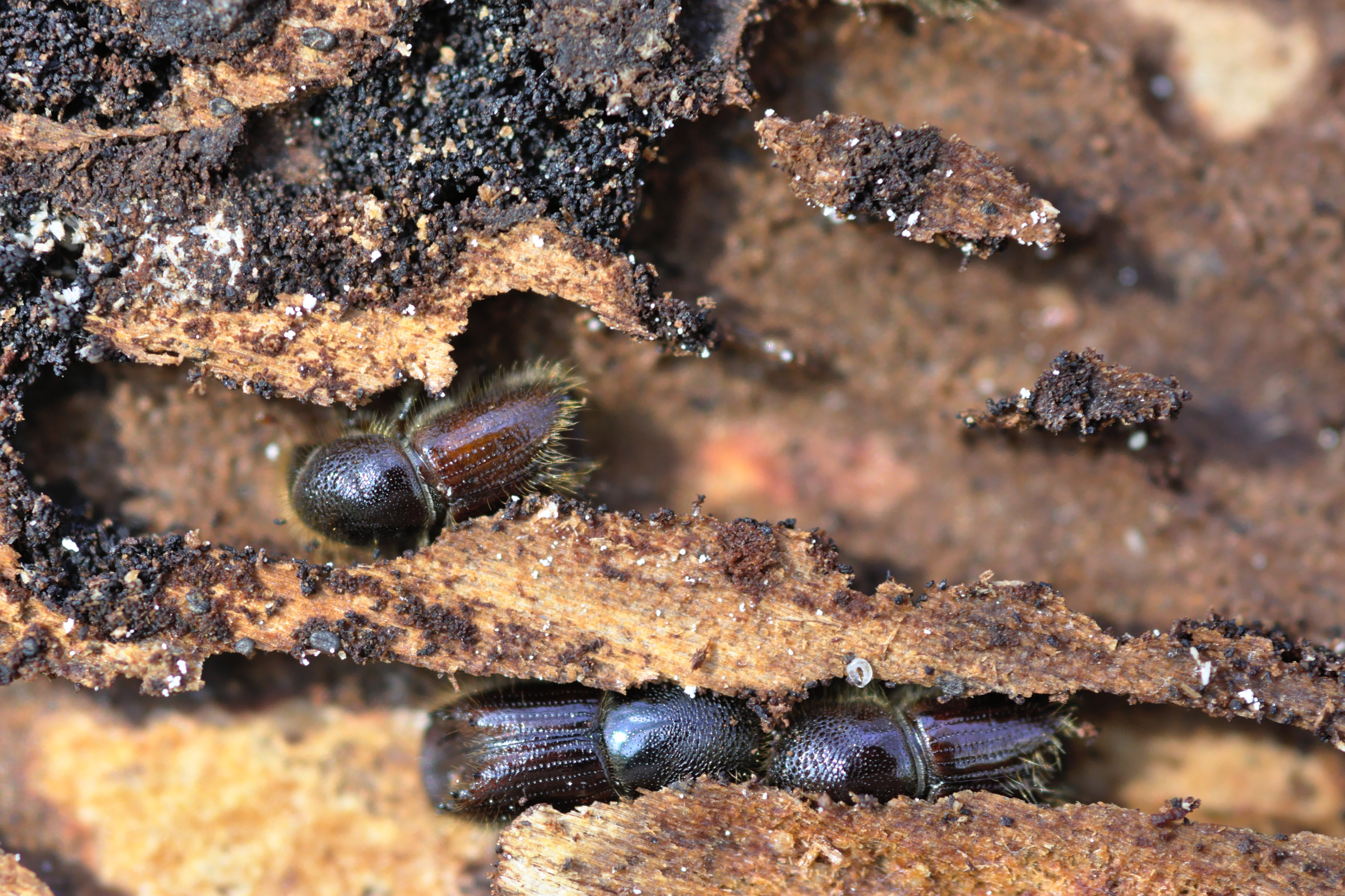
Spruce beetle galleries

In the 1940s, spruce bark beetle populations began to rise in the area of the Fraser Plateau. This killed many trees that were unable to be salvaged, and may have informed the decision to clearcut the future Bowron River outbreak. All known outbreaks of spruce bark beetle have accumulated in woody debris caused by logging or windthrow.

The forest composition of the region was typically interior spruce (Picea × albertiana) and spruce-balsam (Abies lasiocarpa). In October 1975, strong winds damaged many spruce trees in the Bowron River valley and caused a buildup of debris. A series of mild winters with significant snow accumulation, followed by early springs, created ideal conditions for one-year life cycle spruce beetles. An overlap with two-year life cycle spruce beetles caused a huge expansion in beetle populations.

The growing beetle population was first observed in 1979. The subsequent outbreak infested 175,000 hectares of forest, killing up to 60% of mature spruce trees.

== Harvest ==
Between 1981 and 1987 forestry licensees were allowed to harvest what would normally be allowable over a period of 25-30 years. 48,000 hectares were clearcut within the total 175,000 hectare outbreak area. An additional 3,300 hectares were burned by wildfire. The amount of wood harvested, about 15 million cubic meters, was enough to build approximately 900,000 1,200 square-foot-sized houses.

The peak of the harvest was between 1984 and 1985. 750 truckloads of wood would leave the Bowron a day to bring the timber to Prince George. Up to 10 additional logging companies were established in the area to profit from the work.

Studies since the logging have suggested that more standing dead trees should have been left in place. This would have had the benefit of preventing flooding by shading snowmelt, as well as providing habitat for local fauna.

== Restoration efforts ==
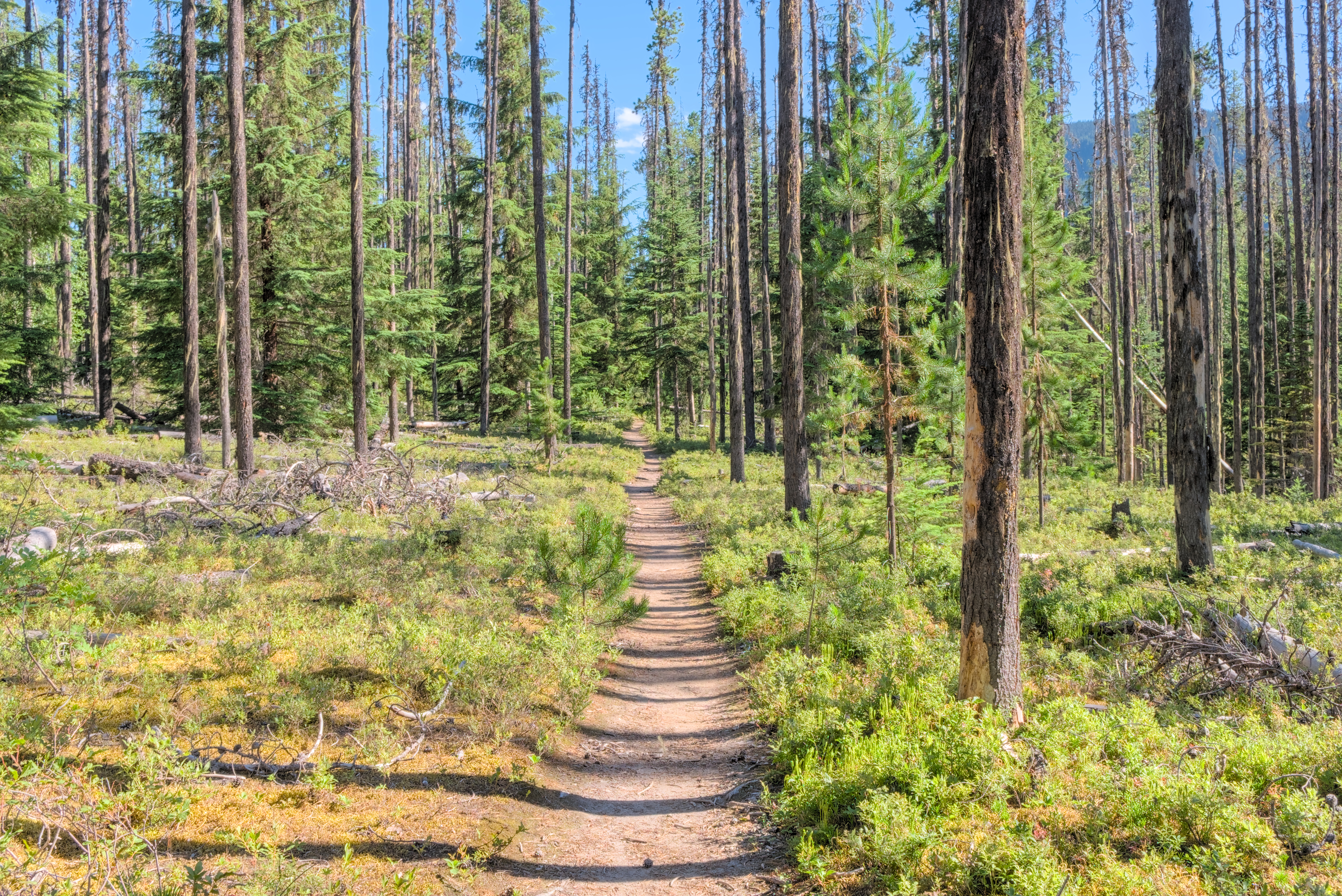
Young forest along a walking path in Bowron Lake Provincial Park, 2018

Reforestation was completed by 1999. Predominantly interior spruce (70%) and lodgepole pine (28%) were utilized. A small amount of Douglas fir (2%) was also planted. The seeds used to grow the saplings were taken from local stock.

In total, approximately 62.5 million trees were planted over 43,500 hectares. Some regions with lodgepole pine were allowed to naturally regenerate.

The Bowron clearcut has been used as a model and case study for habitat monitoring and regeneration.

== Culture ==
In his 2003 memoir Virtual Clearcut, Brian Fawcett likened the Bowron clearcut to The Epic of Gilgamesh. He stated that Humbaba had his "final apotheosis" in British Columbia. Fawcett was in correspondence with Peter Lynch about creating a documentary on the cut.

== See also ==
- Deforestation in British Columbia
