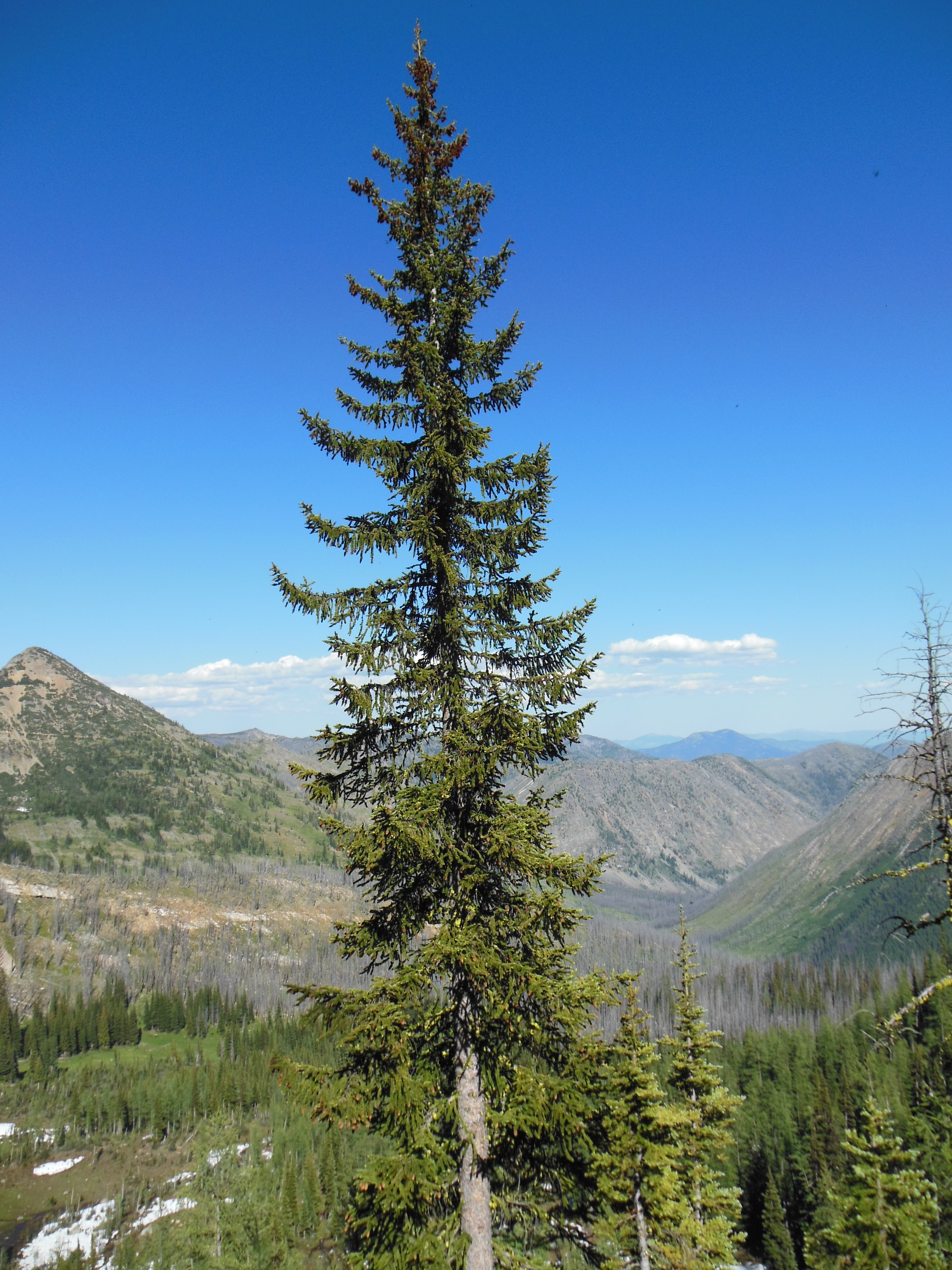
- Mature tree with female cones

Conservation status
- Least Concern (IUCN 3.1)

- Secure (NatureServe)

Scientific classification
- Kingdom: Plantae
- Clade: Tracheophytes
- Clade: Gymnosperms
- Division: Pinophyta
- Class: Pinopsida
- Order: Pinales
- Family: Pinaceae
- Genus: Picea
- Species: P. engelmannii

Binomial name
- Picea engelmannii Parry ex Engelm.
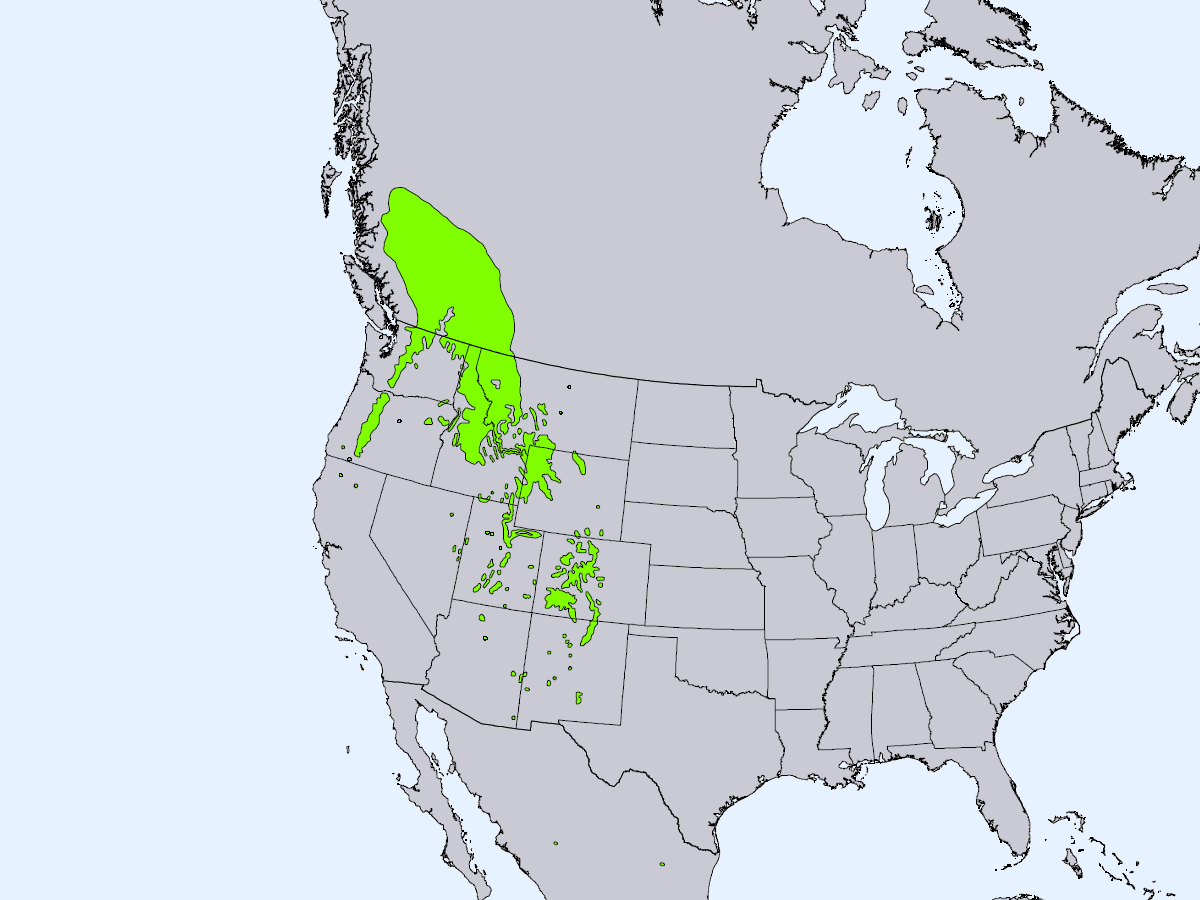

= Picea engelmannii =

Species of North American spruce tree

Picea engelmannii, with the common names Engelmann spruce, mountain spruce, and silver spruce, is a species of spruce native to western North America. It is highly prized for producing distinctive tone wood for acoustic guitars and other instruments, it is mostly a high-elevation mountain tree but also appears in watered canyons.

== Description ==
Picea engelmannii is a medium-sized to large evergreen tree growing to 25–40 metres (82–131 feet) tall, exceptionally to 65 m (213 ft) tall, and with a trunk diameter of up to 1.5 m (4 ft 11 in). The reddish bark is thin and scaly, flaking off in small circular plates 5–10 centimetres (2–4 in) across. The crown is narrow conic in young trees, becoming cylindric in older trees. The shoots are buff-brown to orange-brown, usually densely pubescent, and with prominent pulvini. The leaves are needle-like, 15–30 millimetres (5/8–1 1/8 in) long, flexible, rhombic in cross-section, glaucous blue-green above with several thin lines of stomata, and blue-white below with two broad bands of stomata. The needles have a pungent odour when crushed.

Purple cones of about 1 cm (0.39 in) appear in spring, releasing yellow pollen when windy. The cones are pendulous, slender cylindrical, 2.5–8 cm (0.98–3.15 in) long and 1.5 cm (0.59 in) broad when closed, opening to 3 cm (1.2 in) broad. They have thin, flexible scales 1.5–2 cm (0.59–0.79 in) long, with a wavy margin. They are reddish to dark purple, maturing to light brown 4–7 months after pollination. The seeds are black, 2–3 mm (0.079–0.118 in) long, with a slender, 5–8 mm (0.20–0.31 in) long light brown wing.

The tree grows in a krummholz form along the fringe of alpine tundras.

== Distribution ==
Engelmann spruce is mostly a higher-elevation mountain tree, in many areas reaching the tree line, but at lower elevations occupies cool watered canyons. It grows from 520–3,650 m (1,710–11,980 ft) above sea level, rarely lower towards the northwest.

Engelmann spruce is native to western North America, common in the Rocky Mountains and east slopes of the Cascade Range from central British Columbia to Southern Oregon in the Cascades and Montana, Idaho, and Colorado, and more sparsely towards Arizona and New Mexico in the Sky islands; there are also two isolated populations in Northern Mexico.

It appears in the canyons of the Idaho Panhandle and more limitedly in the northeastern Olympic Mountains, which features some exceptionally large specimens, including one 2.1 m (7 ft) in diameter and 55 m (179 ft) tall. It can be found in the Cascade Range, mostly on the eastern slopes, from elevations of 900–1,800 m (3,000–5,900 ft) and liberally in the Rocky Mountains. It can also be found in the Monashee and Selkirk Mountains, as well as the highlands surrounding the Interior Plateau.

== Ecology ==
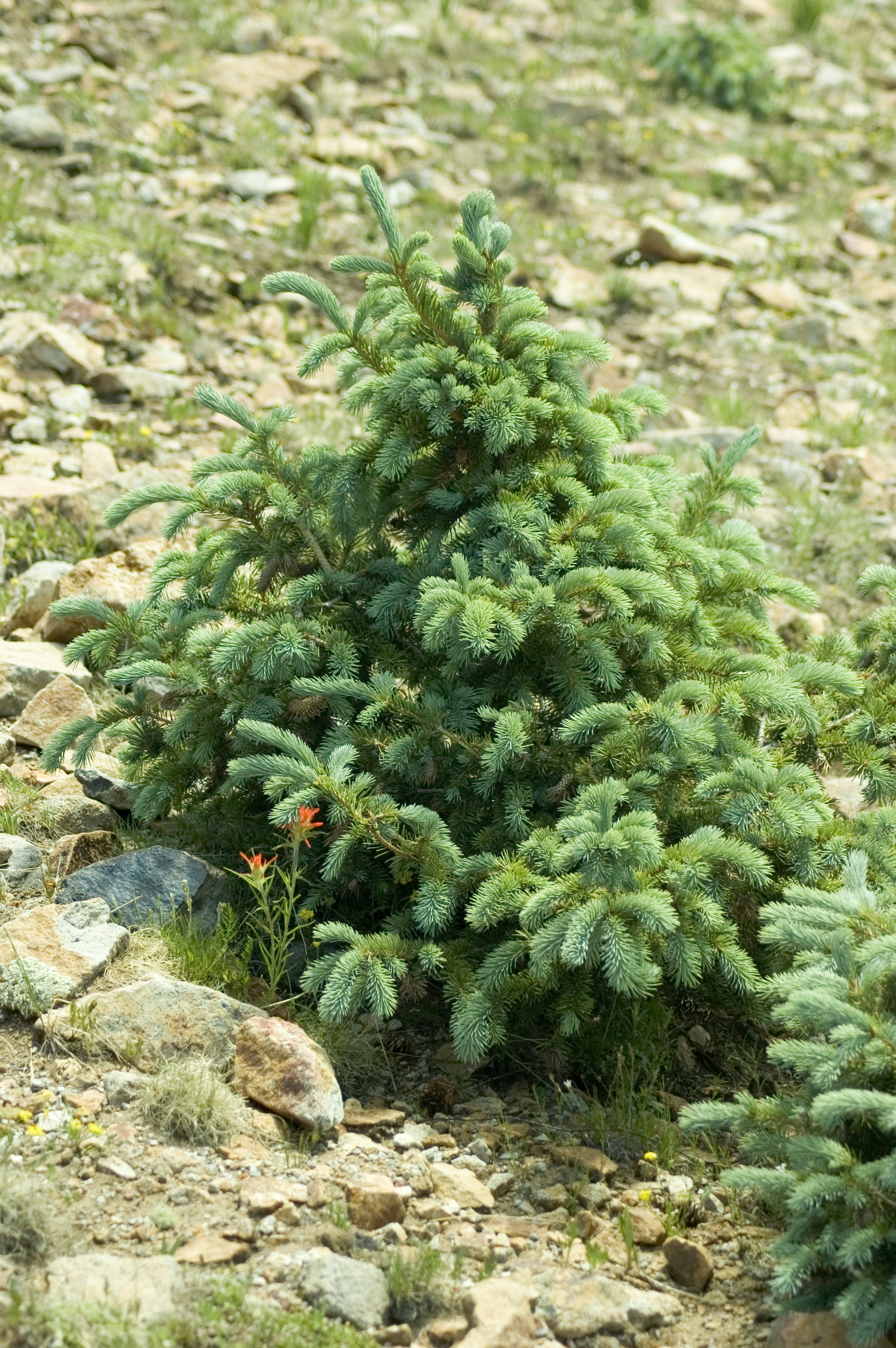
Young Engelmann Spruce seedling

Because transpiration is greatly reduced in small saplings while engulfed in snowpack, increased rates of transpiration in response to loss of snowpack, coupled with low sapwood water reserves and an extended period of soil frost in windswept areas, may prevent Engelmann spruce from regenerating in open areas both above and below the tree line. Both water uptake and water stored in roots appear to be critical for the survival of subalpine Engelmann spruce saplings that are exposed above the snowpack in later winter to early spring.

For exposed trees, the availability of soil water may be critical in late winter, when transpirational demands increase. Cuticular damage by windblown ice is probably more important at the tree line, but damage caused by desiccation is likely to be more important at lower elevations.

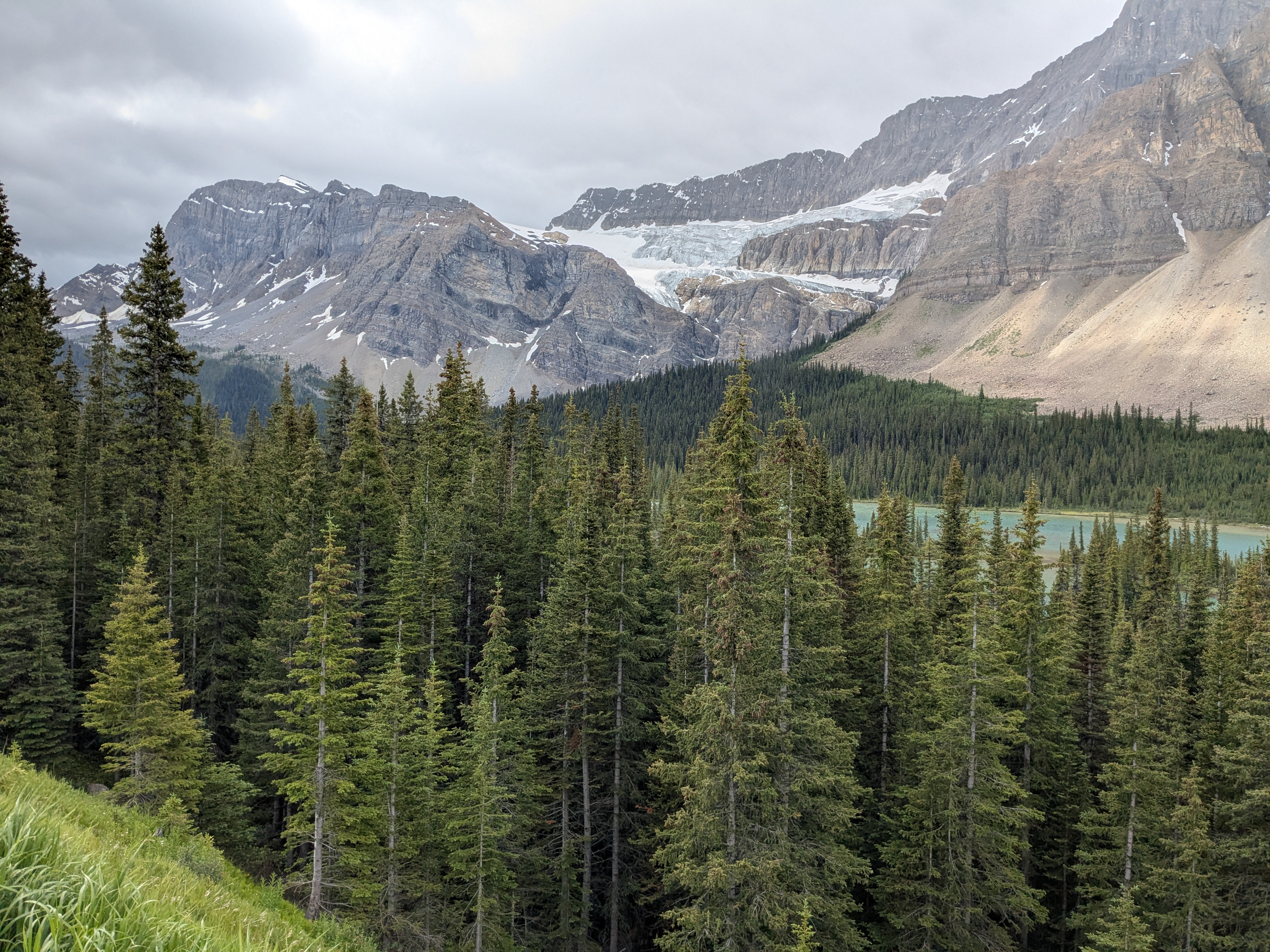
Forest of Engelmann Spruce off the Icefields Parkway

Despite wind damage, the species tends to grow taller than others at the tree line. It is shade tolerant, but not so much as subalpine fir, rendering it somewhat dependent on fires to outgrow competitors, although its thin bark and shallow roots make it vulnerable to fire. Spruce bark beetles attack the tree, being particularly deadly to groups which have stood for centuries. It is also susceptible to avalanches.

Although older spruce forests are not very useful to animals for forage, they can become so after fires, as they often burn completely, allowing many other plants, especially deciduous, to rise. Engelmann spruce-shaded streams are exploited by trout, and aphids produce galls which hang from the tree and look similar to cones when they dry out.

== Subspecies and hybrids ==
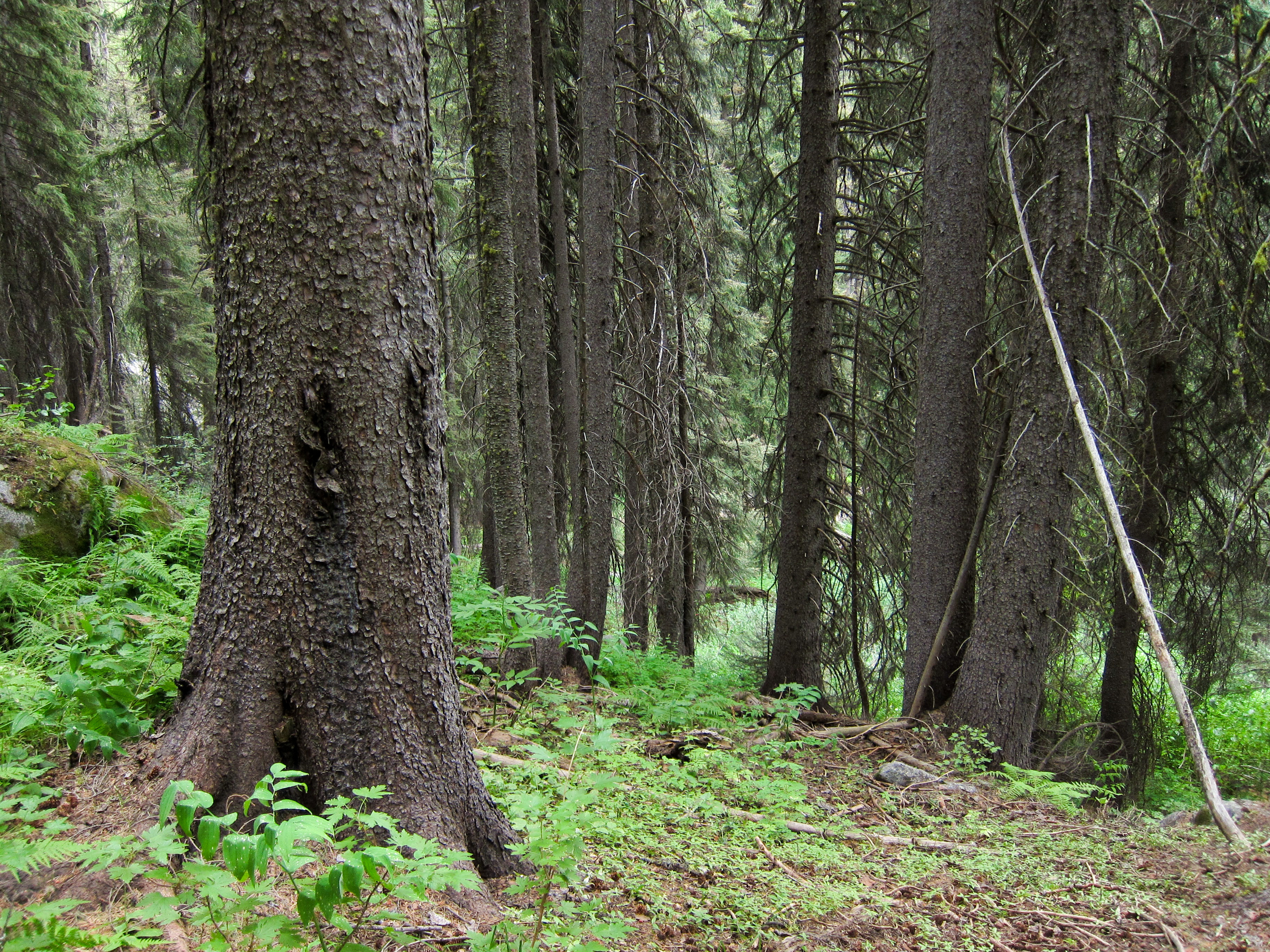
Forest floor under Engelmann spruces

Two geographical subspecies (treated as varieties by some authors, and as distinct species by others) are accepted:

- Picea engelmannii subsp. engelmannii (Engelmann spruce). All of the range except as below.
- Picea engelmannii subsp. mexicana (Mexican spruce). Two isolated populations on high mountains in northern Mexico, on the Sierra del Carmen in Coahuila (Sierra Madre Oriental) and on Cerro Mohinora in Chihuahua (Sierra Madre Occidental). Engelmann spruces of the Madrean sky islands mountains in the extreme southeast of Arizona and southwest of New Mexico also probably belong to this subspecies, though this is disputed.

The Engelmann spruce hybridises and intergrades extensively with the closely related white spruce (forming a species complex known as Picea × albertiana; Alberta spruce, or interior spruce) in interior Canada, and to a lesser extent with the closely related Sitka spruce where they meet on the western fringes of the Cascades.

== Uses ==
Native Americans made various medicines from the resin and foliage.

Engelmann spruce is of economic importance for its wood, being light and fairly strong. It is harvested for paper-making and general construction. Wood from slow-grown trees at high elevation is especially prized for making soundboards for musical instruments such as acoustic guitars, harps, violins, and pianos.

Because it is odourless and has little resin, it has been used for food containers such as barrels. It is also used to a small extent as a Christmas tree.

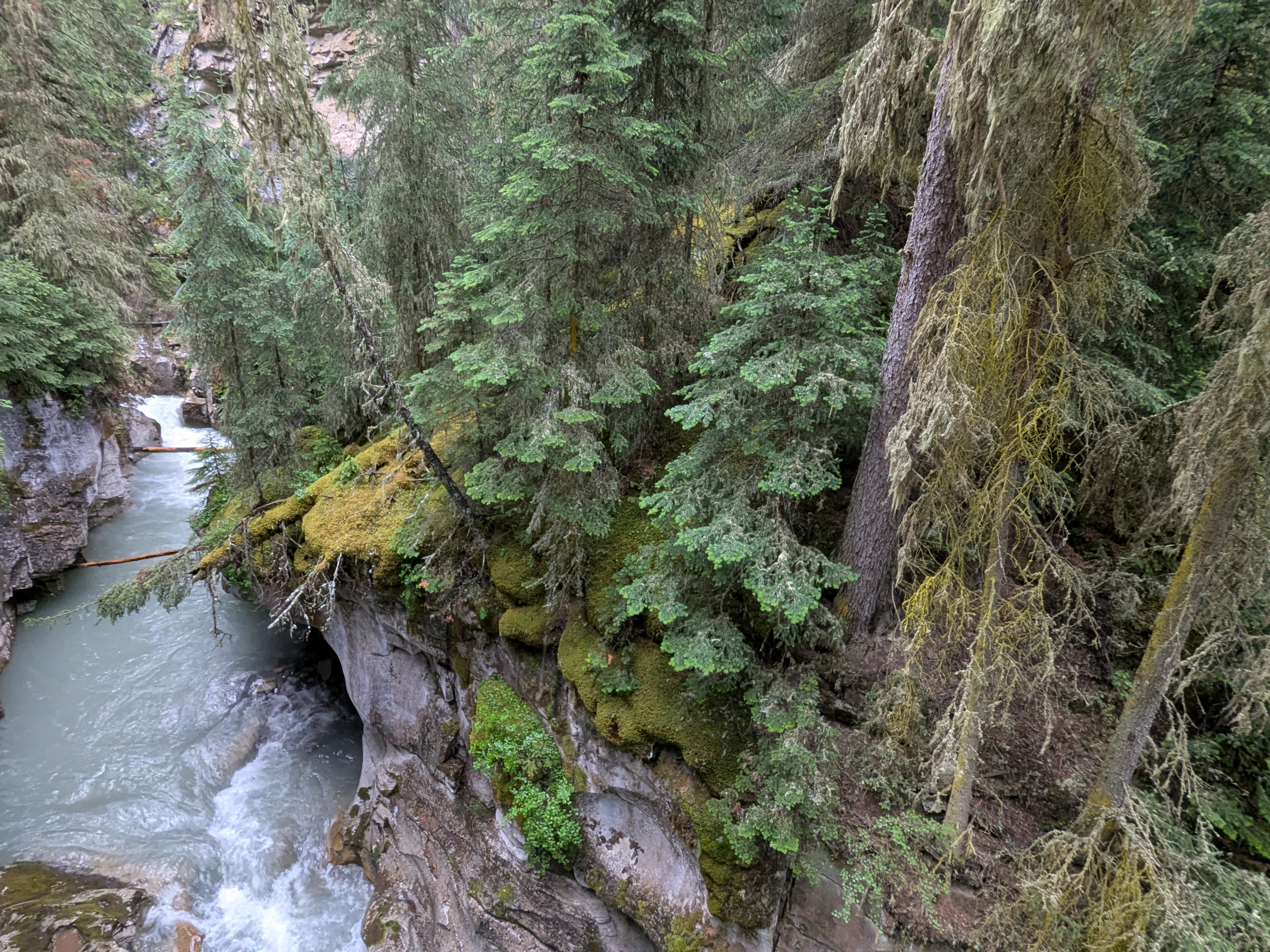
Engelmann Spruce in Johnston Canyon, Banff National Park

== Gallery ==
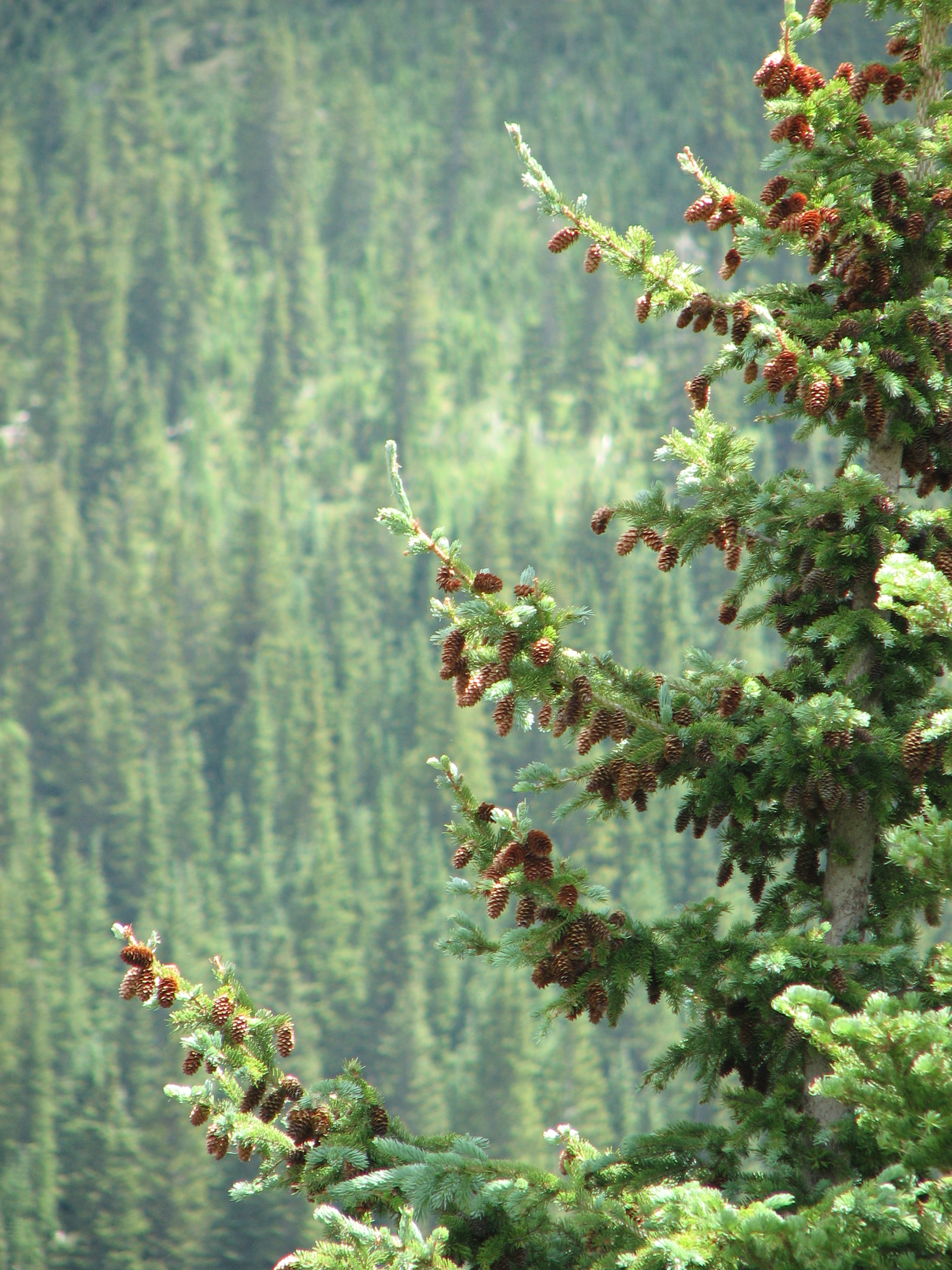
Forest, with mature female cones in foreground

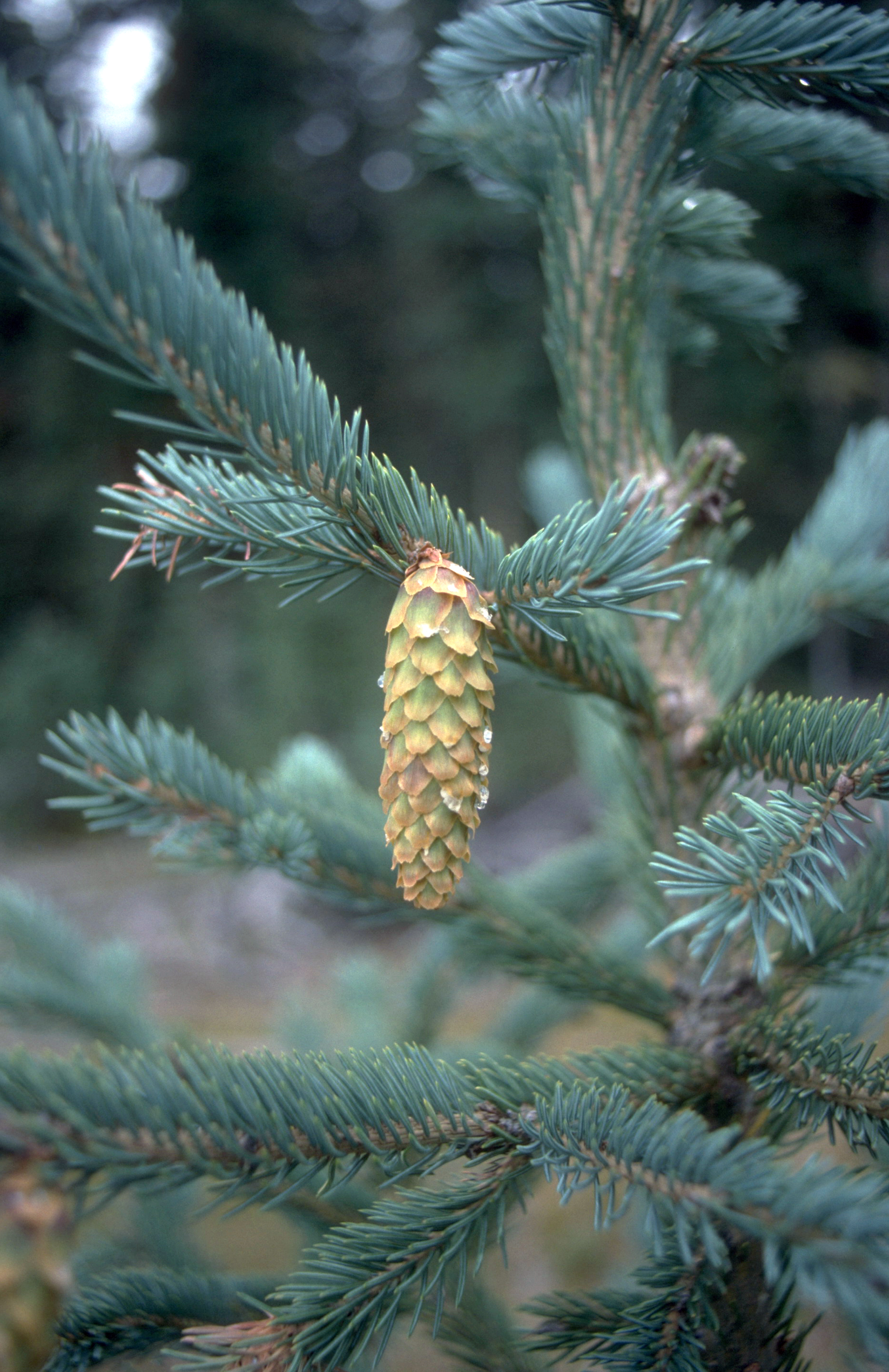
Dangling somewhat immature (unopened) female cone

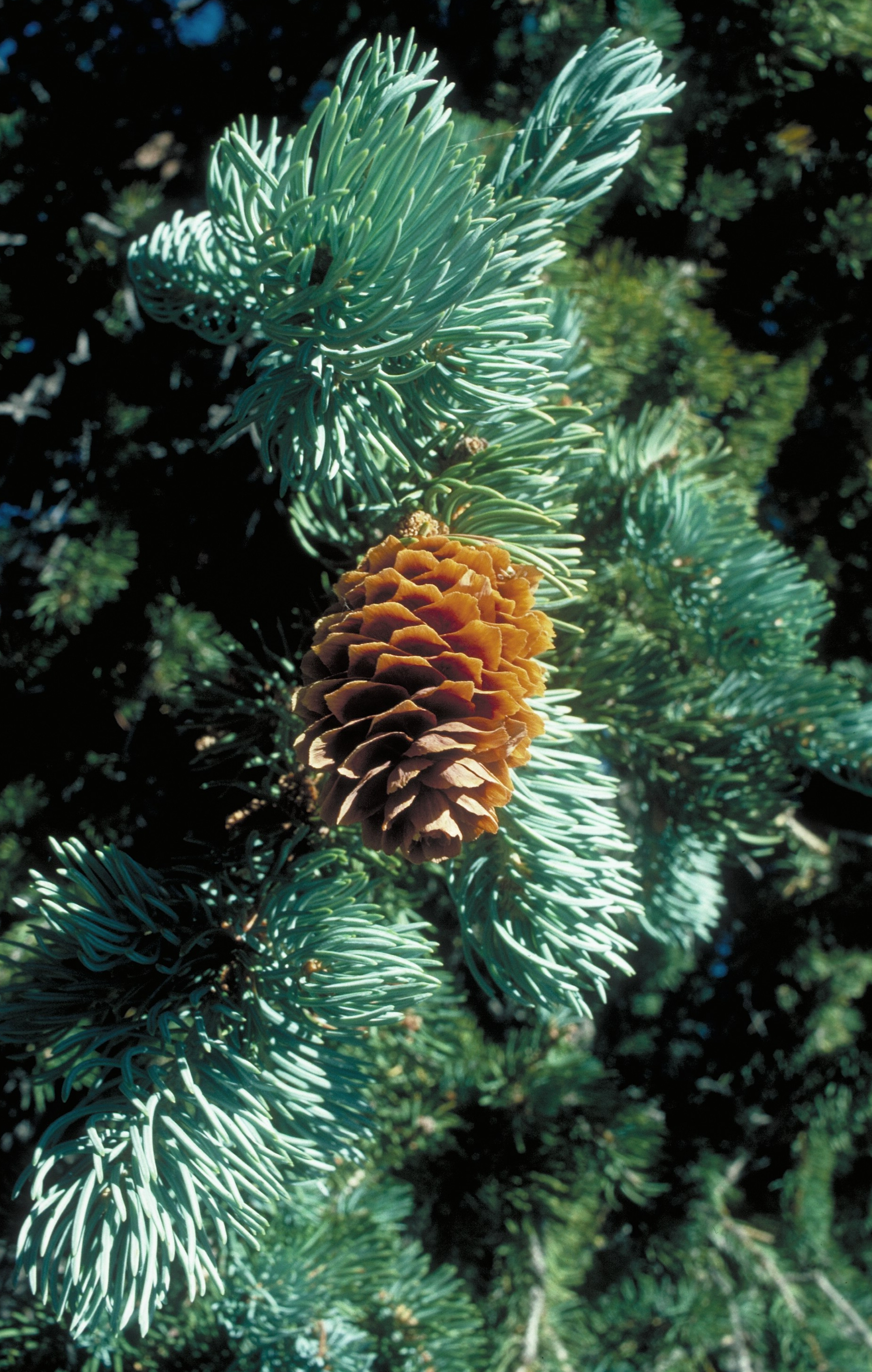
Dangling mature female cone

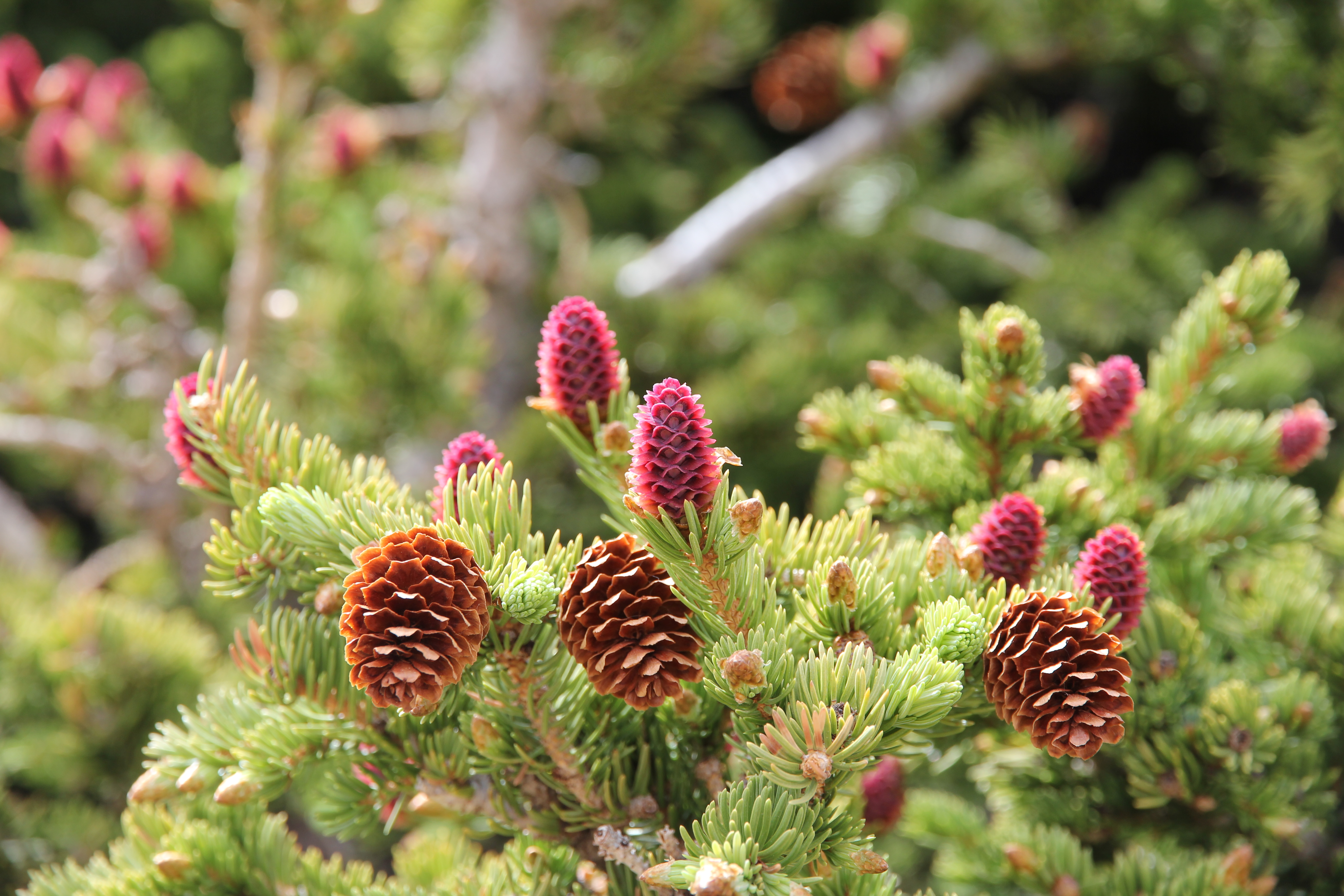
Purple immature cones and yellow mature cones from the previous year. No male pollen cones are visible; the brownish-golden branch tips are protective bud scales being shed from the spruce buds
