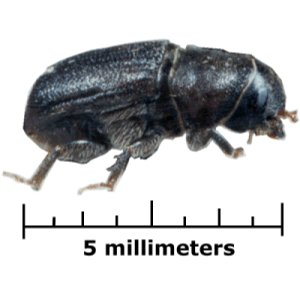
- Adult

Scientific classification
- Kingdom: Animalia
- Phylum: Arthropoda
- Clade: Pancrustacea
- Class: Insecta
- Order: Coleoptera
- Suborder: Polyphaga
- Infraorder: Cucujiformia
- Superfamily: Curculionoidea
- Family: Curculionidae
- Subfamily: Scolytinae
- Genus: Dendroctonus
- Species: D. ponderosae

Binomial name
- Dendroctonus ponderosae (Hopkins, 1902)

= Mountain pine beetle =

Species of beetle

The mountain pine beetle (Dendroctonus ponderosae) is a species of bark beetle native to the forests of western North America from Mexico to central British Columbia. It has a hard black exoskeleton, and measures approximately 5 millimetres (1/4 in), about the size of a grain of rice.

In western North America, an outbreak of the beetle and its microbial associates affected wide areas of lodgepole pine forest, including more than 160,000 km^{2} (40 million acres) of forest in British Columbia. The outbreak in the Rocky Mountain National Park in Colorado began in 1996 and has caused the destruction of millions of acres/hectares of ponderosa and lodgepole pine trees. At the peak of the outbreak in 2009, over 16,000 km^{2} (4.0 million acres) were affected. The outbreak then declined due to better environmental conditions, but many vulnerable trees had already been destroyed.

Mountain pine beetles inhabit ponderosa, whitebark, lodgepole, Scots, jack, limber, Rocky Mountain bristlecone, and Great Basin bristlecone pine trees. Normally, these insects play an important role in the life of a forest, attacking old or weakened trees, and speeding development of a younger forest. However, unusually hot, dry summers and mild winters in 2004–2007 throughout the United States and Canada, along with forests filled with mature lodgepole pine, led to an unprecedented epidemic.

The outbreak may have been the largest forest insect blight seen in North America since European colonization. Monocultural replanting, and a century of forest fire suppression have contributed to the size and severity of the outbreak, and the outbreak itself may, with similar infestations, have significant effects on the capability of northern forests to remove greenhouse gases (such as CO_{2}) from the atmosphere.

Because of its impact on forestry, the transcriptome and the genome of the beetle have been sequenced. It was the second beetle genome to be sequenced.

== Life cycle ==
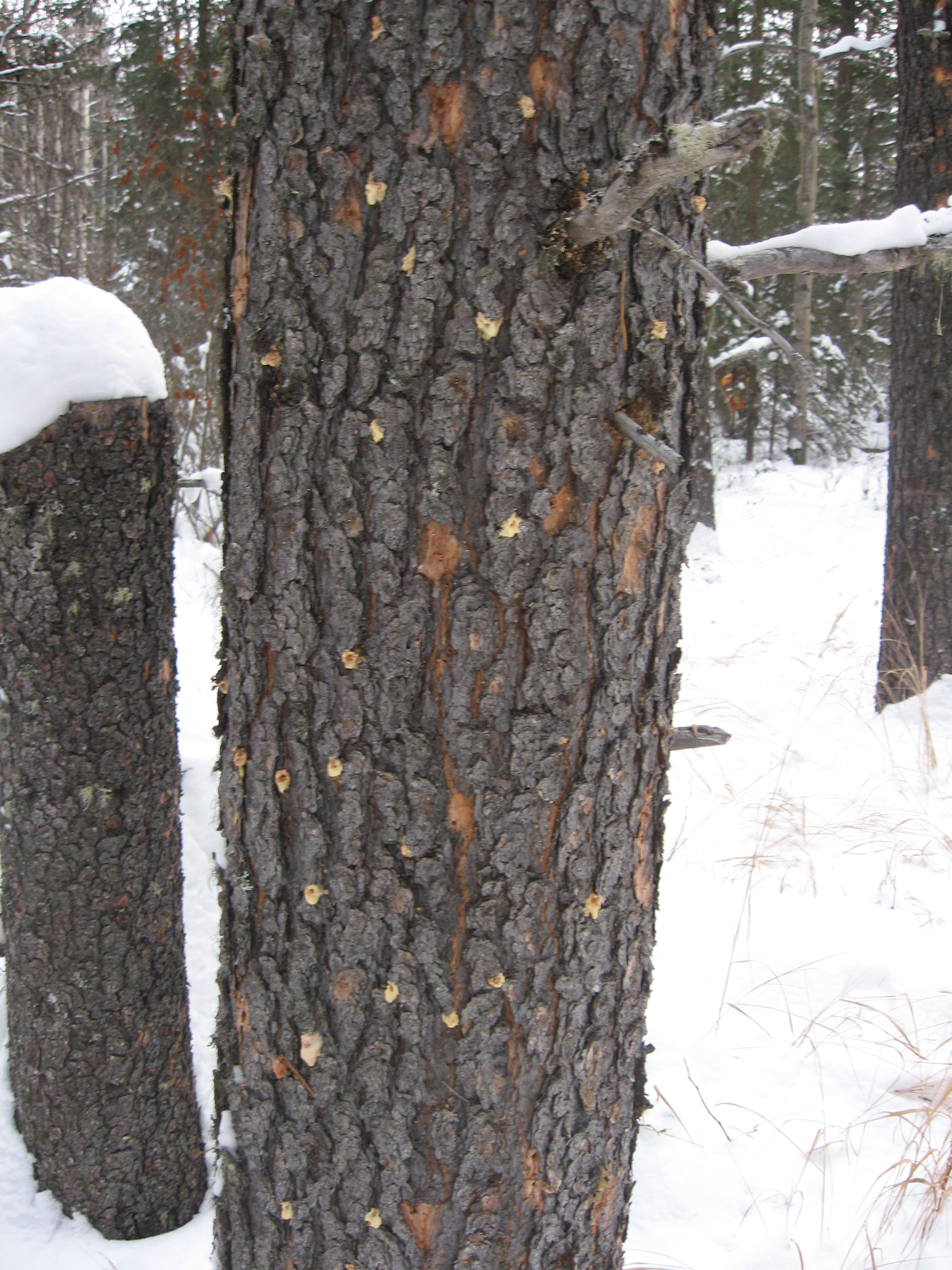
A lodgepole pine tree infested by the mountain pine beetle, with visible pitch tubes

Beetles develop through four stages: egg, larva, pupa and adult. Except for a few days during the summer when adults emerge from brood trees and fly to attack new host trees, all life stages are spent beneath the bark.

In low elevation stands and in warm years, mountain pine beetles require one year to complete a generation. At high elevations, where summers are typically cooler, life cycles may vary from one to two years.

Female beetles initiate attacks. As they chew into the inner bark and phloem, pheromones are released, attracting male and female beetles to the same tree. The attacking beetles produce more pheromones, resulting in a mass attack that overcomes the tree's defenses, and results in attacks on adjacent trees.

Natural predators of the mountain pine beetle include certain birds, particularly woodpeckers, and various insects.

== Tree infestations ==
=== Effects ===
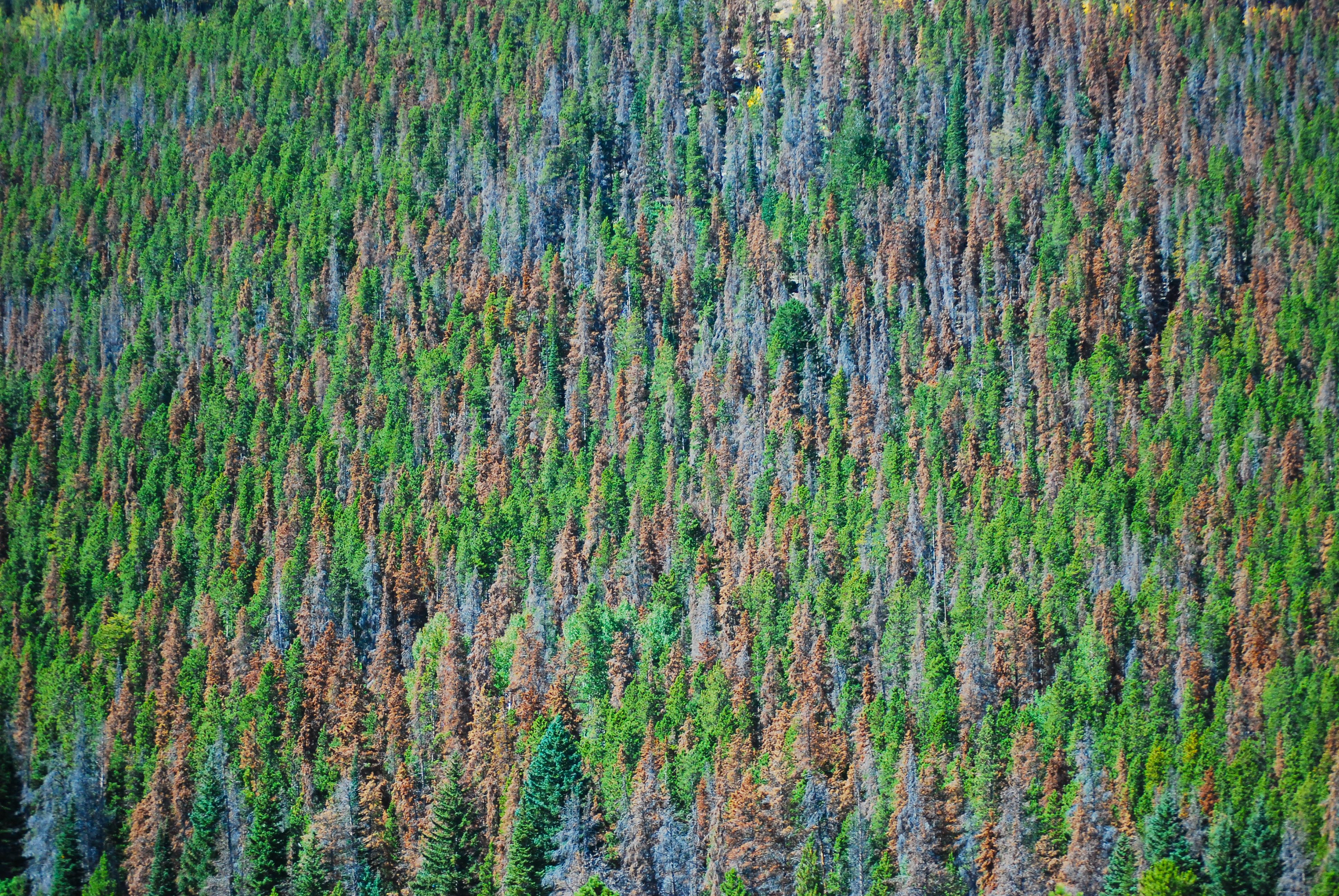
Trees damaged by mountain pine beetles in Yellowstone National Park

Mountain pine beetles can damage whole regions of forest.

Mountain pine beetles affect pine trees by laying eggs under the bark. The beetles introduce blue stain fungus into the sapwood that prevents the tree from repelling and killing the attacking beetles with tree pitch flow. The fungus also blocks water and nutrient transport within the tree. On the tree exterior, this results in popcorn-shaped masses of resin, called "pitch tubes", where the beetles have entered. The joint action of larval feeding and fungal colonization kills the host tree within a few weeks of successful attack (the fungus and feeding by the larvae girdles the tree, cutting off the flow of water and nutrients). In recent years, drought conditions have further weakened trees, making them more vulnerable and unable to defend against attack. When the tree is first attacked, it remains green. Usually within a year of attack, the needles will have turned red. This means the tree is dying or dead, and the beetles have moved to another tree. Within three to four years after the attack, very little foliage is left, so the trees appear grey.

As beetle populations increase or more trees become stressed because of drought or other causes, the population may quickly increase and spread. Healthy trees are then attacked, and huge areas of mature pine stands may be threatened or killed. Warm summers and mild winters play a role in both insect survival and the continuation and intensification of an outbreak. Adverse weather conditions (such as winter lows of -40°) can reduce the beetle populations and slow the spread, but the insects can recover quickly and resume their attack on otherwise healthy forests.

=== Outbreak dynamics ===
Mountain pine beetle outbreaks begin when populations rise to cross a dynamically unstable eruption threshold, which has been estimated from field data as roughly 650 female adults per tree, or roughly one to two successfully mass-attacked trees per hectare, but varies depending on stand microclimate. The crossing of this unstable eruption threshold can occur either when local individuals from endemic populations in suppressed and damaged trees congregate to form a successful mass-attack, or when large numbers immigrate from afar. This eruption threshold lies well below the operational limits of easy detectability, which is one reason why populations are so challenging to control: early detection is critical for preventing runaway eruption. When fast-growing populations are not detected early, they exhibit exponential growth from positive feedback, and if host pine trees, which grow slowly, are distributed extensively, an extensive outbreak will result. The sudden switch from endemic to epidemic as a result of a slow-changing variable has been referred to as "slow-fast" eruption dynamics, consistent with catastrophe theory. The switching from patterned spotting on stressed trees to patternless region-wide outbreak has been termed a "hallmark of outbreak", and is considered characteristic of "cross-scale" eruption dynamics, an idea first championed by C. S. Holling in 1973. The suddenness of unexpected large-scale change - "the ecology of surprise" - is ultimately what makes mountain pine beetle outbreaks so difficult to control and to manage around.

=== Increases due to climate change ===
Climate change and the associated changing weather patterns occurring worldwide have a direct effect on biology, population ecology, and the population of eruptive insects, such as the mountain pine beetle. This is because temperature is a factor which determines insect development and population success. Mountain pine beetles are a species native to Western North America. Prior to climatic and temperature changes, the mountain pine beetle predominately lived and attacked lodgepole and ponderosa pine trees at lower elevations, as the higher elevation Rocky Mountains and Cascades were too cold for their survival. Under normal seasonal freezing weather conditions in the lower elevations, the forest ecosystems that pine beetles inhabit are kept in a balance by factors such as tree defense mechanisms, beetle defense mechanisms, and freezing temperatures. It is a simple relationship between a host (the forest), an agent (the beetle) and the environment (the weather and temperature). However, as climate change causes mountain areas to become warmer and drier, pine beetles have more power to infest and destroy the forest ecosystems, such as the whitebark pine forests of the Rocky Mountains.

Increased temperatures also allow the pine beetle to increase their life cycle by 100%: it only takes a single year instead of two for the pine beetle to develop. As the Rockies have not adapted to deal with pine beetle infestations, they lack the defenses to fight the beetles. Warmer weather patterns, drought, and beetle defense mechanisms together dries out sap in pine trees, which is the main mechanism of defense that trees have against the beetle, as it drowns the beetles and their eggs. This makes it easier for the beetle to infest and release chemicals into the tree, luring other beetles in an attempt to overcome the weakened defense system of the pine tree. As a consequence, the host (forest) becomes more vulnerable to the disease-causing agent (the beetle).

Pine forests in British Columbia have been devastated by a pine beetle infestation, which has expanded unhindered since 1998 at least in part due to the lack of severe winters since that time; a few days of extreme cold kill most mountain pine beetles and have kept outbreaks in the past naturally contained. The infestation, which (by November 2008) has killed about half of the province's lodgepole pines (33 million acres or 135,000 km^{2}) is an order of magnitude larger than any previously recorded outbreak. One reason for unprecedented host tree mortality may be due to that the mountain pine beetles have higher reproductive success in lodgepole pine trees growing in areas where the trees have not experienced frequent beetle epidemics, which includes much of the current outbreak area. In 2007 the outbreak spread, via unusually strong winds, over the continental divide to Alberta. An epidemic also started, be it at a lower rate, in 1999 in Colorado, Wyoming, and Montana. The United States forest service predicts that between 2011 and 2013 virtually all 5 million acres (20,000 km^{2}) of Colorado's lodgepole pine trees over five inches (127 mm) in diameter will be lost.

The whitebark pine forests of the Rockies are not the only forests that have been affected by the mountain pine beetle. Due to temperature changes and wind patterns, the pine beetle has now spread through the Continental Divide of the Rockies and has invaded the fragile boreal forests of Alberta.

While climate warming is exacerbating outbreaks of mountain pine beetle in northern British Columbia, the opposite is happening in Washington and Oregon, where the climate is slowly becoming too warm for the beetle.

== Management ==
Management techniques include harvesting at the leading edges of "green attack", as well as other techniques that can be used to manage infestations on a smaller scale, including:

- Pheromone baiting – is luring beetles into trees 'baited' with a synthetic hormone that mimics the scent of a female beetle. Beetles can then be contained in a single area, where they can more easily be destroyed.
- Sanitation harvesting – is removing single infested trees to control the spread of beetle populations to other areas.
- Snip and skid – is removing groups of infested trees scattered over a large area.
- Controlled, or mosaic, burning – is burning an area where infested trees are concentrated, to reduce high beetle infestations in the area or to help reduce the fire hazard in an area. Controlling wildfires has significantly increased since the 1980s and '90s due to firefighting technology.
- Fall and burn – is cutting (felling) and burning beetle-infested trees to prevent the spread of beetle populations to other areas. This is usually done in winter, to reduce the risk of starting forest fires.
- Pesticides – Biopesticides such as chitosan have been tested for protection against the mountain pine beetle, and pesticides such as carbaryl, permethrin, and bifenthrin are used for smaller area applications.

Around the turn of the millennium the US Forest Service tested chitosan, a biopesticide, to pre-arm pine trees to defend themselves against MPB. The US Forest Service results show colloidal chitosan elicited a 40% increase in pine resin (P<0.05) in southern pine trees. One milliliter chitosan per 10 gallons water was applied to the ground area within the drip ring of loblolly pine trees. The application was repeated three times from May through September in 2008. The chitosan was responsible for eliciting natural defense responses of increased resin pitch-outs, with the ability to destroy 37% of the pine beetle eggs. Dr. Jim Linden, Microbiologist, Colorado State University, stated the chitosan increased resin pitch-outs to push the mountain pine beetle out of the tree, preventing the MPB from entering the pine tree and spreading blue stain mold.

Searching out, removing, and destroying the brood in infested trees is the best way to slow the spread of mountain pine beetles; however, it may not protect specific trees. Spraying trees to prevent attack is the most effective way to protect a small number of high-value trees from mountain pine beetles. Carbaryl, permethrin and bifenthrin are registered in the United States for use in the prevention of pine beetle infestations. Carbaryl is considered by the EPA to likely be carcinogenic to humans. It is moderately toxic to wild birds and partially to highly toxic to aquatic organisms. Permethrin is easily metabolized in mammalian livers, so is less dangerous to humans. Birds are also practically not affected by permethrin. Negative effects can be seen in aquatic ecosystems, as well as it being very toxic to beneficial insects. Bifenthrin is moderately dangerous to mammals, including humans; it is slightly more toxic to birds and aquatic ecosystems than permethrin, as well as extremely toxic to beneficial insects.

In 2015 fall and burn was the technique being used in Alberta where there is hope of limiting the outbreak to western Canada, preventing its spread to northern Saskatchewan and further towards eastern Canada where jack pine may be vulnerable as far east as Nova Scotia. By 2022 the beetle population in Alberta had dropped by 94 per cent when compared to its peak in 2019, according to the Alberta Forestry service.

== Effects ==
=== Fire hazard ===
While weather and drought are important drivers of wildfires in sub boreal forests, bottom-up drivers of elevation and vegetation, including the fuel legacies of bark beetle outbreaks, are crucial factors influencing high-severity burning. The outbreak of mountain pine beetles in the early 2010s, ten times larger than previous outbreaks, created dead pine stands representing a potential fire hazard, prompting the BC government to direct fuel management activities in beetle areas as recommended in the 2003 Firestorm Provincial Review. Huge swaths of central British Columbia (BC) and parts of Alberta have been hit badly, with over 40 million acres (160,000 km^{2}) of BC's forests affected.

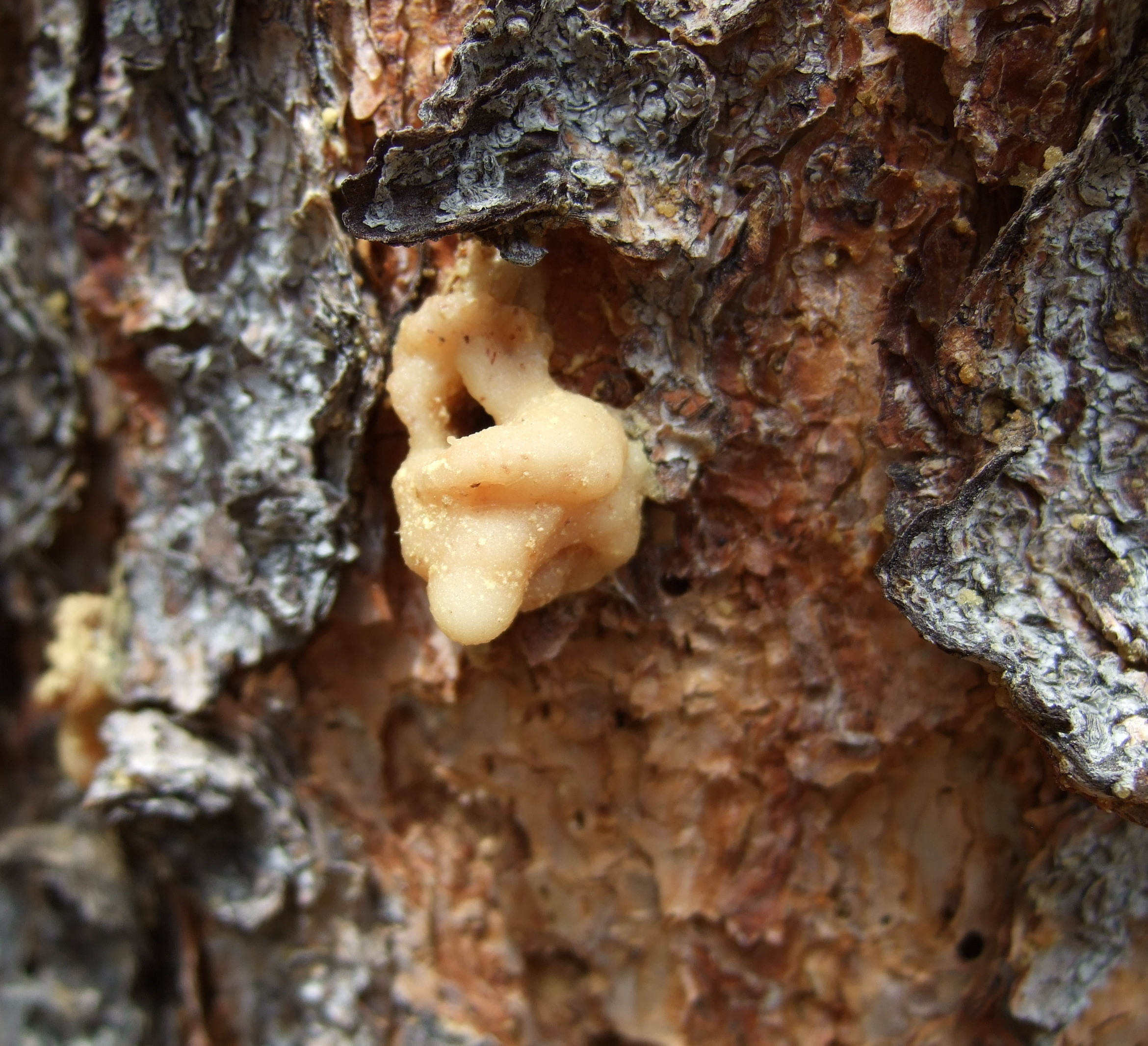
A lodgepole pine tree with a pitch tube

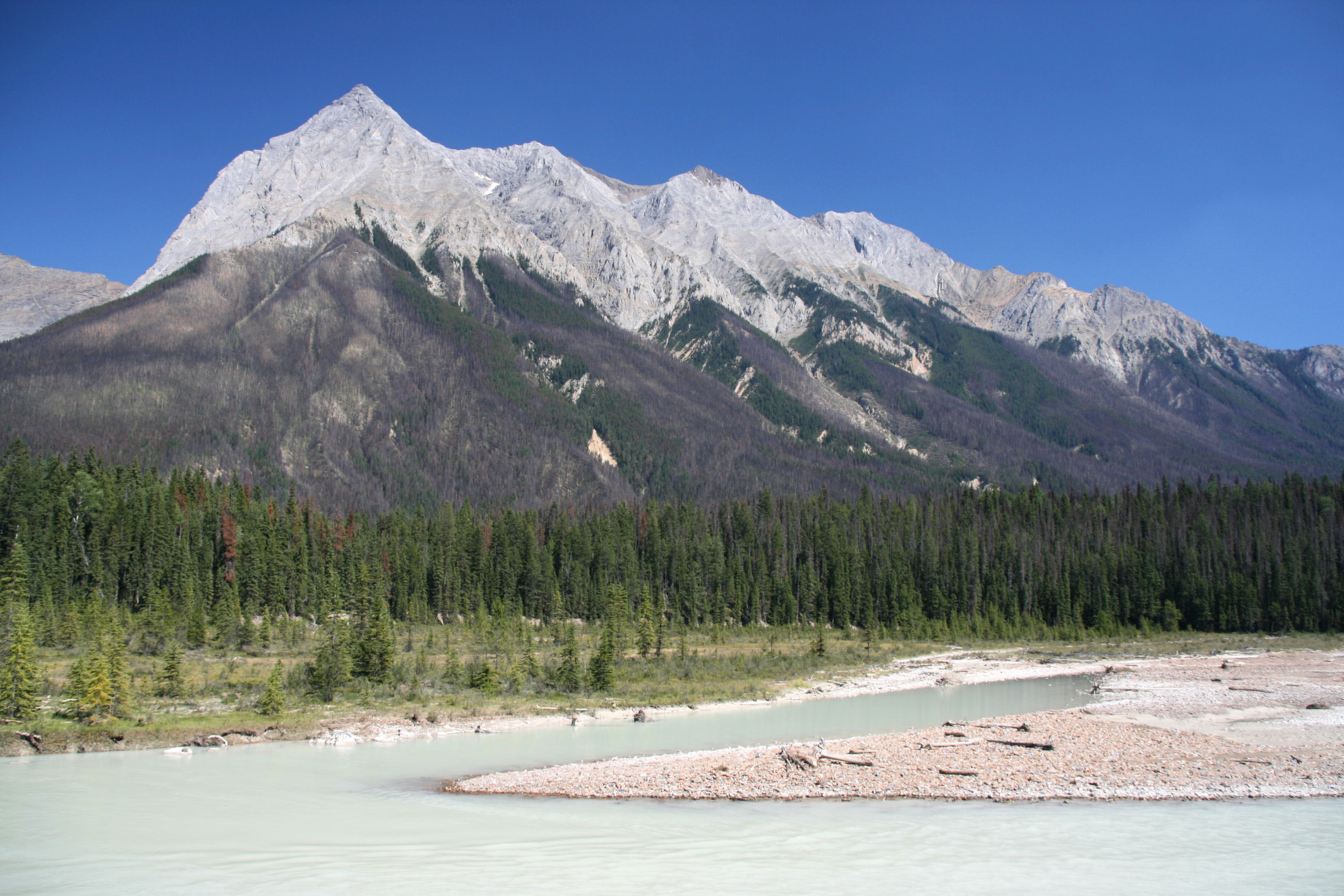
Invaded pine tree forest on the slopes of Chancellor Peak in Yoho National Park, Canada

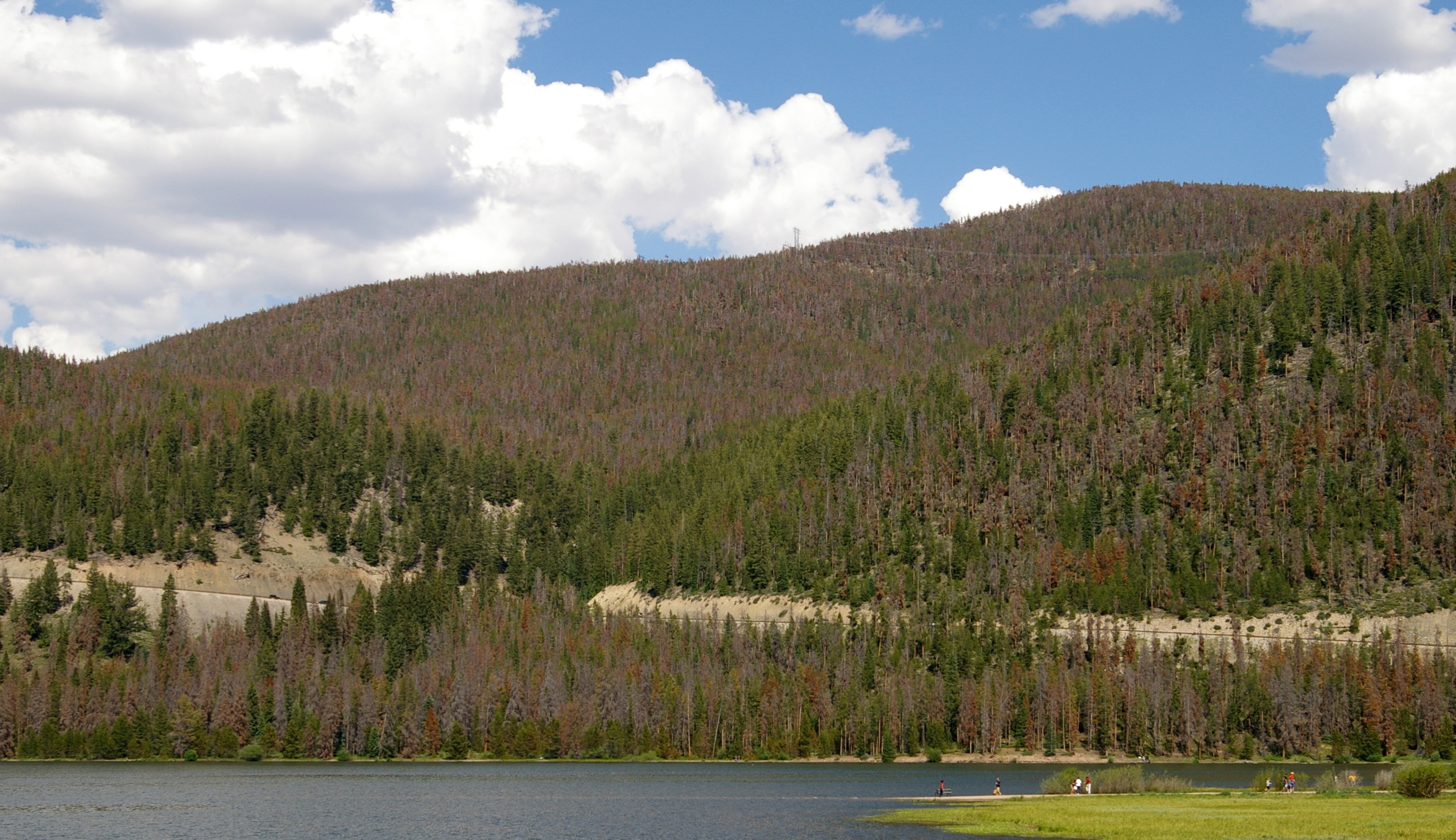
A pine tree forest north of Breckenridge, CO shows infestation in 2008.

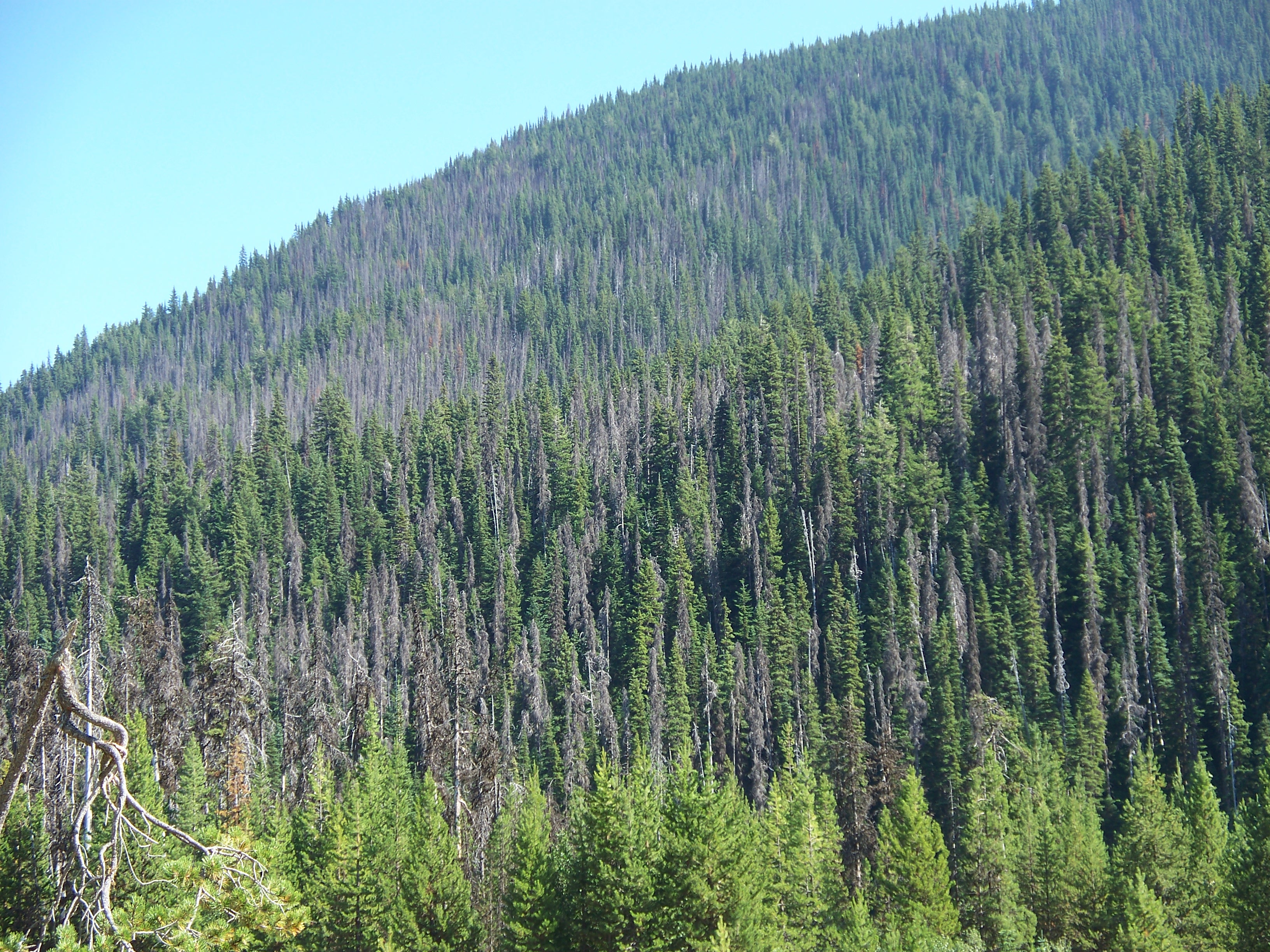
Pine beetle damage in E. C. Manning Provincial Park, British Columbia, Canada, as of August 2010

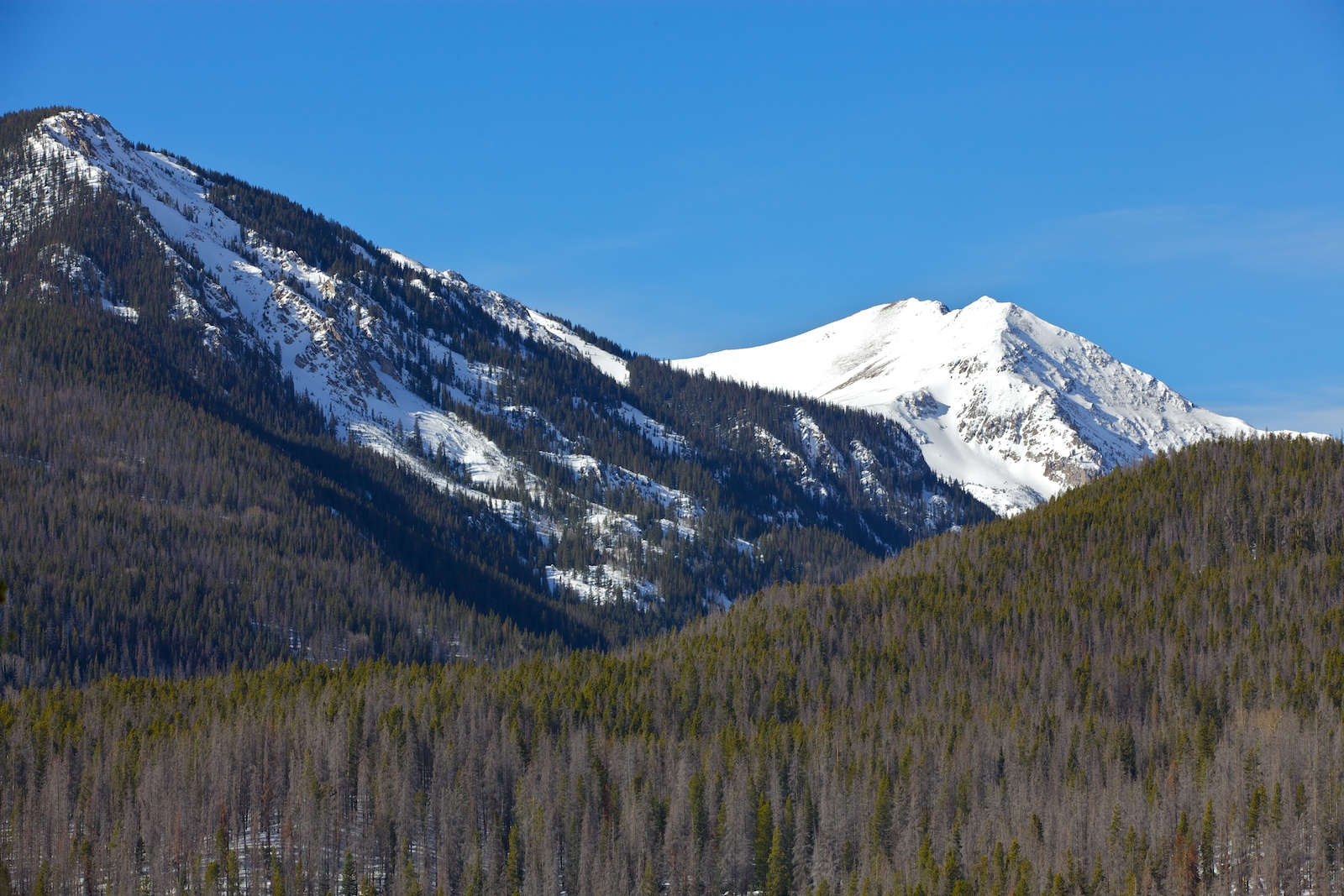
Mountain pine beetle damage in Rocky Mountain National Park as of January 2012

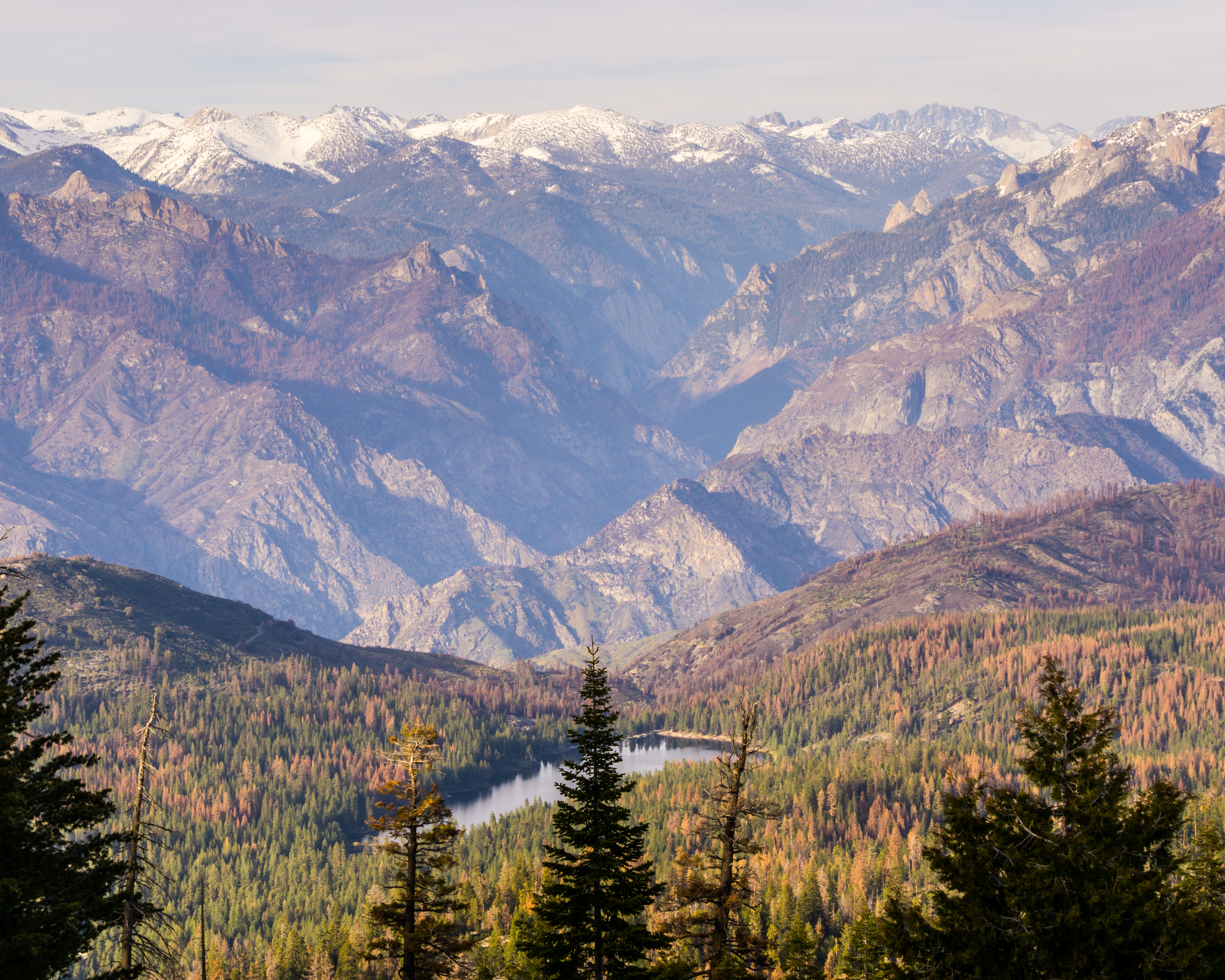
Mountain pine beetle damage at Hume Lake, California as of April 2016

Previously, cold spells had killed off bark beetles, but with warmer weather they attacked the forests. The longer breeding season is another factor encouraging beetle proliferation. The combination of warmer weather, attack by beetles, and mismanagement during past years has led to a substantial increase in the severity of forest fires in Montana. According to a study done for the U.S. Environmental Protection Agency by the Harvard School of Engineering and Applied Science, portions of Montana will experience a 200% increase in area burned by wildland fires, and an 80% increase in air pollution from those fires.

=== On the carbon cycle ===
Researchers from the Canadian Forest Service have studied the relationship between the carbon cycle and forest fires, logging and tree deaths. They concluded by 2020, the pine beetle outbreak will have released 270 megatonnes of carbon dioxide into the atmosphere from Canadian forests. There is yet to be an accepted study of the carbon cycle effect over a future period of time for North American forests, but scientists believe we are at a "tipping point" of our Western Forests becoming a source of carbon off-put that is greater than that of a "carbon sink". Other scientists say that this "tipping point" will reverse itself as new forest life is established. This new growth will remove more carbon dioxide than the mature trees they are replacing would have. According to a 2016 study from the Pacific Institute for Climate Solutions rising levels of carbon dioxide may cancel out the pine beetle impact in British Columbia by 2020. The fertilization effect of the increased CO_{2} levels has returned BC forests to a carbon sink as of 2016 per Werner Kurz of the Canadian Forest Service.

=== On water resources ===
Hydrologists from the University of Colorado have investigated the impacts of beetle-infested forests on the water cycle, in particular, snow accumulation and melt. They concluded that dead forests will accumulate more snowpack as a result of thinner tree canopies and decreased snow sublimation. These thinned canopies also cause faster snowmelt by allowing more sunlight through to the forest floor and lowering the snowpack albedo, as a result of needle litter on the snow surface. Augmented snowpack coupled with dead trees that no longer transpire will likely lead to more available water.

== In human culture ==
In Custer, South Dakota, a giant effigy of a mountain pine beetle is set on fire each January as a part of its annual Burning Beetle celebration. The celebration began as an artistic response to environmental change caused by mountain pine beetle infestations in the Black Hills.

== See also ==
- Beetle kill in Colorado
- Rocky Mountain bark beetle infestation
- Biopesticide
- Chitosan
- Global warming
- United States Forest Service
