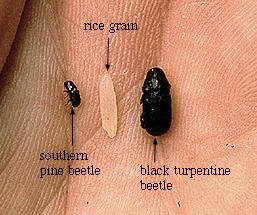

Scientific classification
- Kingdom: Animalia
- Phylum: Arthropoda
- Clade: Pancrustacea
- Class: Insecta
- Order: Coleoptera
- Suborder: Polyphaga
- Infraorder: Cucujiformia
- Superfamily: Curculionoidea
- Family: Curculionidae
- Genus: Dendroctonus
- Species: D. terebrans

Binomial name
- Dendroctonus terebrans (Olivier, 1795)

= Dendroctonus terebrans =

Species of beetle

Dendroctonus terebrans, the black turpentine beetle, is a species of bark beetle native to the eastern United States. Its larvae tunnel under the bark of pine trees, weakening and sometimes killing the trees.

== Description ==
This is the largest bark beetle in the southeastern United States, with an adult length of 5 to 8 mm (0.2 to 0.3 in). It is cylindrical, dark reddish-brown or black. The prothorax is narrower at the front than at the back and does not completely cover the head. The antennae are club-shaped, the front of the head is convex, and the tip of the abdomen is rounded. The larvae are creamy-white with orange-brown heads, and have no legs. When fully developed they are about 12 mm (0.5 in) in length.

== Distribution ==
Dendroctonus terebrans is native to eastern United States where it attacks both native pines and exotic pine species. Its range extends from New Hampshire southwards through the coastal plain to Florida and westward to Texas and Missouri. The red turpentine beetle (Dendroctonus valens) has a much wider distribution in the eastern United States, and the ranges of the two species overlap very little.

== Life cycle ==
This beetle is strongly attracted to volatile chemicals produced by freshly cut pine stumps, and it will infest these as well as intact trees, in particular selecting trees that are stressed. The trees are often simultaneously attacked by certain species of engraver beetles (Ips spp.) and the southern pine beetle (Dendroctonus frontalis).

Dendroctonus terebrans attacks pine trees near the base. A female beetle tunnels into the bark and has to overcome the resin exuded by the tree as a defence. This oozing resin mixes with the wood dust and forms a pinkish "pitch tube" on the bark at the site of entry. If she successfully gains entry into the sapwood, the female spends about a fortnight excavating a gallery which typically is at first horizontal and then goes vertically downwards, often to below ground level. Here she is joined by a male and lays about a hundred eggs at one side of the gallery. The eggs hatch after ten to fourteen days and the larvae fan out, chewing their way side by side through the surface layers of the sapwood, creating a gallery packed full with the frass they produce. This gallery resembles that formed by the red turpentine beetle and the Mexican bark beetle (Dendroctonus rhizophagus), which both feed on pine, and the great spruce bark beetle (Dendroctonus micans), which feeds on spruce.

When they have completed their development, the larvae tunnel away from each other individually and create pupation chambers in which they pupate. When the adult insects emerge, they drill their way to the surface and disperse. In Florida, breeding takes place at any time of year, and there may be three overlapping generations. The beetle can act as a vector for the blue stain fungus, carrying it from one tree to another. A European predatory beetle, Rhizophagus grandis, that normally preys on the related great spruce bark beetle, has been found experimentally to be attracted to the frass produced by the black turpentine beetle larvae. Biological control using this predator is being investigated, with a batch of beetles imported from Belgium being released in Louisiana in 1988.
