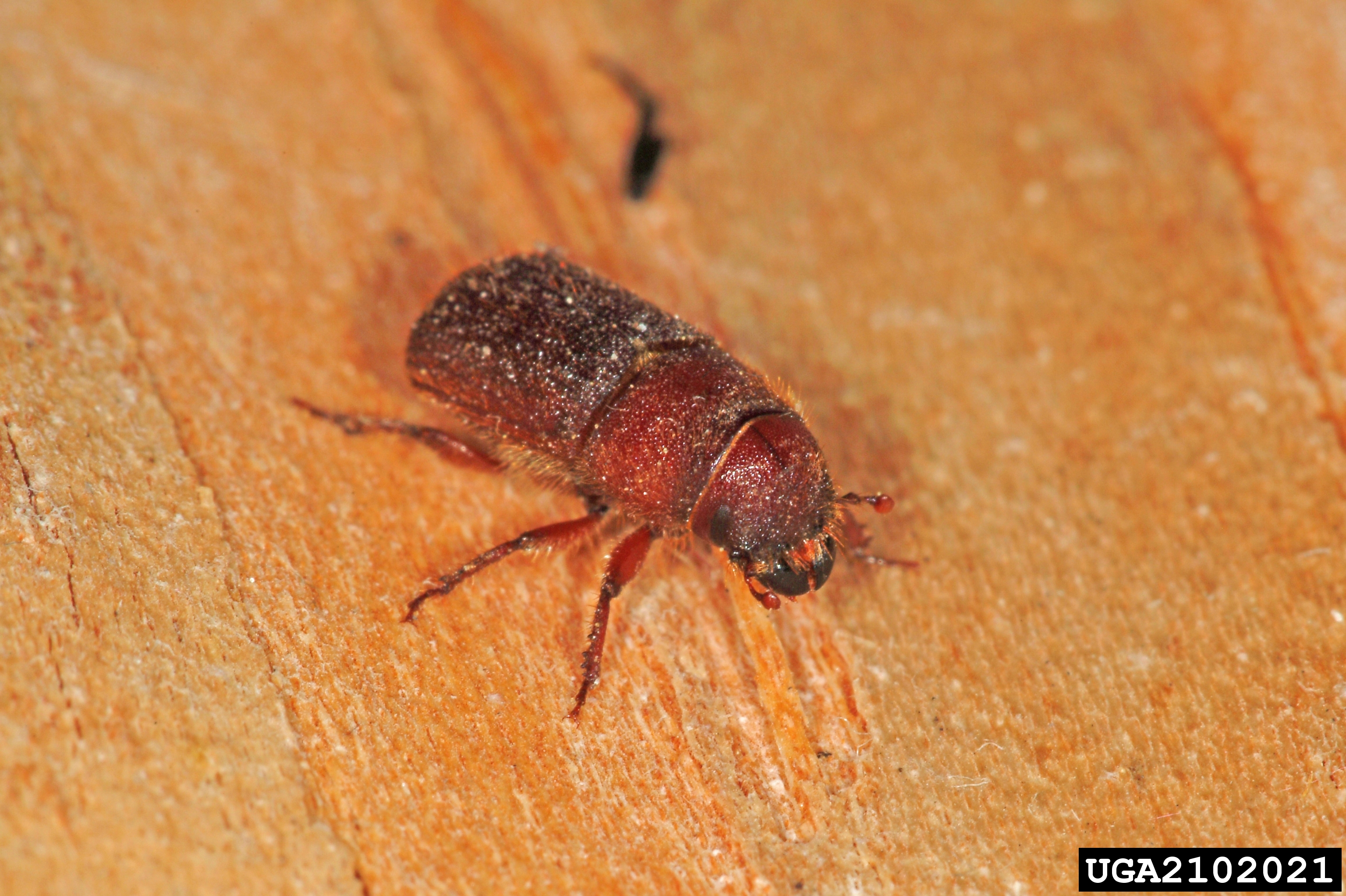

Scientific classification
- Kingdom: Animalia
- Phylum: Arthropoda
- Clade: Pancrustacea
- Class: Insecta
- Order: Coleoptera
- Suborder: Polyphaga
- Infraorder: Cucujiformia
- Superfamily: Curculionoidea
- Family: Curculionidae
- Genus: Dendroctonus
- Species: D. valens

Binomial name
- Dendroctonus valens LeConte, 1860

Synonyms
- Dendroctonus beckeri (Thatcher, 1954); Dendroctonus rhizophagus Thomas & Bright

= Dendroctonus valens =

Species of beetle

Dendroctonus valens, also known as the red turpentine beetle, is a species of bark beetle characterized by a dark-reddish brown hue. It is native to forests across North and Central America. In its adult form, these beetles range from six to ten millimeters in length. A notable characteristic about them is their use of acoustic signals and chemical cues when engaging in what is a very complex mating process.

While harmless in its native range, D. valens is a very destructive pest in China, where it was introduced and subsequently spread through wood shipments. It has killed more than six million pine trees across the country and biological control programs are currently being used to combat its deleterious effects on Chinese ecology.

== Description ==
The eggs are cylindrical with rounded ends, white, opaque and shiny, and about 1 mm (0.04 in) long. The larva is a white, legless grub, with a brown head and brown tip to the abdomen. As it grows, lateral rows of pale brown tubercles become apparent. The fully grown larva is 10 to 12 mm (0.39 to 0.47 in) long. The pupa is white; it is exarate, the antennae and legs being free and not enclosed in a cocoon. The adult beetle is 6 to 10 mm (0.24 to 0.39 in) long and about twice as long as it is wide. When it first emerges from the pupa, it is tan, but it soon turns dark reddish-brown.

== Distribution ==
Dendroctonus valens occurs in North and Central America. Its range extends from Canada and the northern and western parts of the United States, southwards to Mexico, Guatemala and Honduras. In the mid-1990s it was accidentally introduced into China, probably in wood packaging material, where it became established; an outbreak occurred in Shanxi Province in 1999, and it has since spread to Hebei, Henan and Shaanxi Provinces. It has a wide potential host range that could allow it to spread to other parts of China and more widely across Eurasia.

== Host range ==
In North America, this bark beetle attacks white fir (Abies concolor) and various species of spruce (Picea) and pine (Pinus). In China it mainly attacks Manchurian red pine (Pinus tabuliformis) and sometimes Chinese white pine (Pinus armandii). On tree stumps or recently dead trees, beetle presence is marked by the frass they produce mixed with dried resin; these structures are known as “pitch tubes”. These pitch tubes vary in color depending on the species of beetle in this family. Infected trees have shortened needles that are poorly retained, stunted growth, a sparse crown, and dead branches. Additionally, needle color progressively changes from green to yellowish-green, yellow, chestnut and red, at which point the tree will be classified as dead.

== Life cycle ==
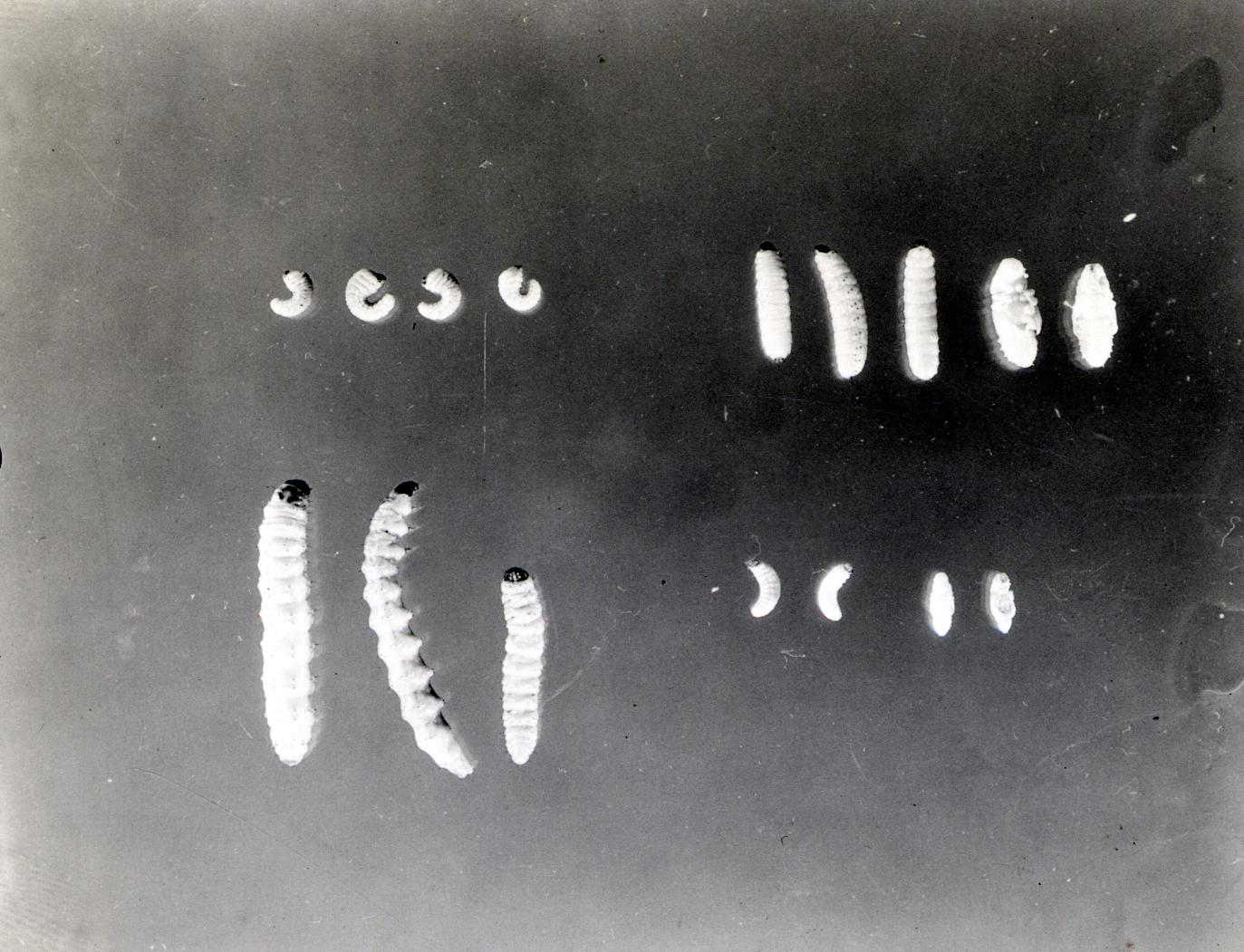
larval stage of Dendroctonus Valens

In the southern parts of its geographic range, D. valens can be active all year with multiple generations being present in a population at once. Further north, these beetles are active from May to October and only have a single generation each year; in these regions, larvae can take more than a year to mature. On living trees, the beetles excavate a hole within a meter or two off the ground. Upon successfully reaching the cambium layer, a pair of beetles mate and the female excavates a vertical gallery, on one side of which she lays her eggs in small clusters. The beetles continue to enlarge their galleries while the eggs incubate. When the eggs hatch, the larvae tunnel out a large communal gallery in the phloem and cambium which becomes filled with frass. When they have completed their development, after two months or more, they pupate in individual cells in this chamber, or in short side galleries. The rate of development is dependent on the temperature. Galleries can span from the lower parts of the tree trunks into the upper parts of the root system and beetles inhabiting northern regions will go into the roots to hibernate in the winter months. With the arrival of warmer weather in spring, the beetles bore their way out of the trunk and disperse, finding suitable host trees by detecting the ethanol, monoterpenes and pheromones.

In China, Dendroctonus valens primarily develop into their adult form over winter. Their dispersal period spans from mid-April to mid-May, during which they seek out and infest new host trees. This infestation process is facilitated by a pheromone-mediated mass attack strategy, essential for overcoming the tree's natural defenses. Once these defenses are breached, the beetles strategically transition from emitting aggregation pheromones, which draw in more beetles, to releasing anti-aggregation pheromones. This shift prevents excessive colonization, thereby averting the overexploitation of the host tree's resources.

Following successful colonization, the female beetles commence the reproductive phase by laying eggs in specially created egg chambers within the tree's phloem. The larvae then feed on this layer, completing their developmental stages within the safety of the tree. The cycle culminates in the fall, where the mature larvae pupate and emerge as adults from the pupal chambers, ready to overwinter and begin the cycle anew the following spring.

== Mating ==
=== Mate selection ===
During the initial mass attack phase when mating occurs, D. valens has a female-biased sex ratio, leading to more female competition and male selectivity for mates.

The mate selection process in Dendroctonus valens is a sophisticated sequence of behaviors influenced by multiple factors. Extensive research has revealed that male beetles demonstrate a clear preference for larger females, which are associated with higher levels of fecundity. In several binary choice experiments by Liu et al., this preference is discernible through male D. valens' selective entrance into the larger tunnels and the tunnels with larger resident female sizes. Males possess the ability to assess the dimensions of these tunnels, preferring larger constructions that correlate with larger females.

Acoustic signals emitted by the females play a significant role in attracting males, particularly at short ranges. The intensity of a female's chirp positively correlates with her body size and is a crucial attractant for males. These chirps are integral in the males' mate selection process, with males displaying a marked preference for louder sounds. This indicates that males rely on dual cues for mate selection: the physical dimension of the female's habitat (tunnel size) and her acoustic emissions. The ability to distinguish between soft and loud chirps allows males to select mates that are likely to enhance their reproductive success.

Chemical cues are usually involved in the mating selection process. Experiments showed that males are attracted to both female pheromones and frass. Females chosen through these chemical cues have faster oviposition rates and larval development, and the pairs have less aggressive courtships and longer copulation time.

Interestingly, while males exhibit selectivity in mate choice, females of D. valens display no such choosiness. They accept males of any size, with no observed instances of expulsion after mating.

=== Mating behavior ===
D. valens exhibits a monogamous mating relationship. The mating sequence begins when a female constructs a gallery under the bark, releasing pheromones to attract a male from a long distance and emitting acoustic signals to attract from a short distance. Upon locating a female, the male enters the gallery, where mating occurs. The continuation of acoustic communication between the male and female, often resembling a courtship duet, further facilitates the bonding and mating process. Notably, the male typically remains in the gallery post-mating, effectively blocking the entrance and ensuring monogamy.

== Physiology ==
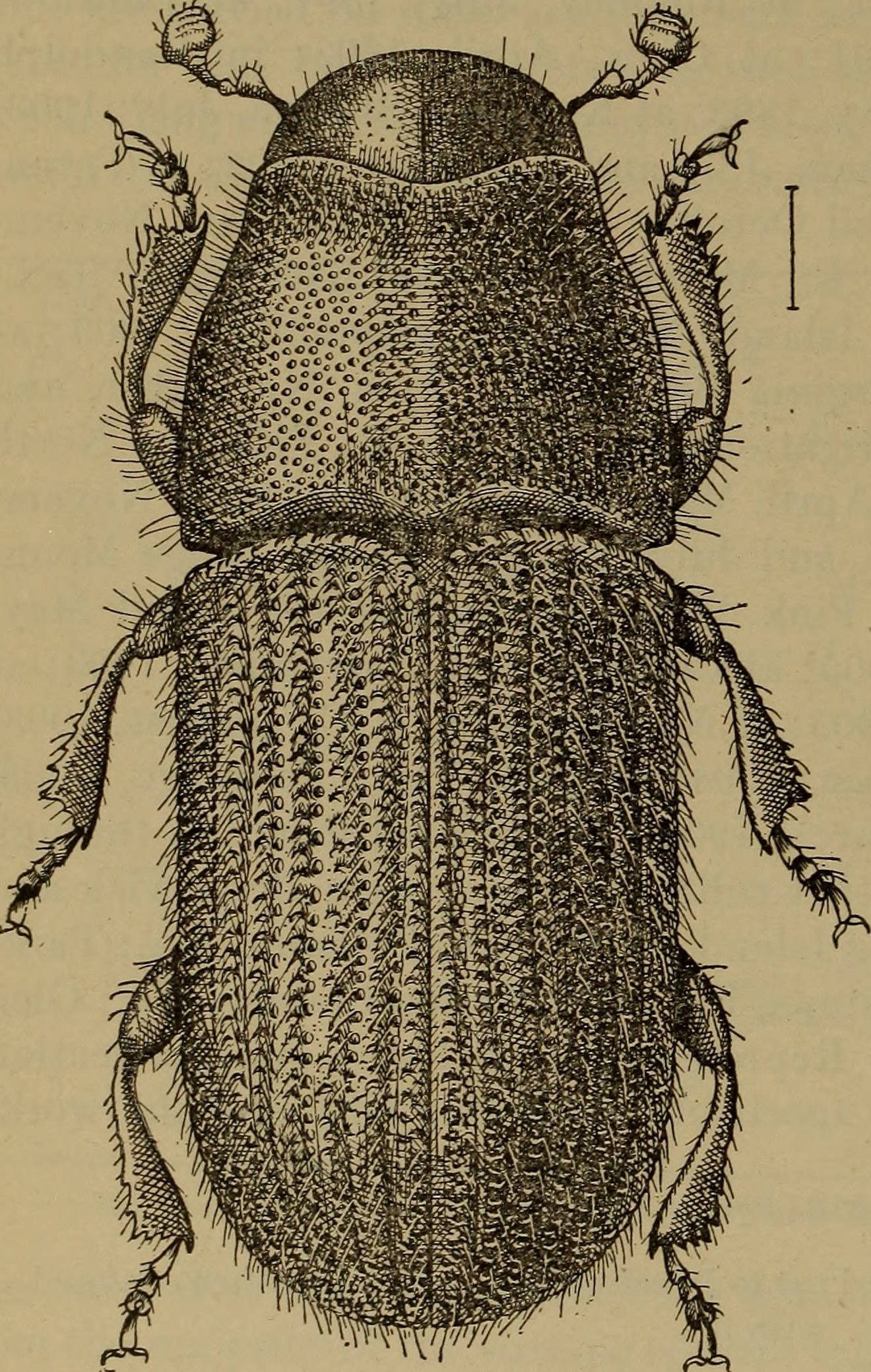
Drawing of D. Valens

=== Acoustic communication ===
Acoustic communication is pivotal for the survival and reproductive processes of Dendroctonus valens. These beetles produce sound, specifically through a method called stridulation, to facilitate various essential life functions, including mate attraction, nutrient/habitat acquisition, and intraspecies competition.

The acoustic communication during mating rituals of D. valens is particularly notable, where both male and female beetles produce "agreement sounds" when the male digs into the entrance of the female’s tunnel. When exposed to the pheromone frontalin, female beetles emit a specific chirp with a frequency of 689.1 Hz lasting 23.1 ms. Males produce similar chirps in response to female signals, thus initiating a courtship duet. Phonotaxis experiments have revealed that male beetles are attracted to louder agreement chirps, indicating that sound volume, which positively correlates with female body size, plays a crucial role in mate selection. This phenomenon underscores the adaptive significance of acoustic signals in facilitating successful mating encounters.

Furthermore, both sexes use acoustic communication for reasons beyond mating. They produce chirps to compete for mates. The males also produce aggressive/rival chirps in territorial competitions. Such behaviors highlight the multifunctional role of sound in the beetles' ecological and social spheres.

== Mutualism ==
=== Fungal association ===
D. valens has a significant ecological association with Ophiostomatalean fungi, a group of ascomycete fungi comprising species that are detrimental to forest health, such as those causing Dutch elm disease and black stain root disease in conifers. As of current records, the beetle is linked with 32 species of these fungi, including seven novel species identified from both the United States and China through detailed morphological and phylogenetic analyses.

In China, L. procerum has a significant role in the decline of Pinus tabuliformis trees, and it was once thought to have entered China along with D. valens. However, L. procerum was not found in western America, where the source of D. valens in China was thought to have originated. Research indicates that L. procerum, while currently associated with the beetle, likely originated in Europe and entered China independently of the beetle, challenging previous assumptions about the beetle's role in spreading this particular fungus. The co-invasion of D. valens and L. procerum induces the production of 3-carene by the host tree, a major attractant for the beetle.

Furthermore, the relationship between D. valens and its fungal associates is not based on specialized internal structures for carrying these fungi; instead, it involves external symbiotic interactions that vary with environmental factors. This complex interplay may involve phoretic mites, which are known to carry vector fungi between trees and beetles. Therefore, the ecological relationships between D. valens, its fungal associates, and mites highlight a multifaceted system of interaction that influences forest health and the dynamics of tree diseases.

=== Yeast association ===
The symbiotic relationships between Dendroctonus valens and various yeasts play a critical role in the beetle's survival, development, and ecological interactions. These yeasts, often transported phoretically by the adult beetles, contribute significantly to the beetle's life cycle by providing essential nutrients, interacting with filamentous fungi, modifying phytochemicals of tree tissues, and influencing the beetle's chemical communication. Such interactions enhance the bark beetle's ability to counteract host plant defenses and facilitate the yeast's dispersal and outbreeding opportunities.

The ecological roles of yeasts associated with D. valens are multifaceted, ranging from pheromone transformation, which aids in beetle communication, to the assimilation of complex sugars like cellobiose and d-xylose, which are not typically found in soluble form in nature. Certain yeasts, such as K. capsulata and Ca. nitratophila from the Ogataea clade have been identified as significant for their ability to transform verbenol to verbenone, a process crucial for beetle communication and interaction with their environment. Moreover, these yeasts support the nutritional needs of D. valens, particularly in nitrogen-poor diets like phloem, by concentrating nitrogen and providing essential nutrients.

The presence and functions of these yeasts, particularly in the Chinese populations of D. valens, where Ca. nitratophila has been notably identified, suggesting a geographical variation in yeast-beetle interactions that may influence the success and distribution of these beetles. Studying these relationships is crucial for understanding the complex dynamics between bark beetles, their microbial symbionts, and their host plants, shedding light on the intricate web of ecological interactions that define their survival and proliferation.

=== Detoxification strategies ===
Dendroctonus valens confronts significant challenges from the defensive chemicals produced by its host plants, particularly conifers. These plants emit compounds like α-pinene, a volatile monoterpene, as part of their defense mechanisms against herbivore attacks. α-Pinene has been shown to be particularly toxic to D. valens, leading to physiological, behavioral, and metabolic stress by increasing the number of lysosomes and mitochondria in the beetle's midgut cells. To overcome these challenges, D. valens has evolved a symbiotic relationship with various microorganisms that assist in the detoxification process.

The microorganisms associated with D. valens, including strains of Pseudomonas sp., Serratia sp., and the yeast Candida piceae, play a crucial role in enabling the beetle to colonize host plants successfully. These microbes comprising both yeast and bacteria have been found, in an in vitro experiment, to degrade more than 50% and 70%, respectively, of α-pinene in their environment within 24 hours. The symbiosis between D. valens and these microorganisms is a vital adaptation, allowing the beetle to bypass the plant's chemical defenses and access the nutrients and habitat within. This relationship highlights the complex interactions between insect herbivores, their host plants, and associated microbial communities, underscoring the importance of these microorganisms in the ecological success of D. valens.

== Pest ==
In its native range, D. valens infests the stumps of newly felled trees, as well as attacking trees stressed by such things as drought, wildfire or root disturbance. In China the beetle infests healthy as well as stressed trees, the heaviest attacks being in Shanxi Province at altitudes of between 600 and 2,000 m (2,000 and 6,600 ft). Here, forests have been widely planted to reduce erosion and prevent million of tonnes of soil being washed each year into the Yellow River. An area of 500,000 hectares (1,200,000 acres) planted with Pinus tabuliformis since 1900 has been affected by the beetles, with six million trees being killed. Older stands of this tree have been attacked while more recently planted forests in general have not. The low winter rainfall in these mountains has stressed the trees and warm winters have encouraged the beetle's survival. A European species of bark beetle, Dendroctonus micans, which attacks spruce trees, is specifically preyed on by a predatory beetle Rhizophagus grandis. Research in China has shown that R. grandis will also attack D. valens, and the predatory beetle is being mass reared for release in China in a biological control programme for this invasive pest.

Lindgren funnel traps have also been considered as a potential mechanism for catching D. valens. These traps can be baited with pheromones to attract various bark beetles such as this one. The primary concern is that while these traps reliably bait and capture adults during flight, they can also attract beetles to the area, leading to tree attacks. Therefore, considering placement in terms of proximity to susceptible trees is very important. Preventative insecticides can also help protect these trees, as well as performing continuous maintenance on them to ensure that they are staying healthy.
