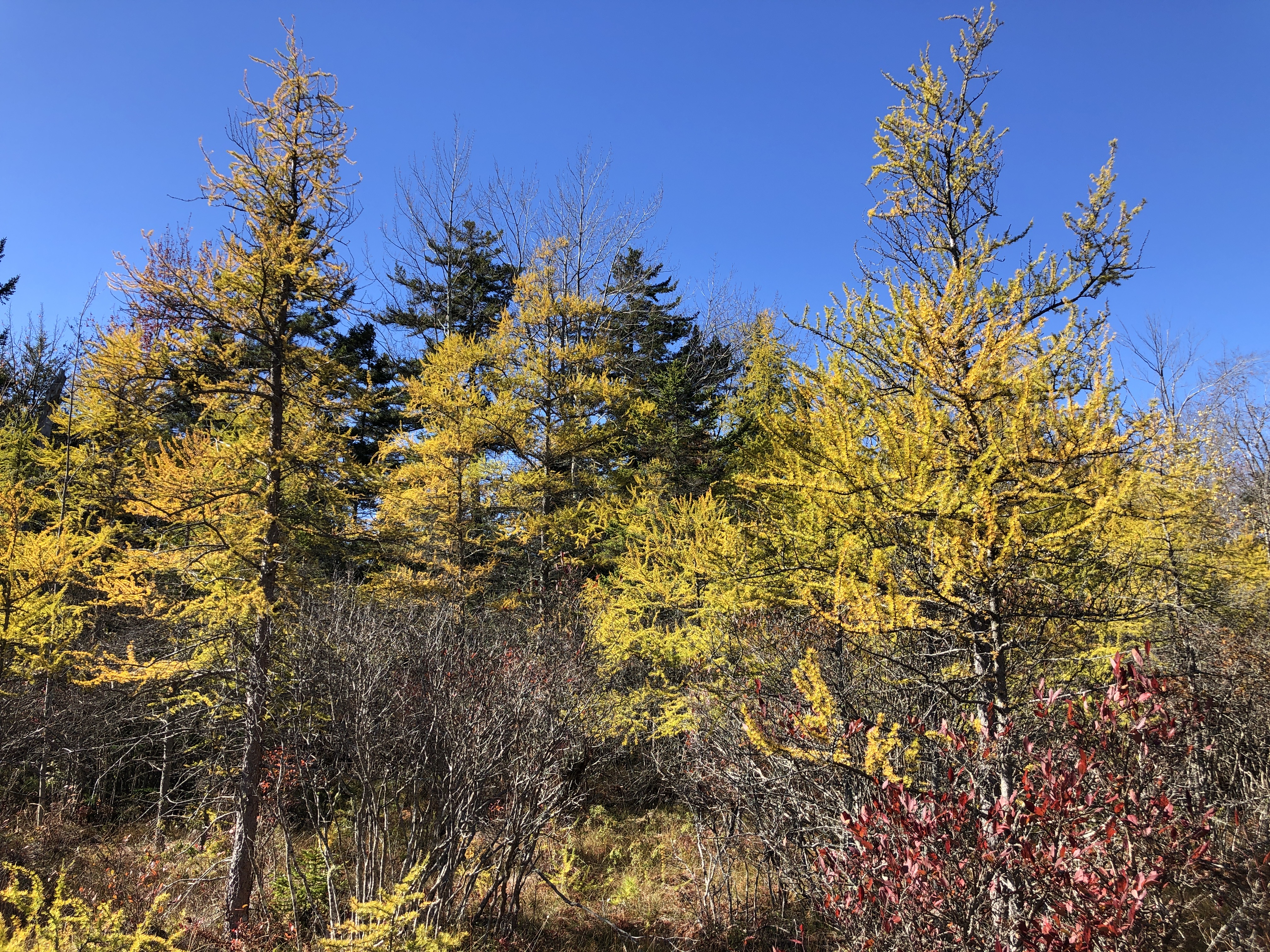
- Tamarack larch in fall colors, with red spruce in the background

Conservation status
- Least Concern (IUCN 3.1)

Scientific classification
- Kingdom: Plantae
- Clade: Tracheophytes
- Clade: Gymnosperms
- Division: Pinophyta
- Class: Pinopsida
- Order: Pinales
- Family: Pinaceae
- Genus: Larix
- Species: L. laricina

Binomial name
- Larix laricina (Du Roi) K. Koch
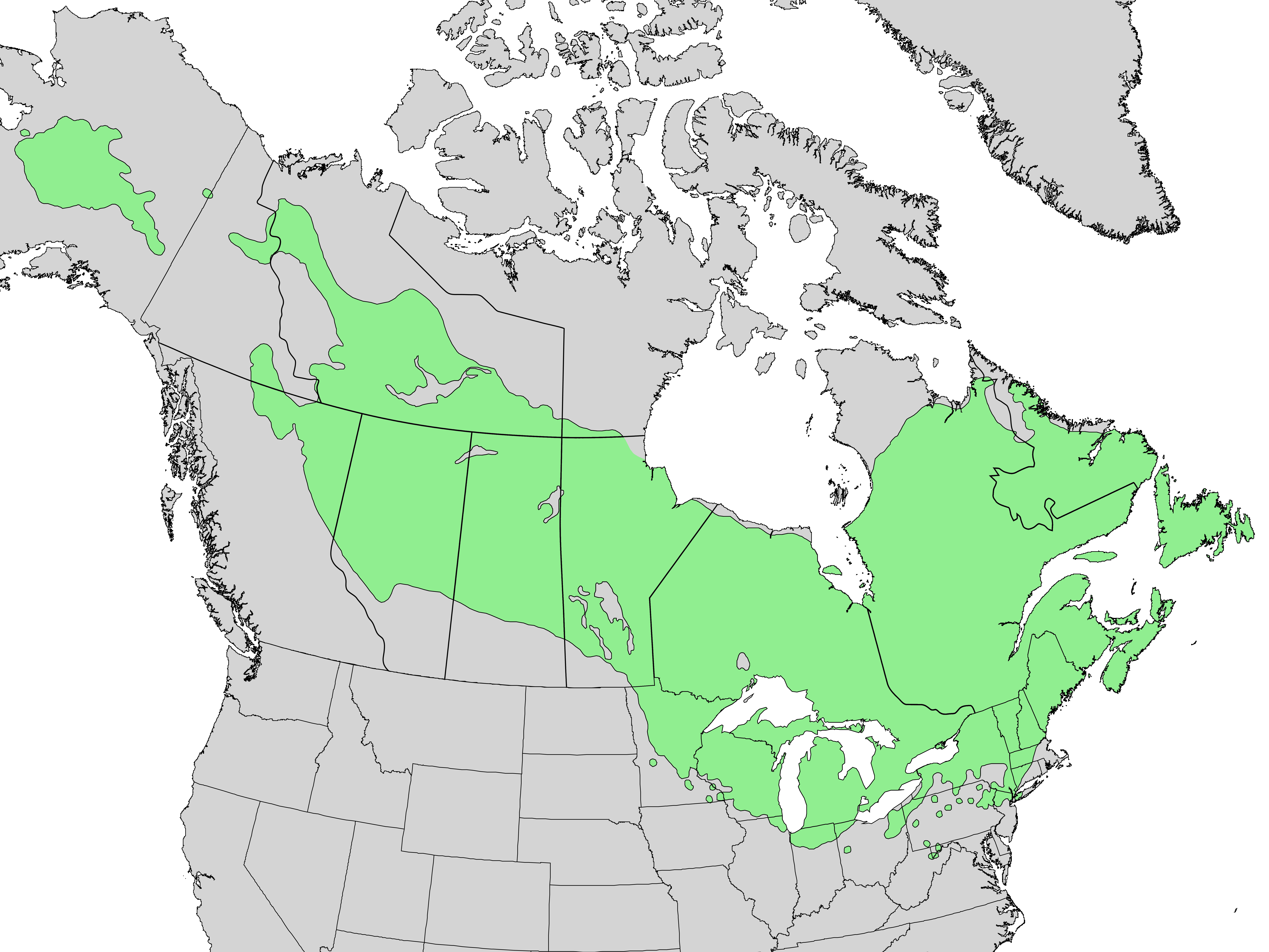
- Natural range of Larix laricina

Synonyms
- Abies microcarpa (Lamb.) Lindl.; Larix alaskensis W.Wight; Larix americana Michx.; Larix fraseri Curtis ex Gordon; Larix intermedia (Du Roi) Lodd. ex J.Forbes; Larix microcarpa (Lamb.) J.Forbes; Larix rubra Steud.; Larix tenuifolia Salisb.; Pinus intermedia Du Roi; Pinus laricina Du Roi; Pinus microcarpa Lamb.

= Larix laricina =

Species of larch native to North America

Larix laricina, commonly known as the tamarack, hackmatack, eastern larch, black larch, red larch, or American larch, is a species of larch native to Canada, from eastern Yukon and Inuvik, Northwest Territories east to Newfoundland, and also south into the upper northeastern United States from Minnesota to Cranesville Swamp, West Virginia; there is also an isolated population in central Alaska.

== Description ==
Larix laricina is a small to medium-size boreal deciduous conifer tree common to low-land areas such as swamps, fens, and bogs, reaching 15–23 m (49–75 ft) tall, with a trunk up to 60 cm (24 in) in diameter. The bark of mature trees is reddish, the young trees are gray with smooth bark. The leaves are needle-like, 2.5 cm (1 in) long, and light blue-green, produced on long woody spur shoots in groups of 10–20. Prior to falling off in the autumn, the leaves turn bright yellow, leaving the shoots bare until the next spring. The cones are the smallest of any larch, only 1–2.3 cm (3/8–7/8 in) long, with 12–25 seed scales; they are bright red, turning brown before opening to release the seeds once mature 4 to 6 months after pollination.

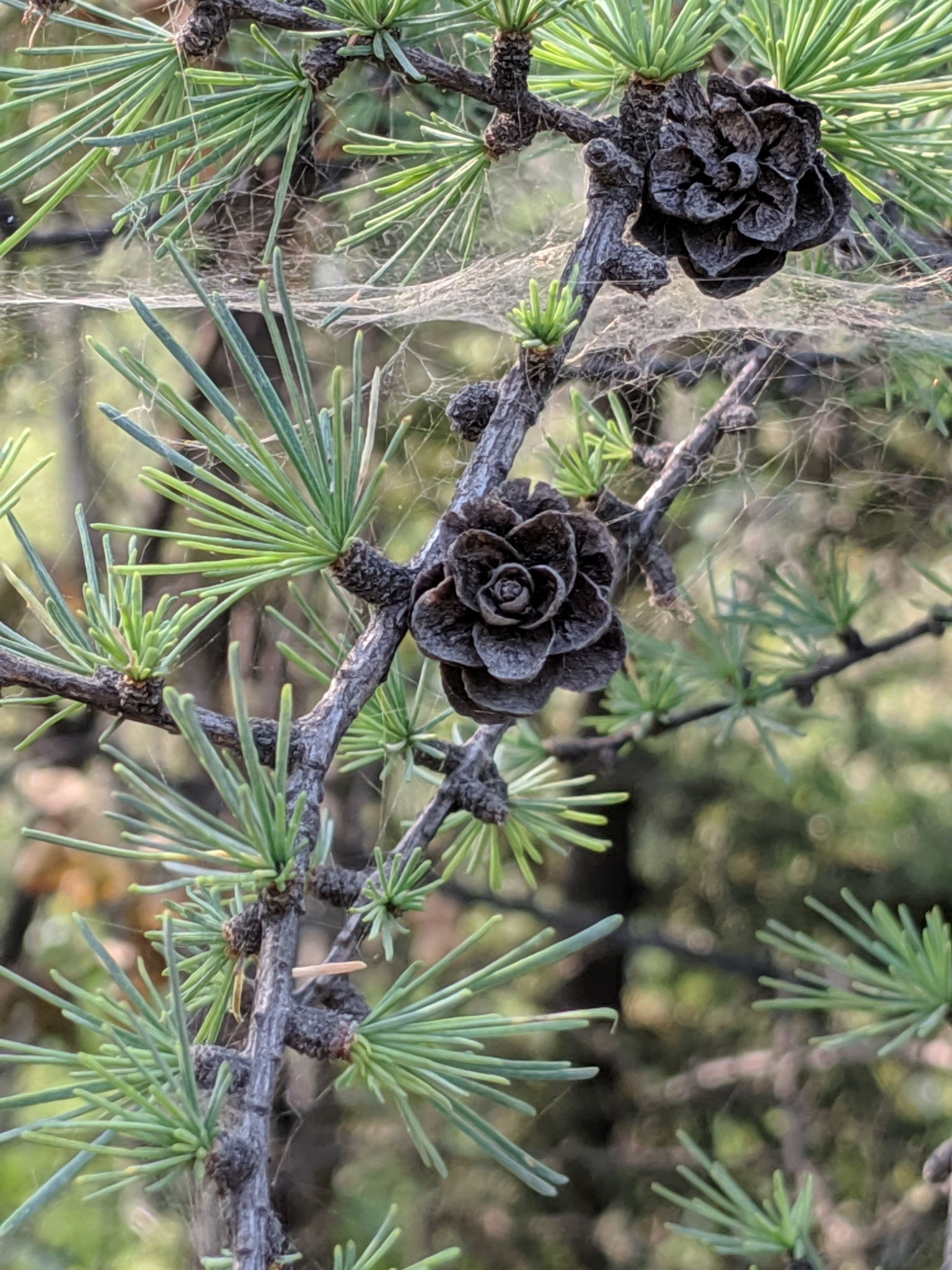
Cones and leaves

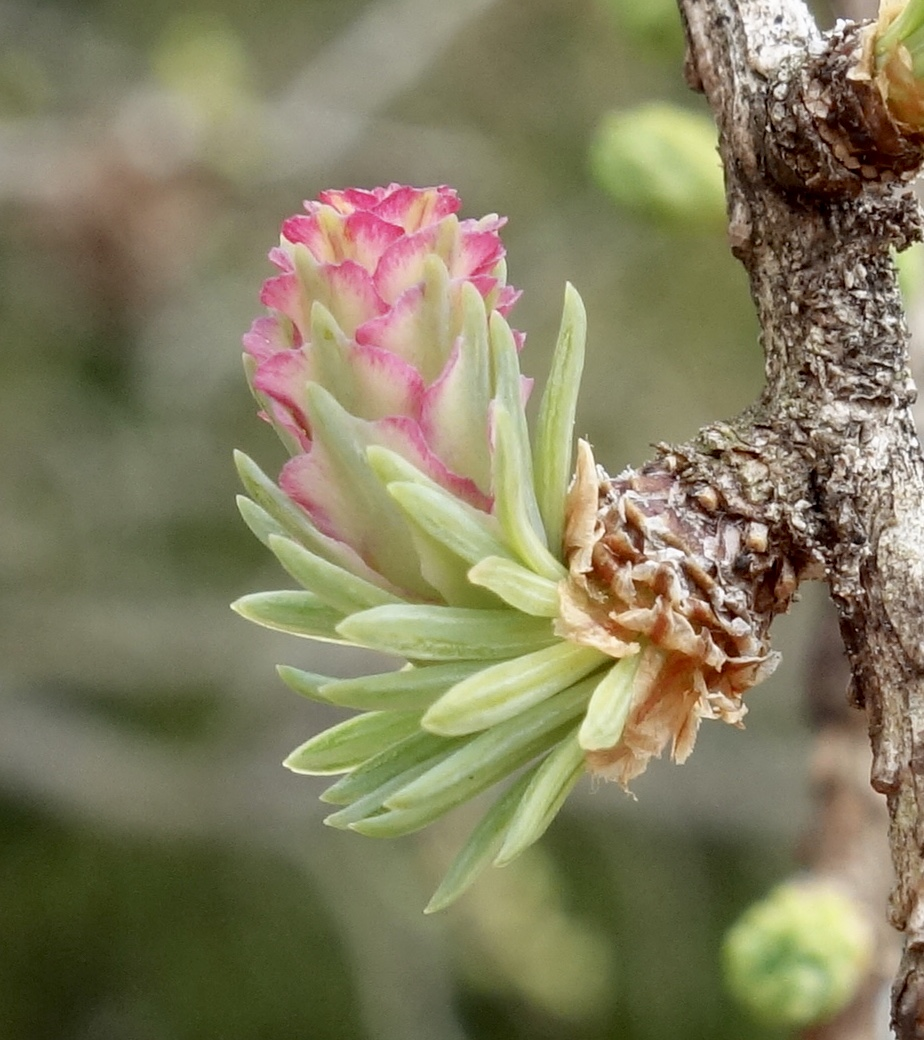
Young female cone

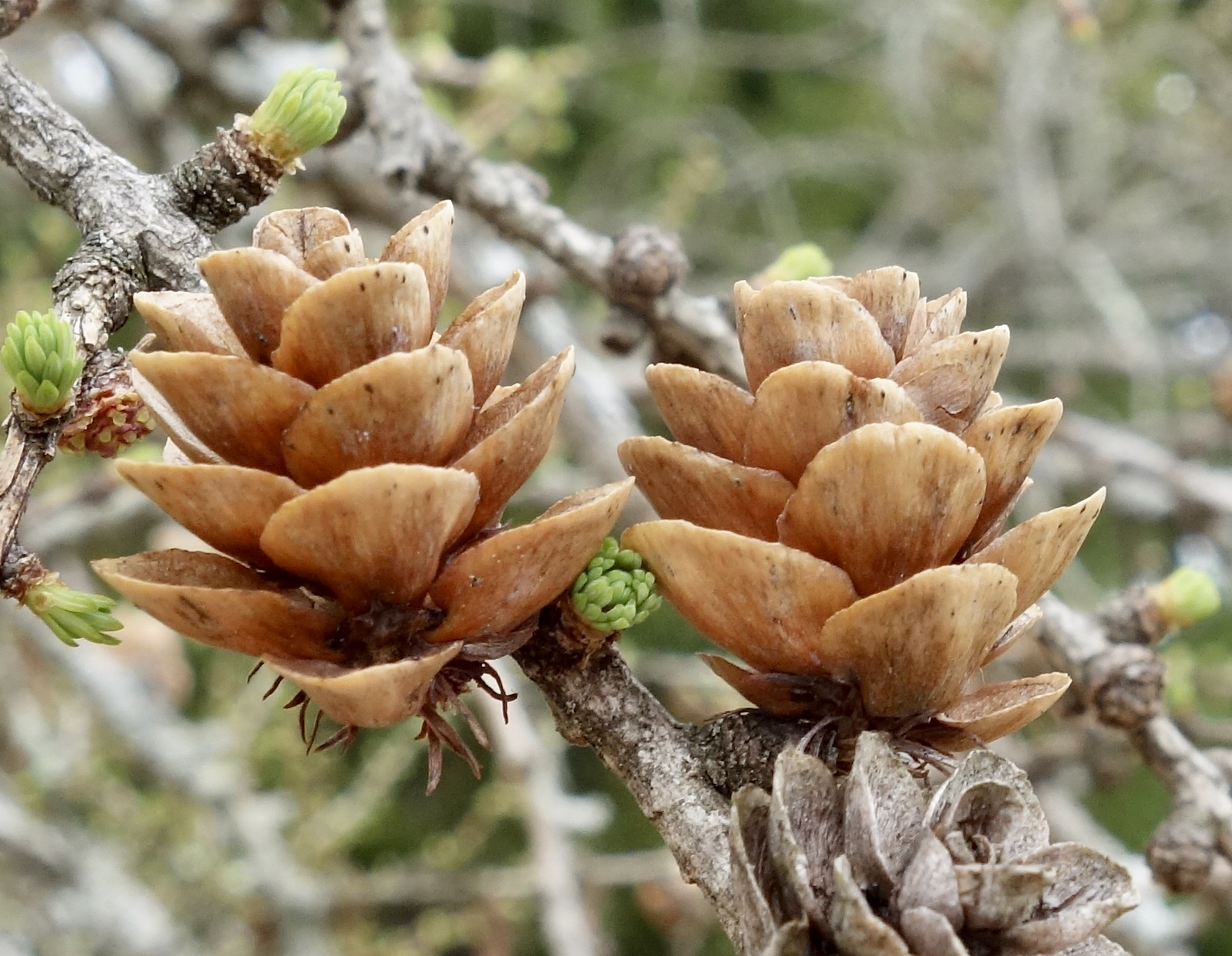
Old seed cones

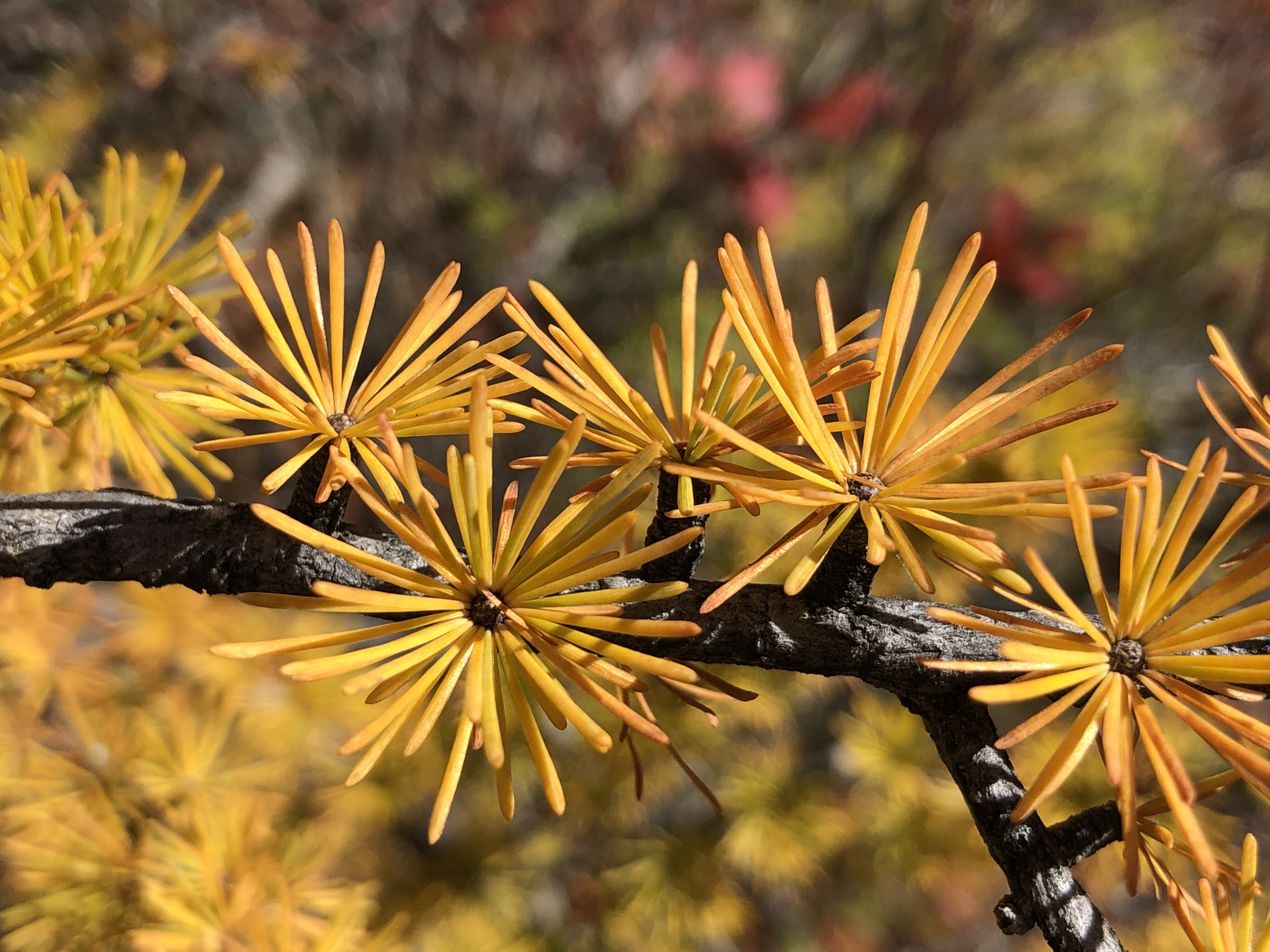
Close view of autumn leaves

== Distribution and ecology ==
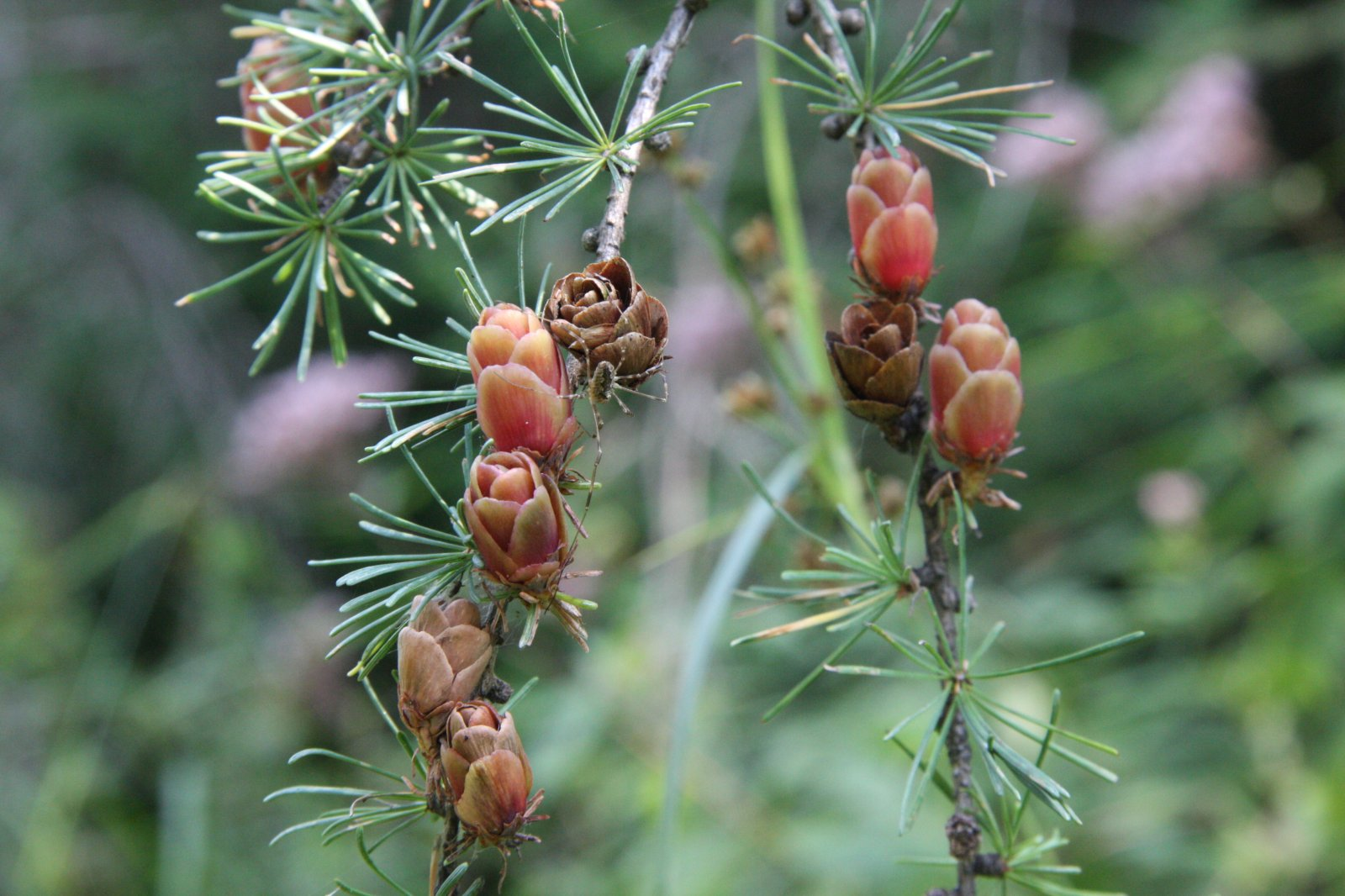
Tamarack larch foliage and cones in August. The lighter brown cones are from the current season; the darker brown cones are mature cones from previous seasons.

Tamaracks are very cold tolerant, able to survive temperatures down to at least −62 °C (−80 °F), and commonly occurs at the Arctic tree line at the edge of the tundra. Trees in these severe climatic conditions are smaller than farther south, often only 3 m (10 ft) tall. They can tolerate a wide range of soil conditions but grow most commonly in swamps, bogs, or muskegs, in wet to moist organic soils such as sphagnum, peat, and woody peat.They are also found on mineral soils that range from heavy clay to coarse sand; thus texture does not seem to be limiting. Although tamarack can grow well on calcareous soils, it is not abundant on the limestone areas of eastern Ontario.

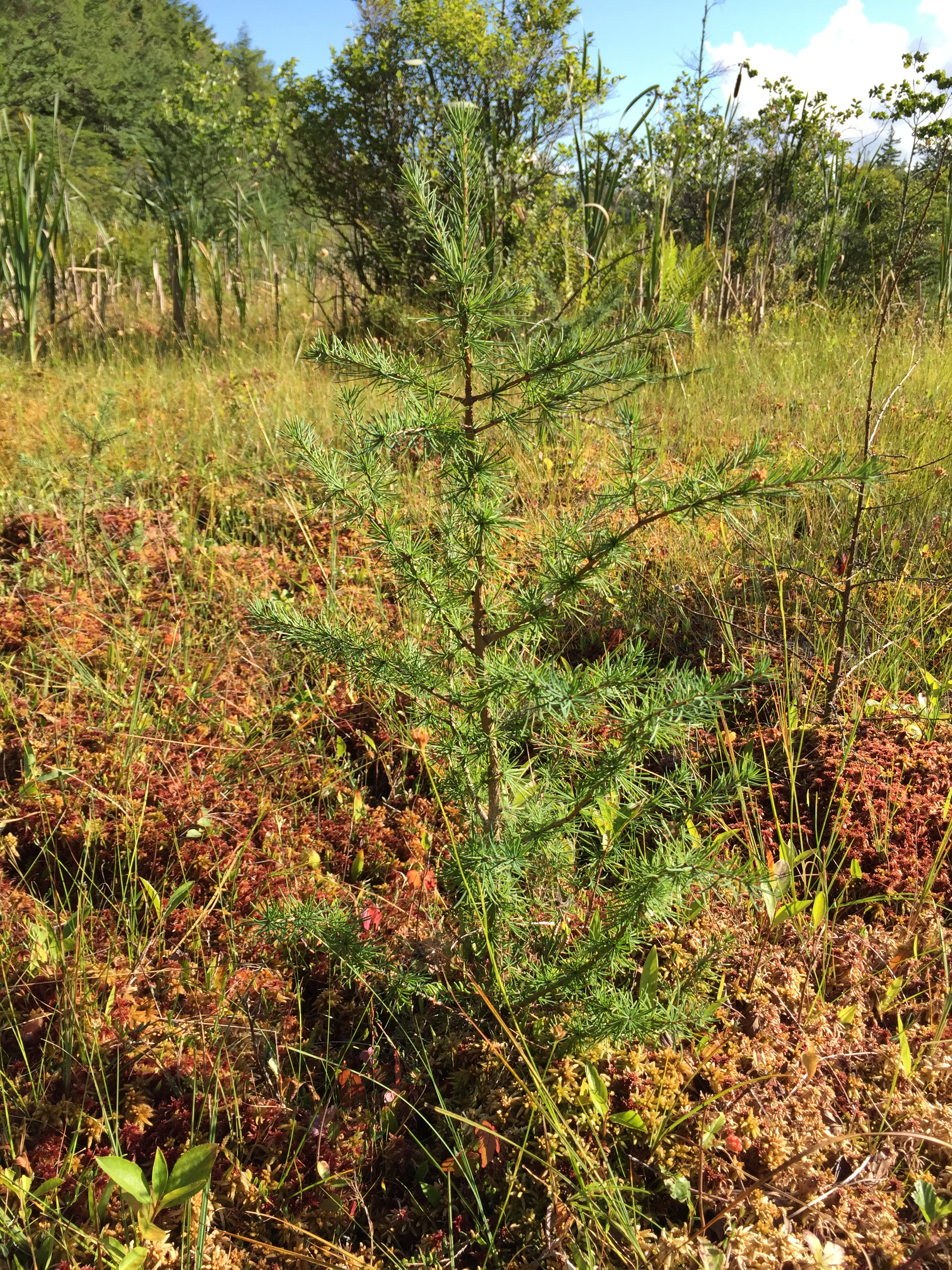
Tamarack sapling in a sphagnum bog

Tamarack is generally the first forest tree to grow on filled-lake bogs. In the lake states, tamarack may appear first in the sedge mat, sphagnum moss, or not until the bog shrub stage. Farther north, it is the pioneer tree in the bog shrub stage. Tamarack is fairly well adapted to reproduce successfully on burns, so it is one of the common pioneers on sites in the boreal forest immediately after a fire.

The central Alaskan population, separated from the eastern Yukon populations by a gap of about 700 kilometres (430 mi), is treated as a distinct variety Larix laricina var. alaskensis by some botanists, though others argue that it is not sufficiently distinct to be distinguished.

=== Damaging agents ===
Tamaracks are easily susceptible to fires, as they have shallow roots and thin bark. The tamarack's shallow root system also leaves it susceptible to being knocked over by high-speed winds. It has also been discovered that abnormally high water levels often kill tamarack stands. Flooding, mainly caused by beaver dams and newly constructed roads, can kill off stands and damage adventitious roots.

Tamaracks are targeted by many species of insects. One of the most prominent damaging insects is larch sawfly, which is non-native. It causes damage across its range and causes defoliation which can kill the trees within 6 to 9 years. To lessen the problem, parasites have been imported to kill the larch sawflies in parts of Minnesota and Manitoba. Another serious defoliator is the larch casebearer (Coleophora laricella). All tamaracks are susceptible to being killed by the larch casebearer, however recently the outbreaks of larch casebearer have been less severe.

There are some other insects that can harm Tamaracks, including spruce budworm (Choristoneura fumiferana); the larch-bud moth (Zeiraphera improbana); the spruce spider mite (Oligonychus ununguis); the larch-shoot moth (Argyresthia laricella); and the eastern larch beetle (Dendroctonus simplex). Healthy trees are left mostly unaffected by eastern larch beetles. Defoliation by the larch casebearer makes infestation of the eastern larch beetle more likely.

Only one of the many pathogens that affect Tamarack causing diseases serious enough to have an economic impact on its culture, is the Lachnellula willkommii fungus. It is a relatively new pathogen in Canada, first recorded in 1980 and originating in Europe. The fungus causes the formation of large cankers and a disease known as larch canker which is particularly harmful to the tamarack larch, killing both young and mature trees. Rust is the only common foliage disease amongst Tamaracks, and causes minimal damage to the trees. The needle-cast fungus (Hypodermella laricis) is also a cause for concern in Tamaracks.

=== Associated forest cover ===
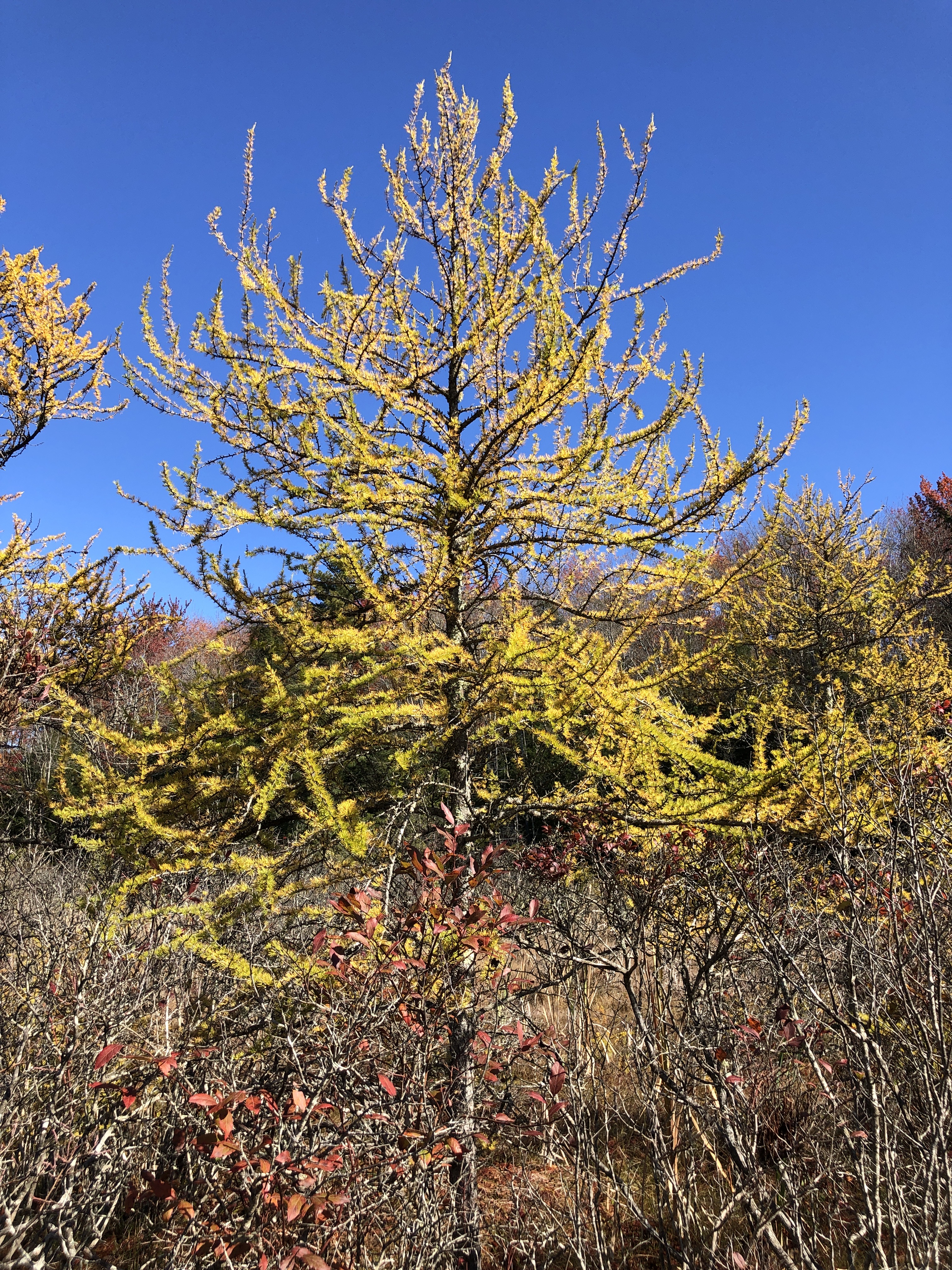
Young tree with fall color

Tamarack forms extensive pure stands in the boreal region of Canada and in northern Minnesota. In the rest of its United States range and in the Maritime Provinces, tamarack is found locally in both pure and mixed stands.

Black spruce (Picea mariana) is usually tamarack's main associate in mixed stands on all sites. Other commonly associated overgrowth species include balsam fir (Abies balsamea), white spruce (Picea glauca), and quaking aspen (Populus tremuloides) in the boreal region. In the better organic soil sites in the northern forest region, the most common associates are the northern white-cedar (Thuja occidentalis), balsam fir, black ash (Fraxinus nigra), and red maple (Acer rubrum). In Alaska, quaking aspen and tamarack are almost never found together. Additional common associates are American elm (Ulmus americana), balsam poplar (Populus balsamifera), jack pine (Pinus banksiana), paper birch (Betula papyrifera), Kenai birch (B. papyrifera var. kenaica), and yellow birch (B. alleghaniensis).

There are a vast number of shrubs associated with Tamarack due to their range, some of the common ones are dwarf and swamp birch (Betula glandulosa and Betula pumila), willows (Salix spp.), speckled alder (Alnus rugosa), and red-osier dogwood (Cornus stolonifera) bog Labrador tea (Ledum groenlandicum), bog-rosemary (Andromeda glaucophylla), leather leaf (Chamaedaphne calyculata), blueberries and huckleberries (Vaccinium spp.) and small cranberry (Vaccinium oxycoccos). Characteristically the herbaceous cover includes sedges (Carex spp.), cottongrass (Eriophorum spp.), three-leaved false Solomonseal (Maianthemum trifolium), marsh cinquefoil (Potentilla palustris), marsh-marigold (Caltha palustris), and bogbean (Menyanthes trifoliata).

== Uses ==
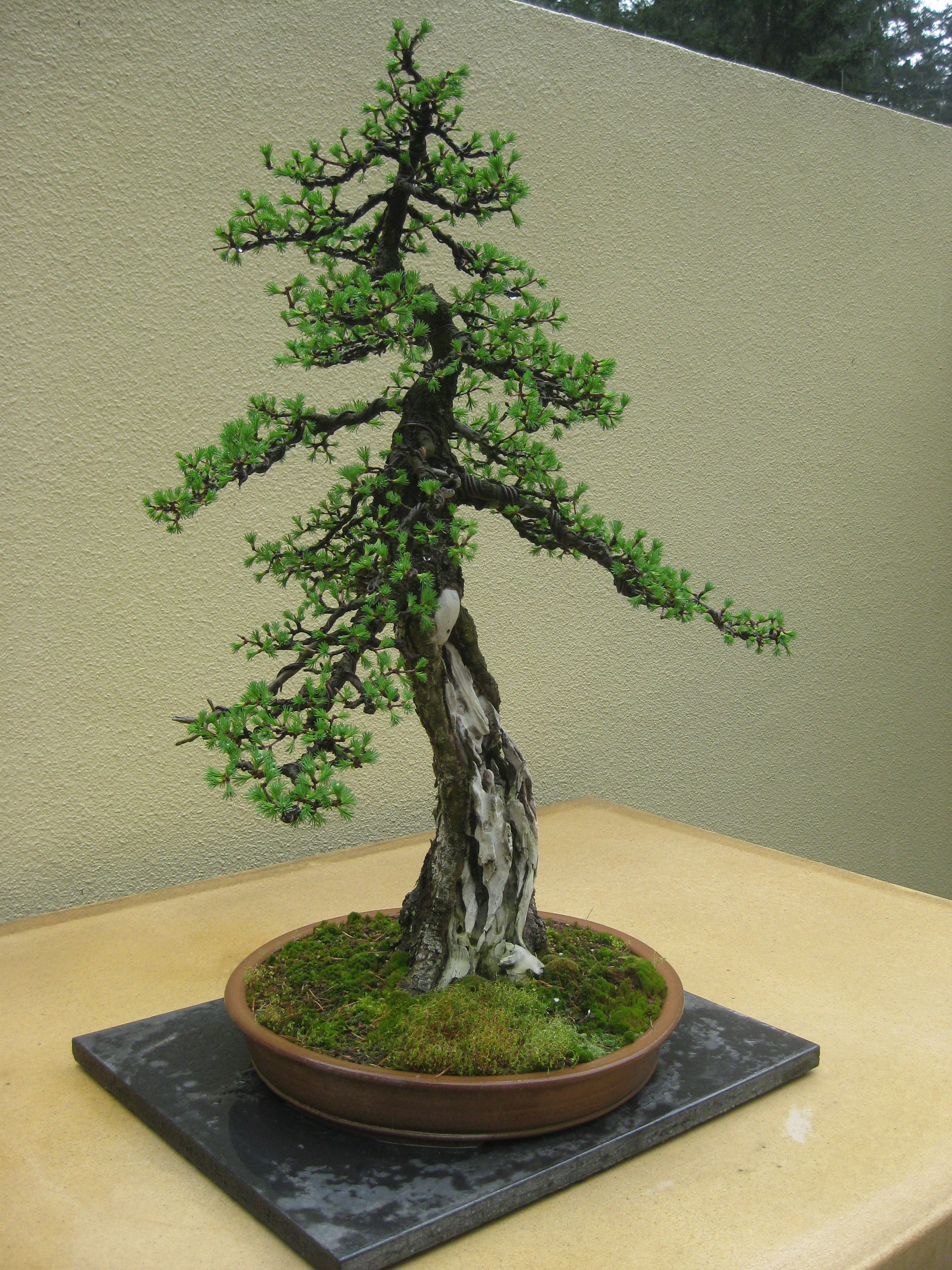
Larix laricina bonsai

The wood is tough and durable, but also flexible in thin strips, and was used by the Algonquian people for making snowshoes and other products where toughness was required. The natural crooks located in the stumps and roots are also preferred for creating knees in wooden boats. Currently, the wood is used principally for pulpwood, but also for posts, poles, rough lumber, and fuelwood; it is not a major commercial timber species. Tamarack wood is also used as kickboards in horse stables. Older log homes built in the 19th century sometimes incorporated tamarack along with other species like red or white oak. The hewn logs have a coarse grainy surface texture.

It is also grown as an ornamental tree in gardens in cold regions. Several dwarf cultivars have been created that are available commercially. Tamarack is commonly used for bonsai.

Tamarack poles were used in corduroy roads because of their resistance to rot. Tamarack posts were used before 1917 in Alberta to mark the northeast corner of sections surveyed within townships. They were used by the surveyors because at that time the very rot-resistant wood was readily available in the bush and was light to carry. Their rot resistance was also why they were often used in early water distribution systems.

The aboriginal peoples of Canada's northwest regions used the inner bark as a poultice to treat cuts, infected wounds, frostbite, boils and hemorrhoids. The outer bark and roots are also said to have been used with another plant as a treatment for arthritis, cold and general aches and pains.

Wildlife use the tree for food and nesting. Porcupines eat the inner bark, snowshoe hares feeds on tamarack seedlings, and red squirrels eat the seeds. Birds that frequent tamaracks during the summer include the white-throated sparrow, song sparrow, veery, common yellowthroat, and Nashville warbler.

== Reaction to competition ==
Tamarack is very intolerant of shade. Although it can tolerate some shade during the first several years, it must become dominant to survive. When mixed with other species, it must be in the over story. The tree is a good self-pruner, and boles of 25- to 30-year-old trees may be clear for one-half or two-thirds their length.

Because tamarack is very shade-intolerant, it does not become established in its own shade. Consequently, the more tolerant black spruce eventually succeeds tamarack on poor bog sites, whereas northern white-cedar, balsam fir, and swamp hardwoods succeed tamarack on good swamp sites. Recurring sawfly outbreaks throughout the range of tamarack have probably sped the usual succession to black spruce or other associates.

Various tests on planting and natural reproduction indicate that competing vegetation hinders tamarack establishment.

The shade-intolerance of tamarack dictates the use of even-aged management. Some adaptation of clear cutting or seed-tree cutting is generally considered the best silvicultural system because tamarack seeds apparently germinate better in the open, and the seedlings require practically full light to survive and grow well. Tamarack is also usually wind-firm enough for the seed-tree system to succeed. Satisfactory reestablishment of tamarack, however, often requires some kind of site preparation, such as slash disposal and herbicide spraying.

== Names ==
The names tamarack and hackmatack appear to derive from Algonquian but have undergone contamination with the word tacamahac, from Nahuatl, so the precise words that underlie them are unclear. The word akemantak meaning "wood used for snowshoes" has been cited as a name for the species, but the Proto-Algonquian *a·kema·xkwa this appears to represent was the name for the white ash.

== See also ==
- Larch ball
