= Frontalin =

Names
- IUPAC name (1S,5R)-1,5-dimethyl-6,8-dioxabicyclo[3.2.1]octane

Identifiers
CAS Number	28401-39-0; 57917-96-1; 60478-96-8
3D model (JSmol)	Interactive image
ChemSpider	9063286
PubChem CID	10888022
UNII	9T71ZVB55P
CompTox Dashboard (EPA)	DTXSID9041994
- InChI: InChI=1S/C8H14O2/c1-7-4-3-5-8(2,10-7)9-6-7/h3-6H2,1-2H3/t7-,8+/m0/s1 Key: AZWKCIZRVUVZPX-JGVFFNPUSA-N
- SMILES: C[C@@]12CCC[C@@](O1)(OC2)C

Properties
Chemical formula	C_{8}H_{14}O_{2}
Molar mass	142.20 g·mol^{−1}
- Except where otherwise noted, data are given for materials in their standard state (at 25 °C [77 °F], 100 kPa). Infobox references

Frontalin is a naturally occurring organic compound. It is a terpenoid and acetal that functions as a pheromone in bark beetles and elephants.

== Occurrence ==
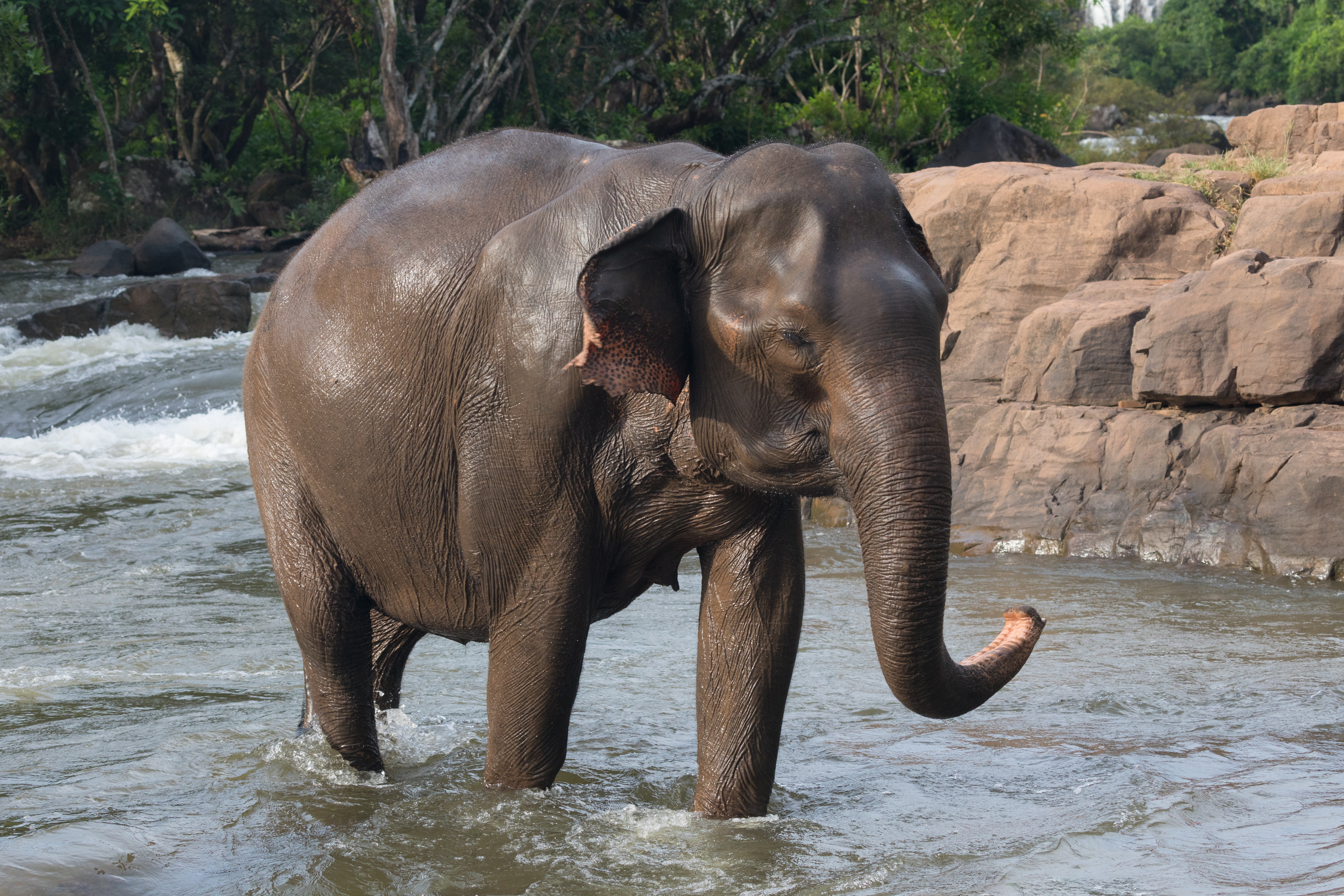
Asian elephant in Laos

Frontalin acts as an insect pheromone in bark beetles of the genus Dendroctonus, including Dendroctonus frontalis (Southern Pine Beetle) and Dendroctonus brevicomis (Western Pine Beetle), as well as the Mountain Pine Beetle. The biologically active form is predominantly (-)-frontalin. However, (+)-frontalin also occurs in some cases. In Dendroctonus frontalis, the female mainly produces (-)-frontalin, the male mainly (+)-frontalin. In Dendroctonus rufipennis the distribution is reversed.

In addition to its role in insect pheromones, frontalin also serves as a pheromone in Asian elephants. It is secreted by adult male elephants during musth, with secretion levels increasing with age. It signals mating readiness, particularly attracting females who are also in the receptive phase of their sexual cycle.

== Biosynthesis ==
Unlike many pheromones in bark beetles, which are derived from terpenes present in host plants, frontalin does not follow this pathway. The biosynthesis in Dendroctonus jeffreyi and other species of the genus was studied using isotope labeling. The biosynthesis is believed to originate from acetate, with geranyl pyrophosphate and 6-methyl-6-hepten-2-one being probable intermediates.

== Synthesis ==
Both enantiomers of frontalin can be synthesized starting from the ester of 8-phenylmenthol with pyruvic acid. The alcohol component acts as a chiral auxiliary. In the presence of lithium perchlorate, methylmagnesium bromide can be added to the reactant. The resulting hydroxy group can then be reacted with the Cornforth reagent (pyridinium dichromate), followed by the addition of a Grignard compound derived from 5-bromo-2-methylpent-1-ene. Reduction with lithium aluminum hydride removes the chiral auxiliary, yielding a diol. Subsequent reaction with ozone and reductive work-up with dimethyl sulfide produces (-)-frontalin. By reversing the order of the Grignard reagents, i.e., adding methylmagnesium bromide second, (+)-frontalin can be obtained.

An alternative synthetic route begins with a Diels-Alder reaction between 3-buten-2-one and methacrylic acid methyl ester. The methyl ester can be reduced to a hydroxymethyl group using lithium aluminum hydride. Oxymercuration with mercury(II) acetate, followed by treatment with potassium hydroxide/ sodium borohydride, hydroxylates the double bond and allows for direct cyclization to frontalin.
