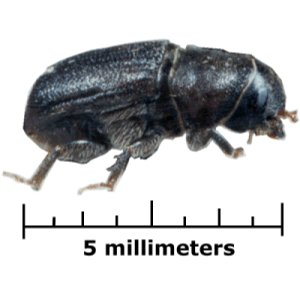
- Dendroctonus ponderosae adult

Scientific classification
- Kingdom: Animalia
- Phylum: Arthropoda
- Clade: Pancrustacea
- Class: Insecta
- Order: Coleoptera
- Suborder: Polyphaga
- Infraorder: Cucujiformia
- Superfamily: Curculionoidea
- Family: Curculionidae
- Subfamily: Scolytinae
- Tribe: Hylesinini
- Genus: Dendroctonus; Erichson, 1836

Species
- See text

= Dendroctonus =

Genus of beetles

Dendroctonus is a genus of bark beetles. It includes several species notorious for destroying trees in the forests of North America; the genus name in New Latin is derived from Ancient Greek δένδρον dendron "tree", and κτόνος ktonos "murder", alluding to its ability to kill trees.

== Ecology ==
The genus Dendroctonus has a symbiotic relationship with many different yeasts, particularly those in the genera Candida and Pichia that aid in digestion and pheromone production. Various bacterial species also appear to be associated with larvae or adults of different species of Dendroctonus. For example, the bacterial species Rahnella aquatilis, Stenotrophomonas maltophilia, Raoultella terrigena, Ponticoccus gilvus, and Kocuria marina help the species Dendroctonus rhizophagus by cellulose degradation.

== Selected species ==
Species include:

- Dendroctonus adjunctus – roundheaded pine beetle
- Dendroctonus approximatus – Mexican pine beetle
- Dendroctonus armandi – Chinese white pine beetle
- Dendroctonus barberi - southwestern pine beetle
- Dendroctonus beckeri
- Dendroctonus brevicomis – western pine beetle
- Dendroctonus engelmanni
- Dendroctonus frontalis – southern pine beetle (= D.arizonicus)
- Dendroctonus jeffreyi – Jeffrey pine beetle
- Dendroctonus mesoamericanus – Mesoamerican pine beetle
- Dendroctonus mexicanus – smaller Mexican pine beetle
- Dendroctonus micans – great spruce bark beetle
- Dendroctonus murrayanae – lodgepole pine beetle
- Dendroctonus parallelocollis – larger Mexican pine beetle
- Dendroctonus piceaperda Hopkins
- Dendroctonus ponderosae – mountain pine beetle
- Dendroctonus pseudotsugae – Douglas-fir beetle
- Dendroctonus punctatus – Allegheny spruce beetle
- Dendroctonus rufipennis – great spruce bark beetle
- Dendroctonus simplex – eastern larch beetle
- Dendroctonus terebrans – black turpentine beetle
- Dendroctonus valens – red turpentine beetle (= D.beckeri, D.rhizophagus)
- Dendroctonus vitei
