= Ponticoccus litoralis =

Ponticoccus

Scientific classification
- Domain: Bacteria
- Kingdom: Pseudomonadati
- Phylum: Pseudomonadota
- Class: Alphaproteobacteria
- Order: Rhodobacterales
- Family: Rhodobacteraceae
- Genus: Ponticoccus
- Species: P. litoralis

Binomial name
- Ponticoccus litoralis Hwang and Cho 2008

Type strain
- CECT 7786, CL-GR66, DSM 18986, KCCM 90028

Species of aerobic bacteria

Ponticoccus litoralis is a Gram-negative and strictly aerobic bacterium from the genus Ponticoccus which has been isolated from coastal seawater from Busan in Korea. It is a marine bacterium in the family Rhodobacteraceae.
