= Ponticoccus lacteus =

Ponticoccus

Scientific classification
- Domain: Bacteria
- Kingdom: Pseudomonadati
- Phylum: Pseudomonadota
- Class: Alphaproteobacteria
- Order: Rhodobacterales
- Family: Rhodobacteraceae
- Genus: Ponticoccus
- Species: P. lacteus

Binomial name
- Ponticoccus lacteus Yang et al. 2015

Type strain
- CGMCC 1.12986, JCM 30379, JL351

Species of bacterium

Ponticoccus lacteus is a Gram-negative, aerobic, rod-shaped and non-motile bacterium from the genus Ponticoccus which has been isolated from surface seawater from the South China Sea.
