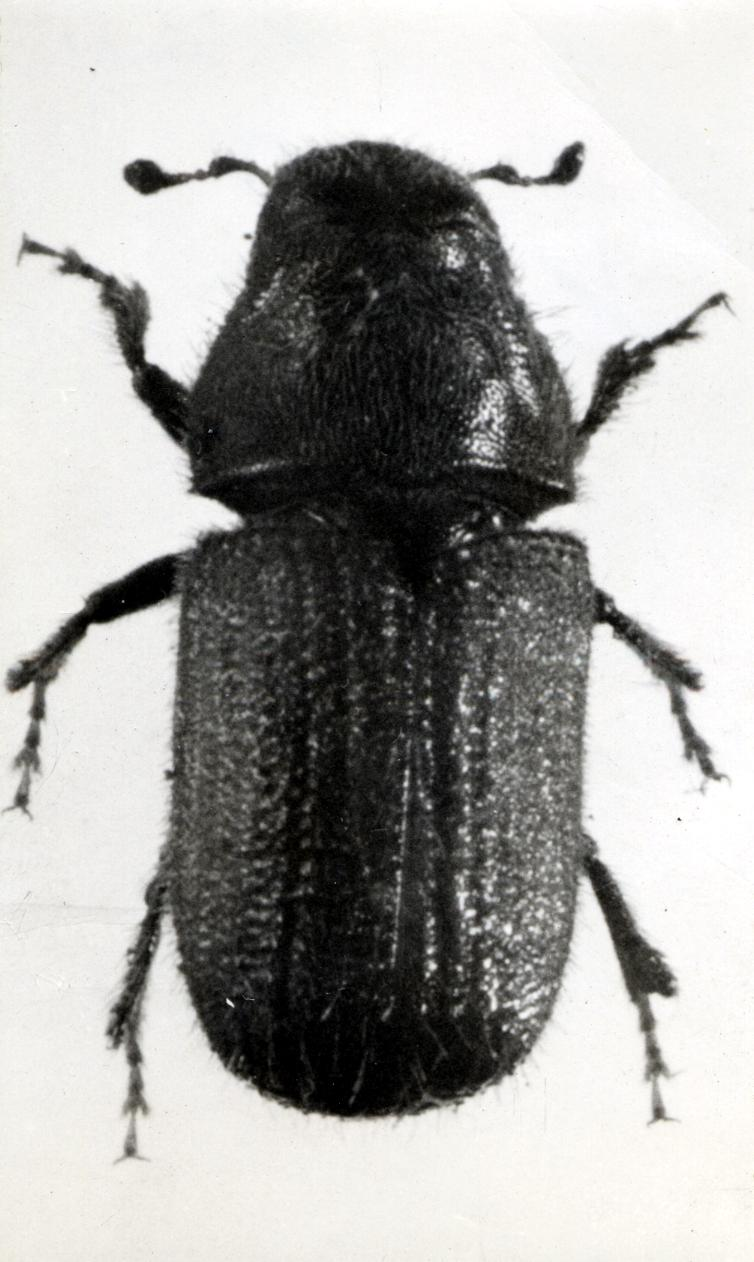

Scientific classification
- Domain: Eukaryota
- Kingdom: Animalia
- Phylum: Arthropoda
- Class: Insecta
- Order: Coleoptera
- Suborder: Polyphaga
- Infraorder: Cucujiformia
- Family: Curculionidae
- Genus: Dendroctonus
- Species: D. pseudotsugae

Binomial name
- Dendroctonus pseudotsugae Hopkins, 1905

= Dendroctonus pseudotsugae =

Species of beetle

Dendroctonus pseudotsugae, the Douglas-fir beetle, is a species of bark beetle found in western North America. Three subspecies exist that correspond to the subspecies of Douglas fir. The beetles also infest downed Larch trees. Outbreaks often occur in conjunction with drought, root rot diseases, overcrowding, damage by insects that damage foliage, and environmental disturbance. This insect is part of the western forest ecosystem, playing a role in thinning weak trees in a stand.

Adult Douglas-fir beetles are light brown when young and become dark brown or black with reddish wing covers. They are somewhat hairy and range in size from 4.4 to 7 mm. The larvae are small, legless, the size of grains of rice, and white. Pupae are white to cream colored. Visible evidence of infestation includes patches of orange to reddish-brown boring dust in the bark or at the base of the tree. Resin streamers from attacks higher in the tree may also be present. Inside the bark, 6 to 30 inch egg galleries run parallel with the grain. Eggs are laid on either side of the gallery and when they hatch, the larvae mine perpendicular to the galleries.
