= Ponticoccus marisrubri =

Ponticoccus

Scientific classification
- Domain: Bacteria
- Kingdom: Pseudomonadati
- Phylum: Pseudomonadota
- Class: Alphaproteobacteria
- Order: Rhodobacterales
- Family: Rhodobacteraceae
- Genus: Ponticoccus
- Species: P. marisrubri

Binomial name
- Ponticoccus marisrubri Zhang et al. 2017

Type strain
- ACCC19863, JCM 19520, SJ5A-1

Synonyms
- Ponticoccus brinium

Species of bacterium

Ponticoccus marisrubri is a Gram-negative, aerobic, moderately halophilic and non-motile bacterium from the genus Ponticoccus which has been isolated from seawater from the Erba Deep from the Red Sea.
