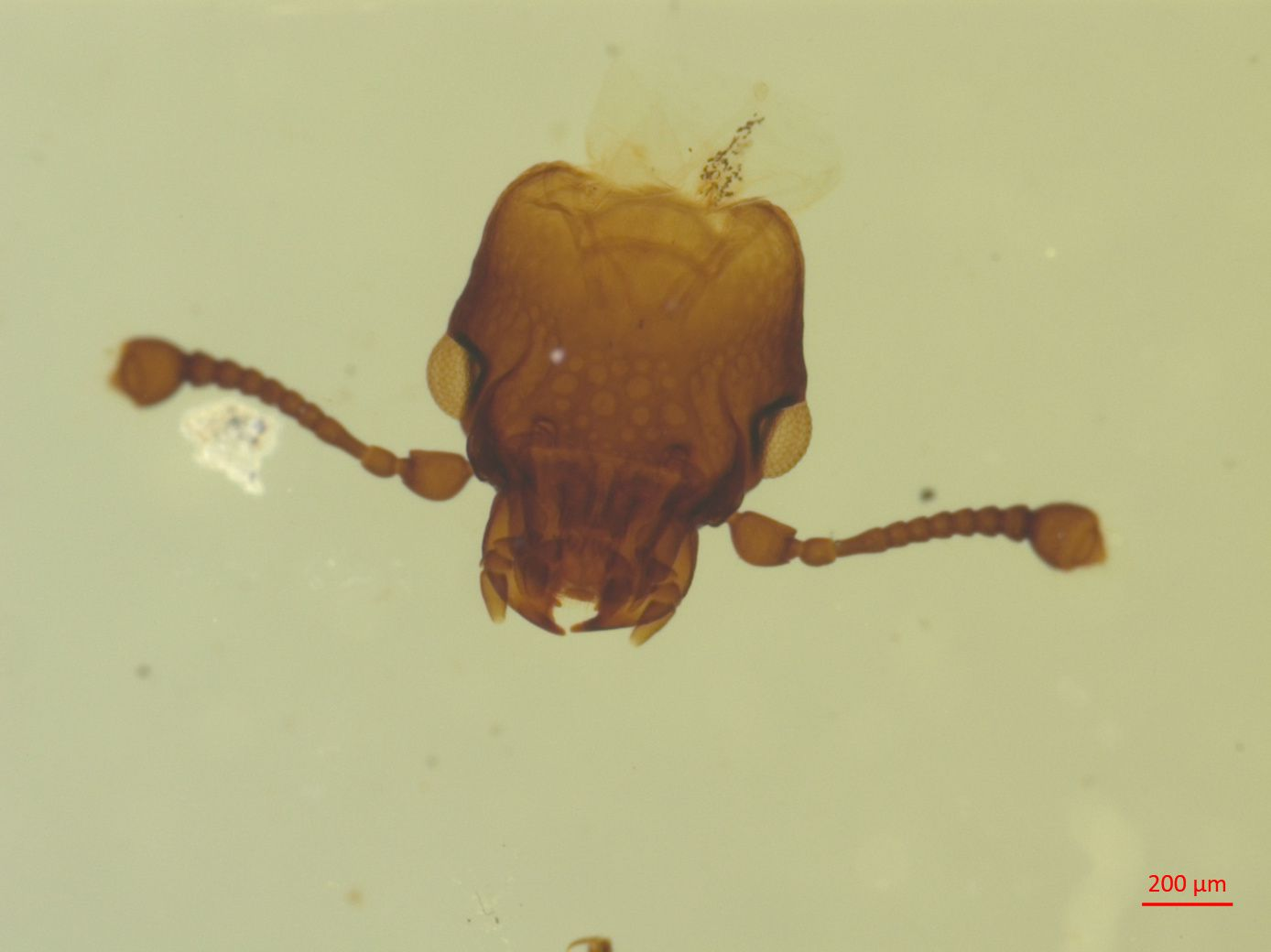
- Rhizophagus grandis head

Scientific classification
- Kingdom: Animalia
- Phylum: Arthropoda
- Class: Insecta
- Order: Coleoptera
- Suborder: Polyphaga
- Infraorder: Cucujiformia
- Family: Monotomidae
- Genus: Rhizophagus
- Species: R. grandis

Binomial name
- Rhizophagus grandis Gyllenhal, 1827

= Rhizophagus grandis =

Species of beetle

Rhizophagus grandis is a species of predatory beetle in the family Monotomidae. R. grandis is a specialist predator on the larvae of the great spruce bark beetle (Dendroctonus micans), a pest of spruce trees (Picea), and is found in Eurasian forests where its prey is found.

R. grandis spends its whole life in association with its prey, living underneath the bark of spruce trees. From multiple studies, it is proven that R. grandis disperse effectively fast in the environment to find their prey. They can range in over 200 meters of there release point to locate their prey. It is specifically attracted by volatile chemicals, monoterpenes, present in the frass produced by the bark beetle larvae as they tunnel under the bark of their host tree.

During the twentieth century, D. micans has been steadily increasing its range, and R. grandis has tended to follow. R. grandis was first introduced to Britain in 1983 and this is where it began its mass attacking on the D. micans. The effects of the predator were apparent when both spread into Germany around the beginning of the century, and after D. micans had invaded Georgia in the 1950s, the first programme for its biological control involving R. grandis was established there in 1963. Since then, rearing of the predatory beetle has been undertaken in Georgia, using cut logs infested with D. micans. When the pest species spread into Turkey, further biocontrol programmes were implemented in that country.

It has been found that R. grandis is also attracted to the frass produced by the black turpentine beetle (Dendroctonus terebrans) and the southern pine beetle (Dendroctonus frontalis), closely related bark boring beetles found in the United States. The larvae of D. frontalis are not gregarious, but those of D. terebrans are, and biological control of the latter pest by R. grandis may be possible. An attempt to do this was made when small numbers of the predator were imported from Belgium and released in Louisiana in 1988.
