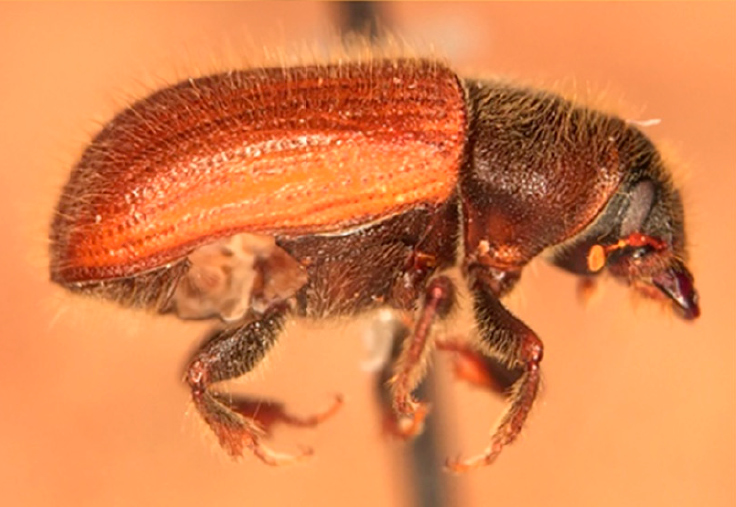

Scientific classification
- Kingdom: Animalia
- Phylum: Arthropoda
- Clade: Pancrustacea
- Class: Insecta
- Order: Coleoptera
- Suborder: Polyphaga
- Infraorder: Cucujiformia
- Family: Curculionidae
- Genus: Dendroctonus
- Species: D. murrayanae

Binomial name
- Dendroctonus murrayanae Hopkins, 1909

= Dendroctonus murrayanae =

Species of beetle

Dendroctonus murrayanae, the lodgepole pine beetle, is a species of crenulate bark beetle in the family Curculionidae. It is found in North America.
