= Ponticoccus =

Scientific classification
- Domain: Bacteria
- Kingdom: Pseudomonadati
- Phylum: Pseudomonadota
- Class: Alphaproteobacteria
- Order: Rhodobacterales
- Family: Rhodobacteraceae
- Genus: Ponticoccus; Hwang and Cho 2008

Type species
- Ponticoccus litoralis

Species
- P. lacteus P. gilvus P. litoralis P. marisrubri

Genus of bacteria

Ponticoccus is a bacterial genus from the family Roseobacteraceae.
