= Dendroctonus jeffreyi =

Scientific classification
- Kingdom: Animalia
- Phylum: Arthropoda
- Clade: Pancrustacea
- Class: Insecta
- Order: Coleoptera
- Suborder: Polyphaga
- Infraorder: Cucujiformia
- Family: Curculionidae
- Genus: Dendroctonus
- Species: D. jeffreyi

Binomial name
- Dendroctonus jeffreyi Hopkins, 1909

Species of beetle

Dendroctonus jeffreyi, known generally as the Jeffrey pine beetle or mountain pine beetle, is a species of crenulate bark beetle in the family Curculionidae. It is found in North America. The Jeffrey pine beetle is monophagous on the Jeffrey pine tree, a dominant yellow pine and most concentrated in areas ranging from Southwestern Oregon to Baja California to western Nevada. In its native range, it causes a significant amount of damage as large numbers of tree mortality have been documented. It is known to cause significant changes to the composition and structure of the Jeffrey pine tree.
