= Ponticoccus gilvus =

Ponticoccus

Scientific classification
- Domain: Bacteria
- Kingdom: Pseudomonadati
- Phylum: Pseudomonadota
- Class: Alphaproteobacteria
- Order: Rhodobacterales
- Family: Rhodobacteraceae
- Genus: Ponticoccus
- Species: P. gilvus

Binomial name
- Ponticoccus gilvus Lee and Lee 2008

Type strain
- DSM 21351, KCTC 19476, MSW-19

Species of bacterium

Ponticoccus gilvus is a Gram-positive, aerobic, non-spore-forming and non-motile bacterium from the genus Ponticoccus which has been isolated from seawater from the Mara Island on Korea.
