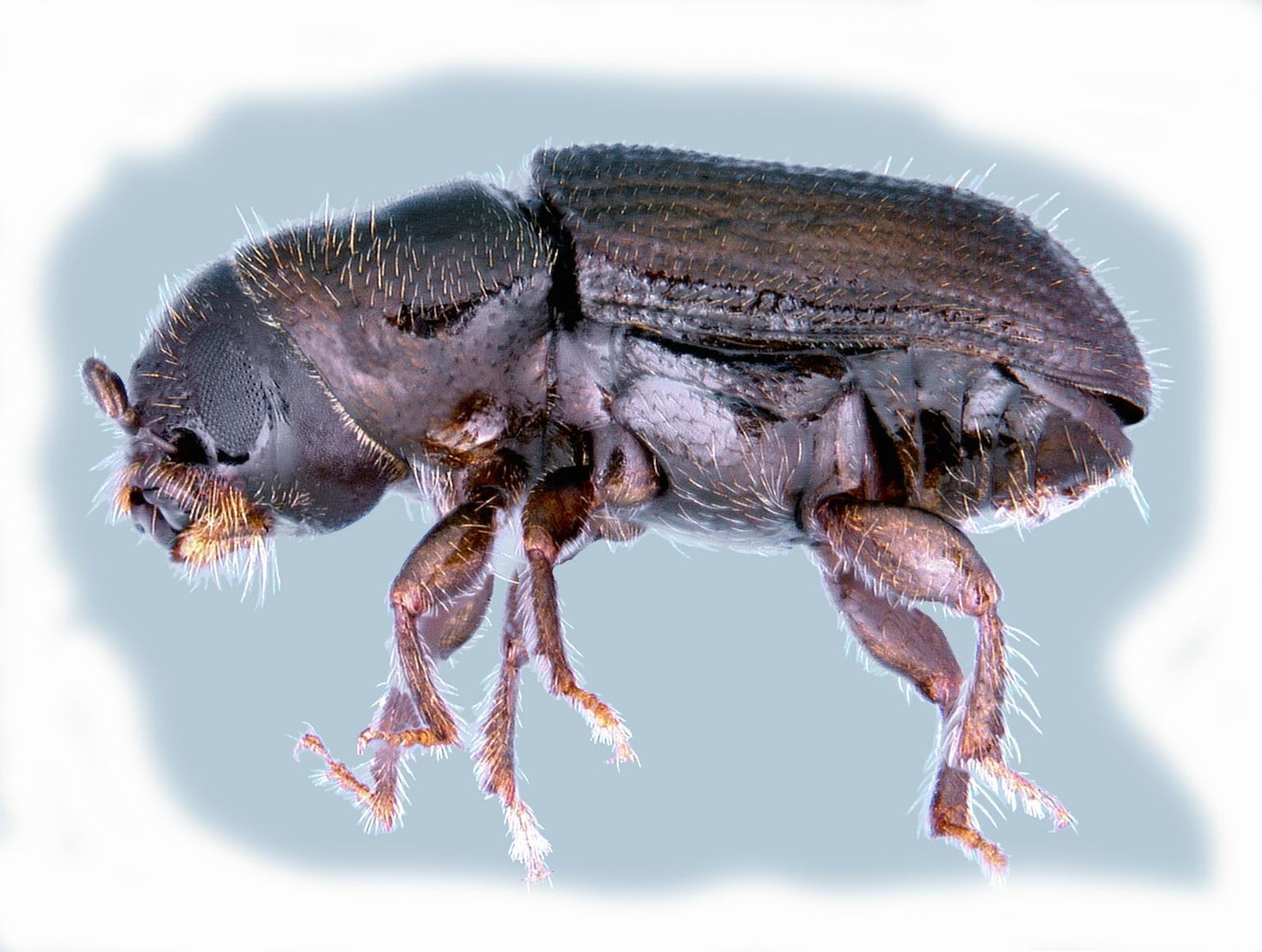

Scientific classification
- Kingdom: Animalia
- Phylum: Arthropoda
- Clade: Pancrustacea
- Class: Insecta
- Order: Coleoptera
- Suborder: Polyphaga
- Infraorder: Cucujiformia
- Family: Curculionidae
- Genus: Dendroctonus
- Species: D. frontalis

Binomial name
- Dendroctonus frontalis Zimmermann, 1868

Synonyms
- Dendroctonus arizonicus

= Dendroctonus frontalis =

Species of beetle

Dendroctonus frontalis, the southern pine beetle, often shortened to simply SPB, is a species of bark beetle native to the forests of the southern United States, Mexico and Central America. It has recently expanded its range to the northeastern United States, where it is considered an invasive species and has destroyed massive amounts of pine forest.

== Description ==
The southern pine beetle has a reddish brown to black exoskeleton and measures approximately 3 mm (0.12 in), about the size of a grain of rice. It is short-legged; the front of the male's head is notched, and the female possesses a wide elevated transverse ridge, and the hind abdomen of both is round.

== Tree infestations ==
Dendroctonus frontalis inhabits several Pinus species. Host trees in the United States include primarily P. taeda (loblolly pine), P. echinata (shortleaf pine), P. elliottii (slash pine), P. virginiana (Virginia pine), P. rigida ( pitch pine), P. palustris (longleaf pine ), P. serotina (pond pine), P. pungens (table mountain pine), P. strobus (eastern white pine), P. ponderosa (ponderosa pine), P. engelmannii (Apache pine) and P. leiophylla (Chihuahua pine). Host trees in Central America include P. caribaea (Caribbean pine), P. engelmannii, P. leiophylla, P. maximinoi (thinleaf pine), and P. oocarpa (ocote). In the southeastern United States, it is considered one of the most important causes of economic loss in forestry. About $900 million worth of damage was caused by this species from 1960 to 1990 in the southern United States.

== Chemical behavior ==
The chemical behavior of the southern pine beetle starts with a chemical presented by the female that is a communicator, attracting both male and female individuals to that tree. This attraction is known as an aggregation pheromone which presents a sensor behavior for communities of SPBs to the area, causing an infestation of pine trees in the Southeastern U.S.

== Selection of host trees, damaged, attractions, and attacks ==
When a tree or area of trees are selected for attack, a host tree is generally selected by a female SPB, which she then colonizes. The host is usually a pine tree that is or has been stressed or damaged from natural disasters such as tornados and heavy winds, and/or areas where there may be a lack of thinning due to fire suppression. Once SPBs are summoned to an area by the pheromone issued the female SPB, pines are attacked and continuously destroyed.

The female southern pine beetle has been known to select host pine trees as the initial attack. The selected pine tree becomes a host site for the female SPBs to lay their eggs. A combination of the female SPB pheromone (frontalin, which increases with the effectiveness of trans-verbenol) also produced by the female SPB) and the resin from the pine tree of selection, initiate infestations and send chemical signals for all other SPBs to join. When the female SPB drills within the bark of these pine trees, she creates pitch tubes. These pitch tubes cause the resin from the pine tree to begin to release as a thick, sticky, odorous, white color and has the appearance of popcorn on the outer back. By drilling through the inner bark, the natural food supply of these pine trees is cut off by the female SPB, creating niches within the phloem of the tree to deposit her eggs. The drilling of these pitch holes interrupts the water supply, limiting the trees' life functioning cycle such as photosynthesis. The food supply that the phloem provides releases an aggregation pheromone known as frontalin. The host trees selected by the female SPB in the southeastern part of the US are preferably loblolly pine tree stands or conifer trees. The female deposits her eggs after the release of her chemical pheromone within the bark of the tree. Once this chemical aggregate is detected, other male and female SPBs are signaled. Once other beetles arrive, individual trees are selected for continuous pheromones and host chemical orders are initiators in the selection of other nearby trees as hosts using an infestation to colonize.

== Frontalin, Trans-verbenol, Endo-brevicomin ==
Frontalin IUPAC:(1S,5R)-1,5-dimethyl-6,8-dioxabicyclo[3.2.1]octane) and trans-verbenol are a phenome of the female southern pine beetle, while endo-brevicomin is a phenome of the male SPB. These pheromones are used as signals in general attacks by SPB of many forests in the U.S. and other countries.
