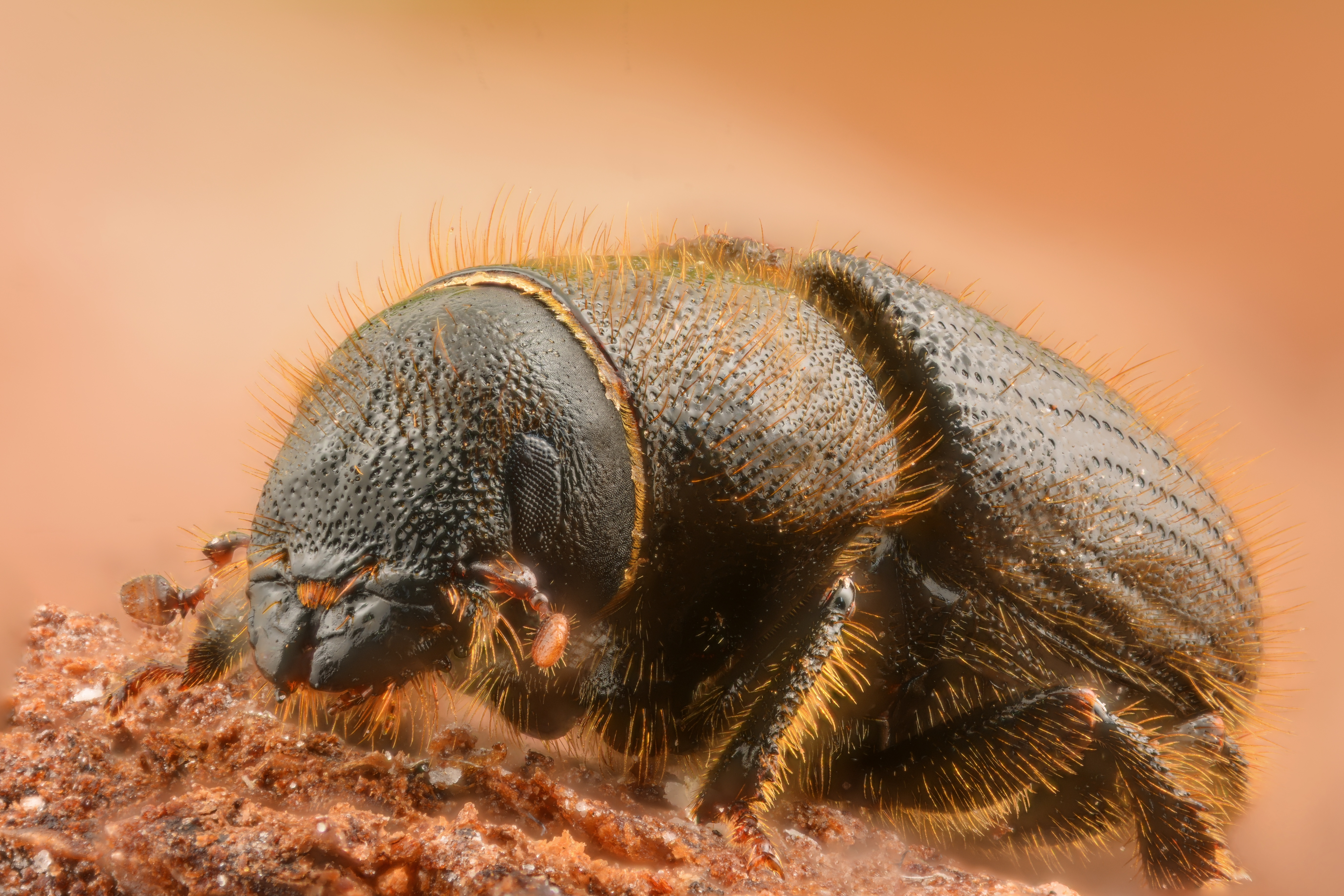

Scientific classification
- Kingdom: Animalia
- Phylum: Arthropoda
- Clade: Pancrustacea
- Class: Insecta
- Order: Coleoptera
- Suborder: Polyphaga
- Infraorder: Cucujiformia
- Superfamily: Curculionoidea
- Family: Curculionidae
- Subfamily: Scolytinae
- Genus: Dendroctonus
- Species: D. micans

Binomial name
- Dendroctonus micans (Kugelann, 1794)

= Great spruce bark beetle =

Species of beetle

The great spruce bark beetle, Dendroctonus micans, is a species of bark beetle native to the coniferous forests of Europe and Asia. The beetles attack economically important spruce species including Picea abies (Norway spruce) and Picea sitchensis (Sitka spruce). The adults burrow into the bark of the trees and lay eggs there. The larvae feed on the phloem under the bark; they can girdle the tree if present in large enough numbers.

The species is a serious pest of commercial forestry, and is an invasive species in many regions where it is not native, such as the United Kingdom, France, Turkey, Georgia, and North America. While its main host is spruce, it also attacks coniferous trees of other genera, including firs such as Abies sibirica (Siberian fir); pines such as Pinus sylvestris (Scots pine); the Douglas-fir Pseudotsuga menziesii, and the common larch, Larix decidua. Biological pest control has been applied using a natural predator, the beetle Rhizophagus grandis, in several countries.

== Description ==
The eggs of the great spruce bark beetle are smooth, white and translucent. These eggs are often laid in batches of a hundred or more. The larvae are legless and C-shaped, white with darker heads. They are about 5 mm (0.2 in) long when mature. The pupae are white and "mummy-like"; they are exarate, with legs and wings separate from the body. The adults are between 6 and 9 mm (0.24 and 0.35 in) long and are cylindrical in shape and dark brown in colour. The limbs and antennae are yellowish-brown, the head is visible when viewed from above, and the elytral declivity, the downward sloping rear end of the elytra, is rounded and smooth.

== Taxonomy ==
The species was described scientifically in 1794 by the German pharmacist and entomologist Johann Gottlieb Kugelann, who named it Bostrichus micans; the specific name micans is Latin for "twinkling, shining". In 1813, the Swedish nobleman and entomologist Leonard Gyllenhaal also described the insect, naming it Hylesinus ligniperda. In 1836, the German doctor and entomologist Wilhelm Ferdinand Erichson gave the genus its accepted name Dendroctonus. This New Latin name is derived from Ancient Greek δένδρον dendron "tree", and κτόνος ktonos "murder", alluding to its ability to kill trees.

== Distribution ==
Dendroctonus micans distribution map

The great spruce bark beetle lives in coniferous forests of Europe and Asia. It is not clear where it originated and to which countries it is endemic, but it has been steadily expanding its range westward in Europe through the 20th and 21st centuries, assisted by the transport of unprocessed logs. It is present in most of Northern, Eastern and Central Europe and has reached Belgium and France, and was first detected in the United Kingdom in 1982. In Asia, it is present in Hokkaido in Japan, and in the Chinese provinces of Heilongjiang, Liaoning, Qinghai and Sichuan. It has been introduced into Turkey and Georgia, in both of which it is invasive. The beetle is established an invasive species in North America including the Pacific Northwest and the Canadian Rockies and it is expected to expand its range further.

== Life cycle ==
The female beetle excavates a tunnel in the bark of a host tree and creates a brood chamber. Any resin that accumulates is mixed with frass (droppings) and pushed out of the tunnel, creating a purplish-brown mass known as a resin tube. A hundred or more eggs are laid in the brood chamber and the female moves on, either creating another brood chamber near the first or exiting the tree and starting again. When the eggs hatch, the larvae feed gregariously, chewing their way in a broad front through the phloem and packing in their frass behind them. There are five larval instars and when the larvae are fully developed, they create individual pupal chambers in the frass and pupate. The total development time varies with temperature and may be one to three years. The new adults may stay under the bark, mining new tunnels and creating new brood chambers, or they may emerge into the open air. Several females may mine the same area and their excavations may coalesce.

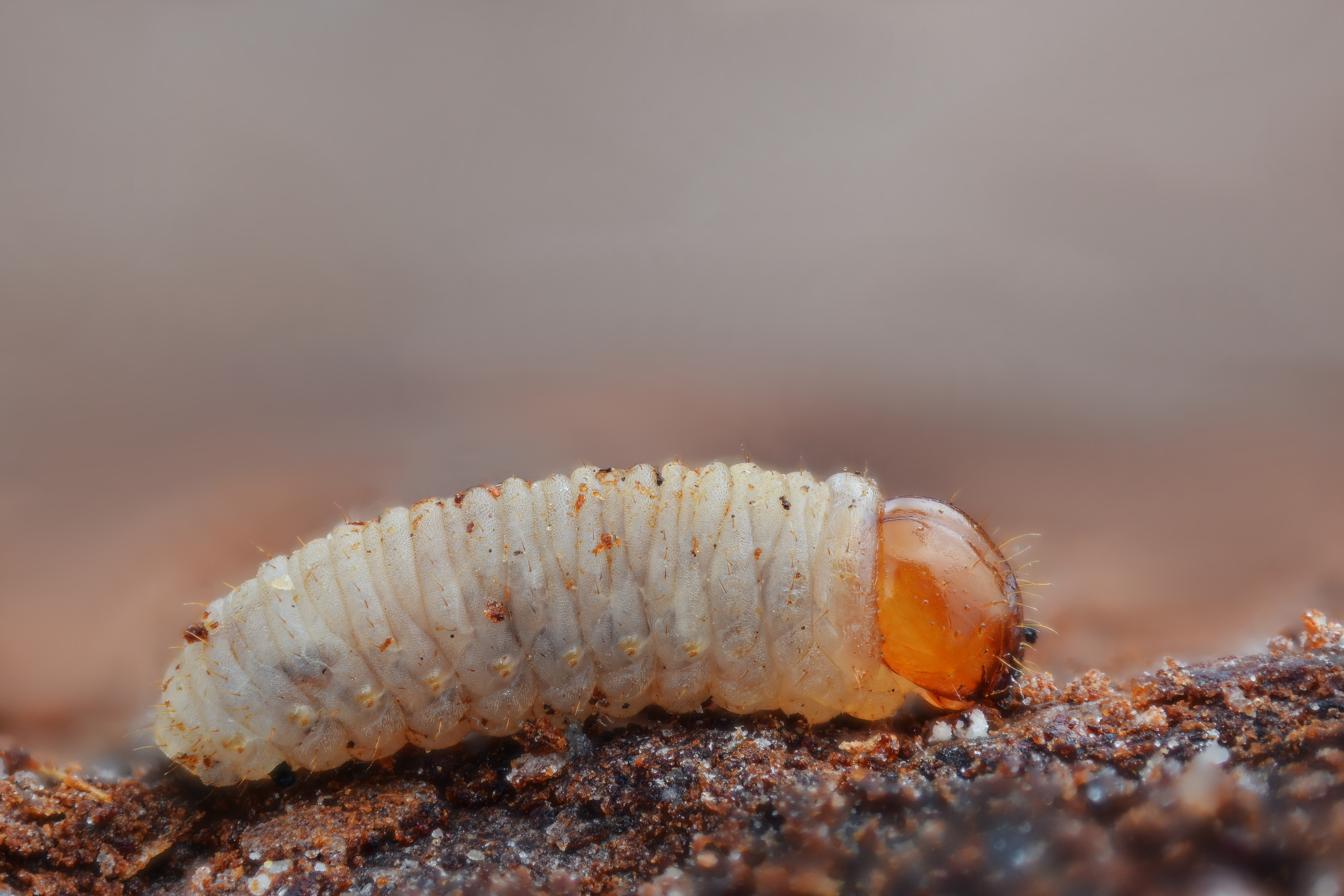
Larva

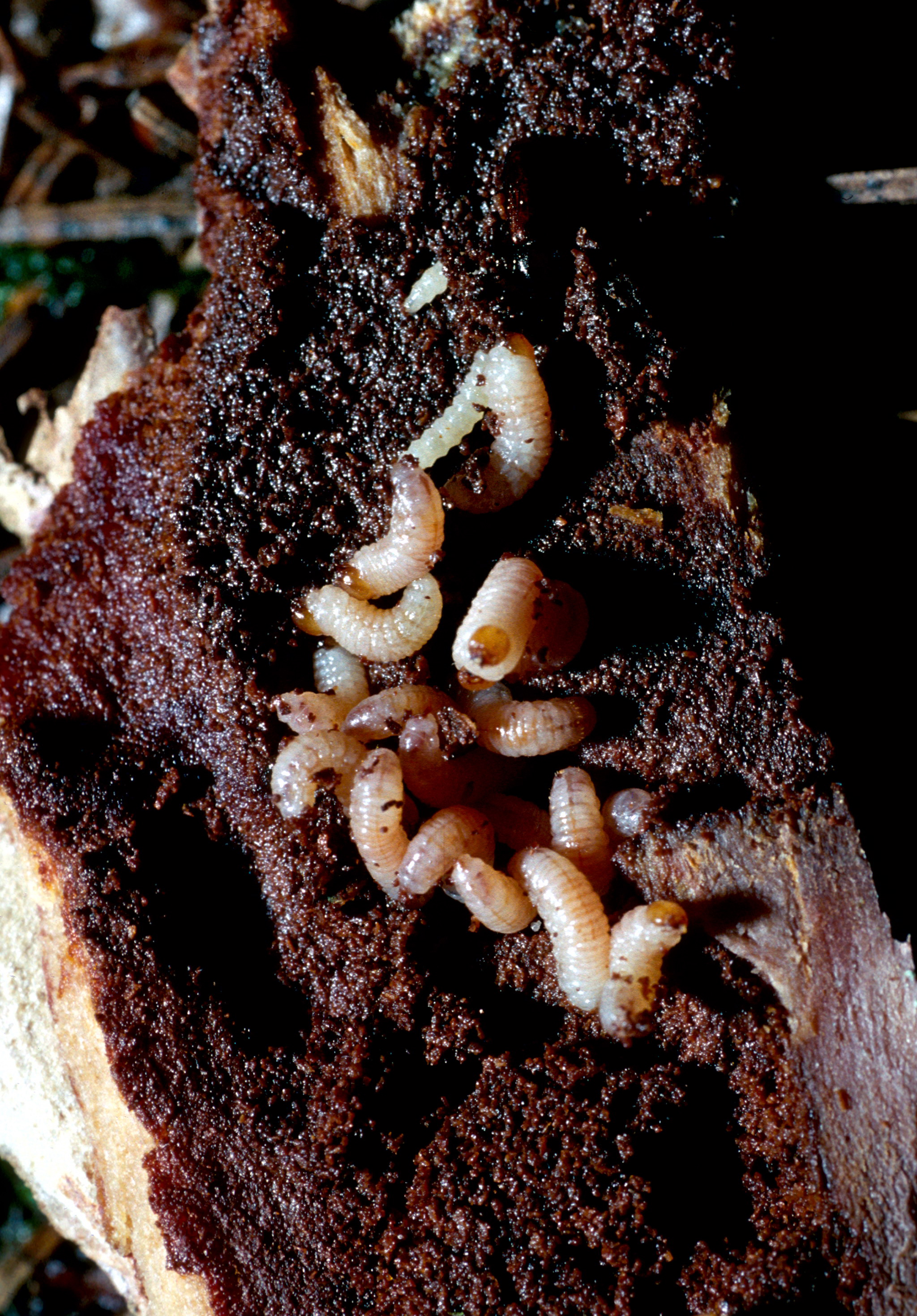
Larvae in gallery, with dark frass

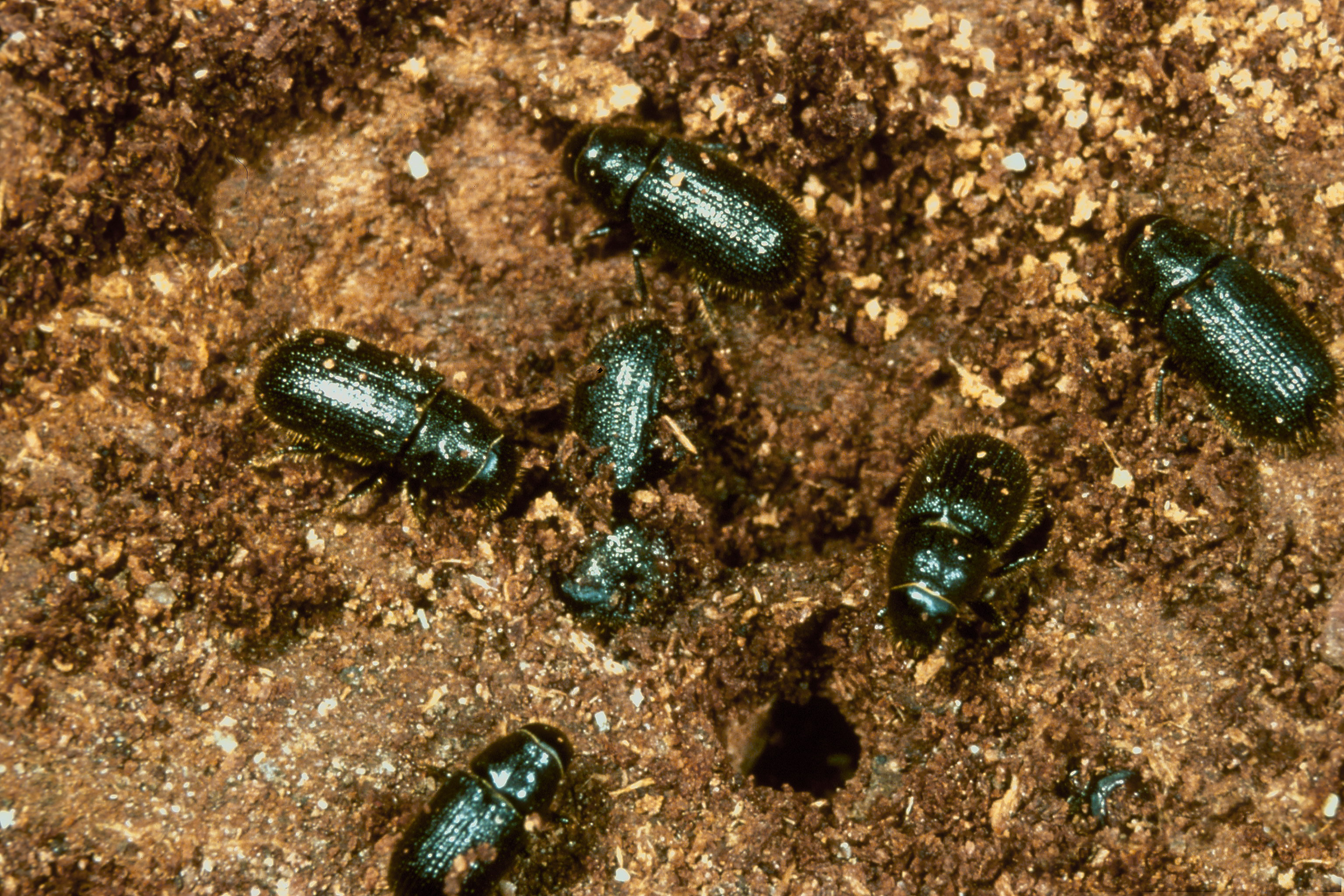
Adults under bark of Norway spruce, Picea abies

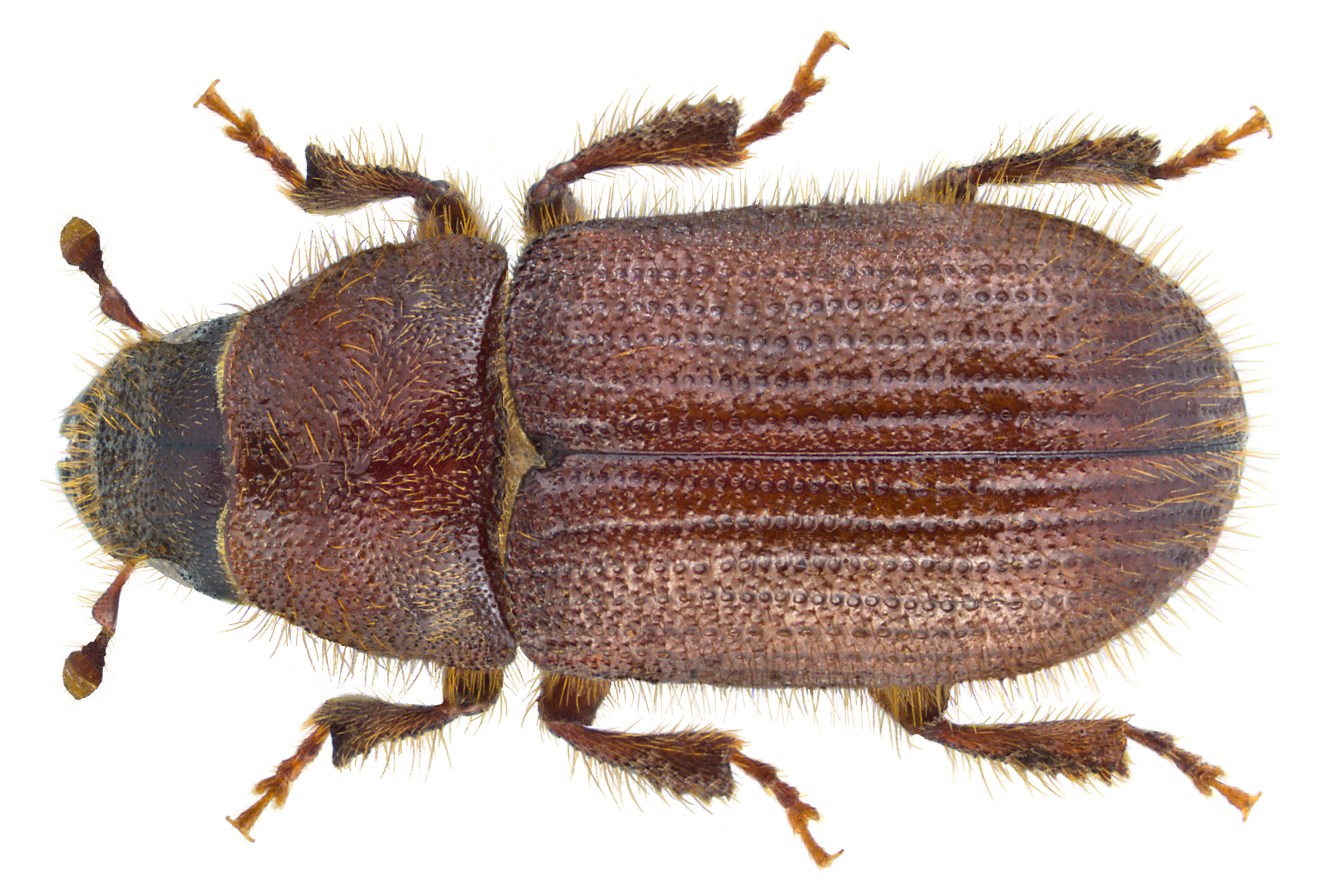
Adult

== Ecology ==
The great spruce bark beetle is unusual among members of its genus in that the beetles mate before they emerge from under the bark, while they are not yet fully chitinised. There are many more female than male beetles, often 10/1 but exceptionally 45/1, and the matings are normally incestuous, being between siblings. The beetles emerge into the open air through a round hole which may be used by many beetles. They are weak fliers and often disperse by walking, tunnelling into a different part of the same tree. Others fly to nearby trees, and small groups of trees may be affected. Each tree is weakened by the tunnelling activities of the beetles and larvae; this kills the bark in a limited area, and it may be five to eight years before the tree is girdled and dies. The beetle can seriously damage commercial forestry. It does not tunnel into the wood (xylem) beneath the bark, so the timber of a weakened but still living tree can be cut and used.

The beetle can attack many coniferous hosts, especially spruces such as Picea abies (Norway spruce) and Picea sitchensis (Sitka spruce); but also trees of several other genera, including firs such as Abies sibirica (Siberian fir); pines such as Pinus sylvestris (Scots pine); the Douglas-fir Pseudotsuga menziesii, and the common larch, Larix decidua.

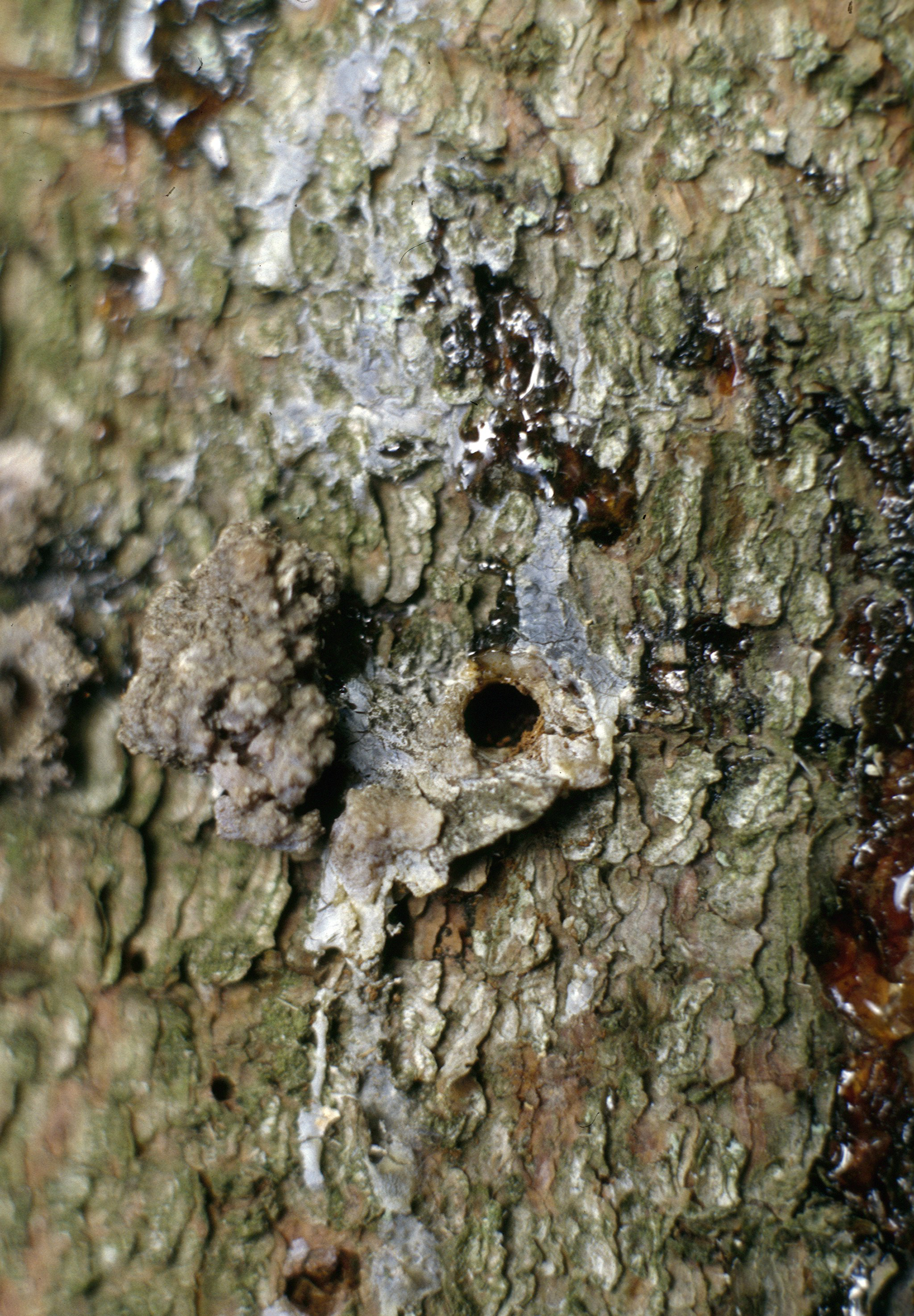
Visible damage on the outside of an affected tree, with exit hole and resin

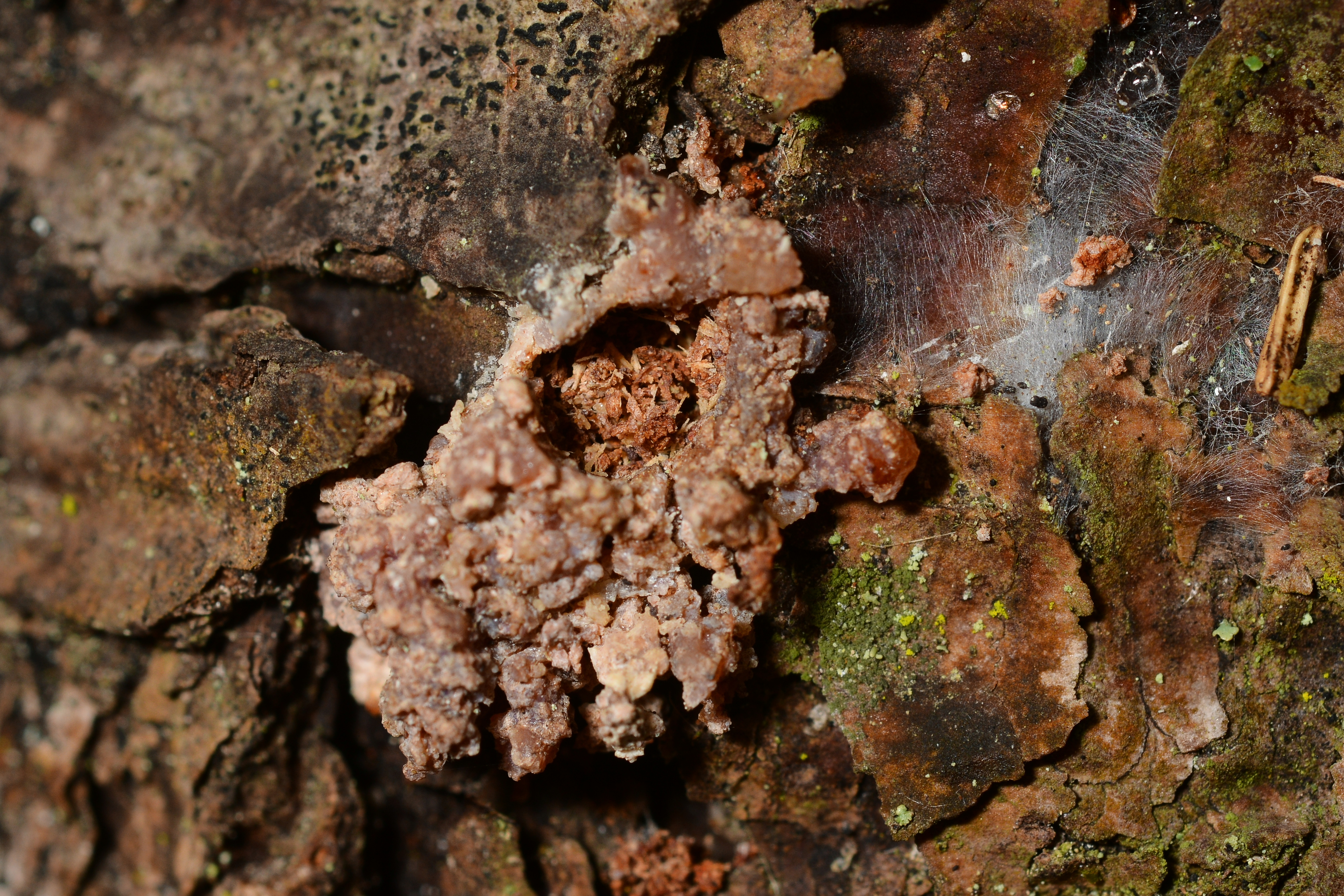
Resin tube with frass pushed out of exit hole

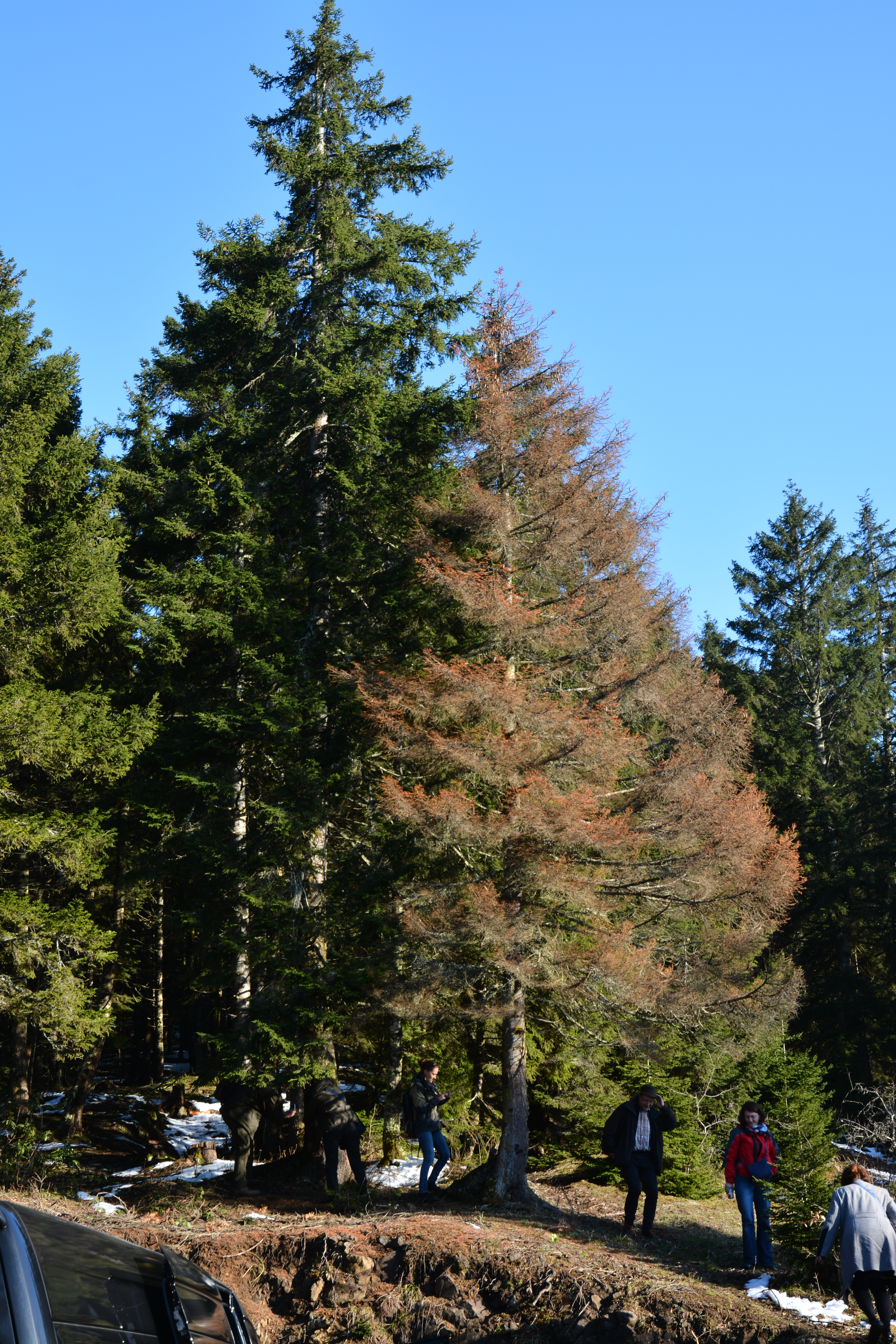
Oriental spruce killed by the beetle

== Pest control ==
Biological pest control was attempted in Georgia in the Soviet Union in 1963. The pest had accidentally been imported in timber, but its natural enemies had not. The predatory beetle Rhizophagus grandis was introduced and used on a large scale, seemingly successfully. A similar effort using the same predator was made in France's Massif Central region in the 1970s, and again in the United Kingdom in the 1980s. The predator is attracted to the frass produced by its prey which contains monoterpenes; a suitable mixture of synthetic monoterpenes has been used to trap R. grandis in its native range, to provide insects for use as a control agent. A rearing and release programme was undertaken, and between 1984 and 1995, over 150,000 R. grandis beetles were released in over two thousand sites in northwestern England and Wales, with surrounding areas of forest being quarantined.

== See also ==
- Ips typographus, the European spruce bark beetle
