= Ponderosa pine forest =

Plant community where Pinus ponderosa is common

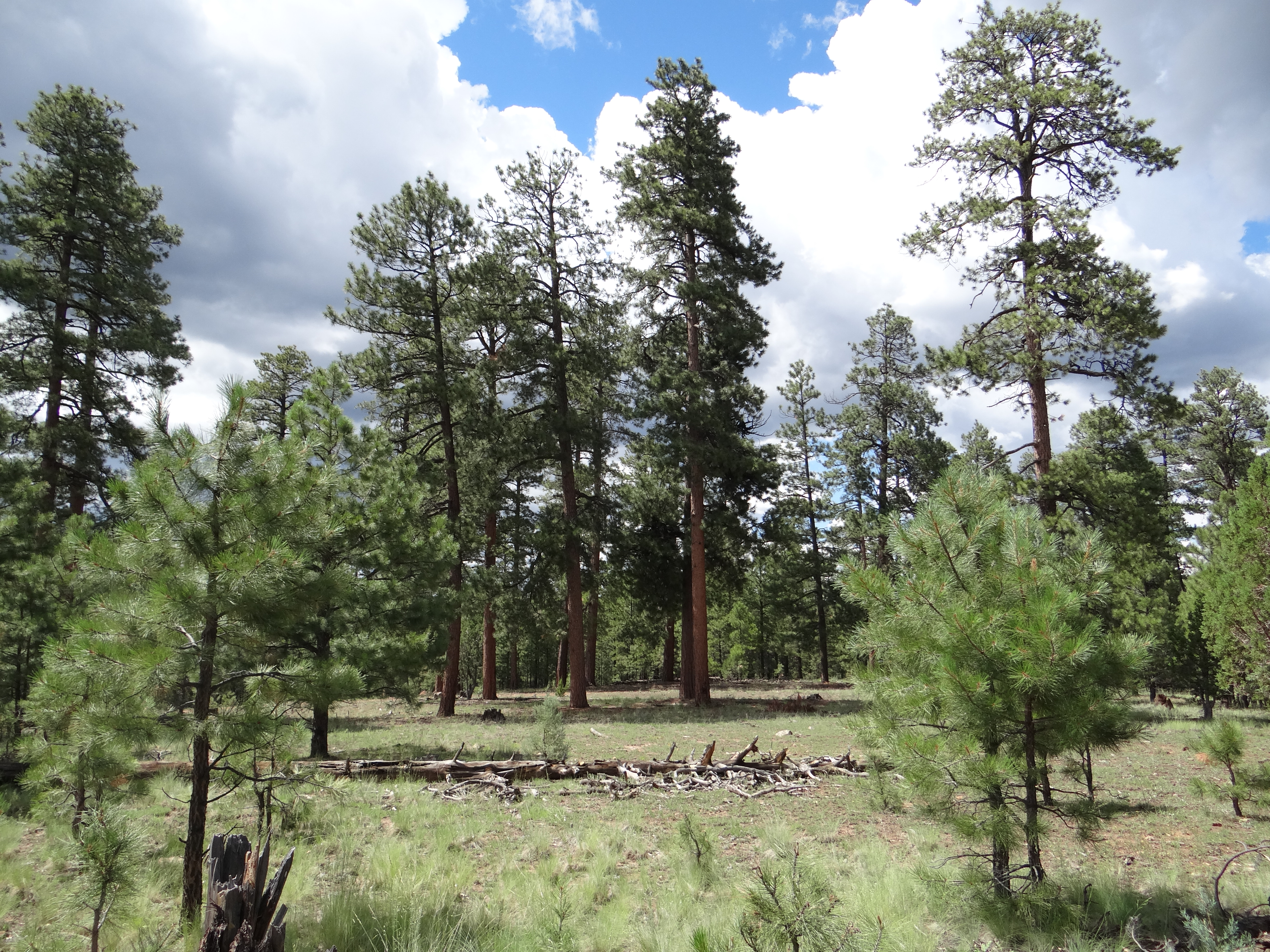
Ponderosa forest near Forest Lakes, Arizona

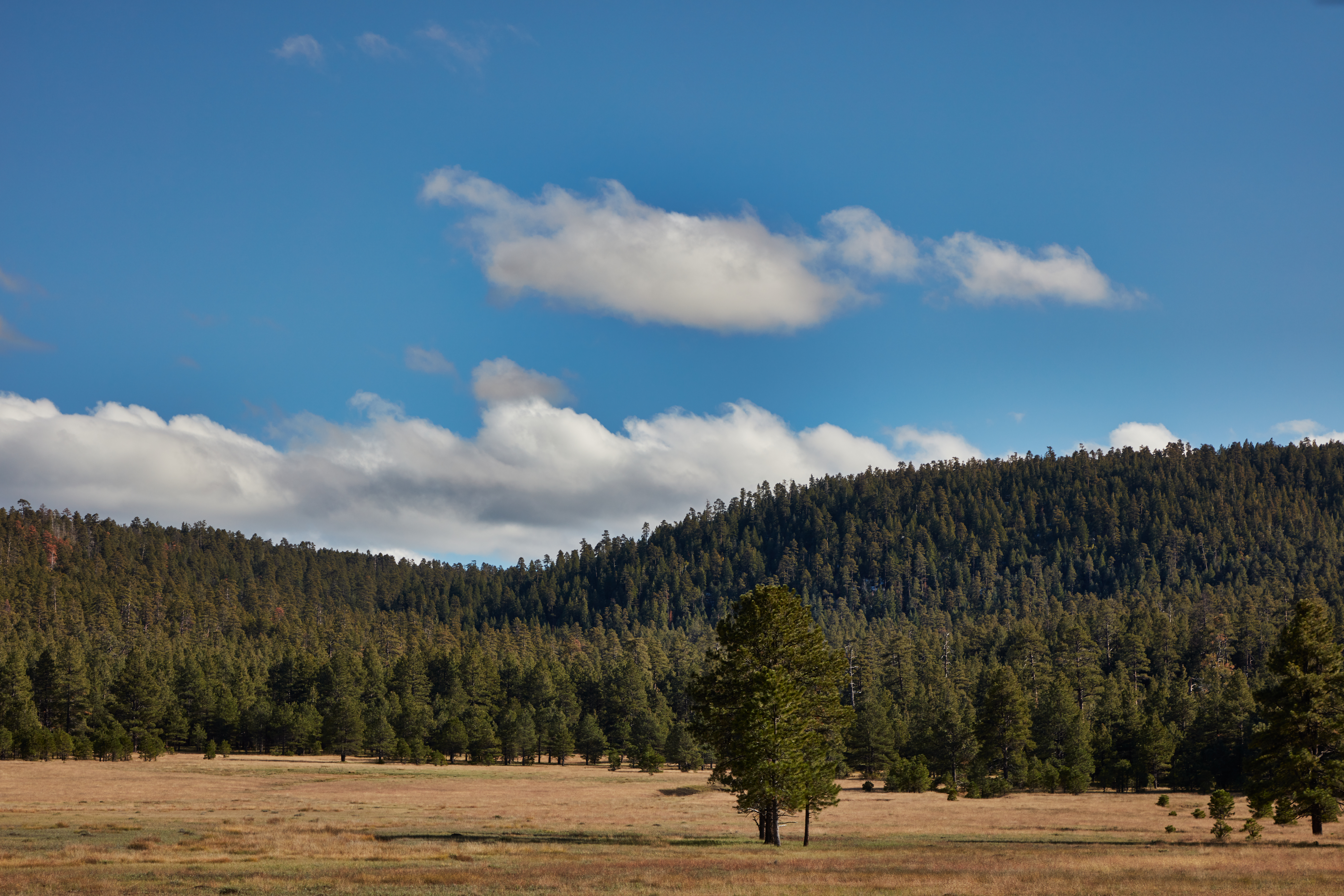
Ponderosa forest near Mormon Lake, Arizona

Ponderosa pine forest is a plant association and plant community dominated by ponderosa pine and found in western North America. It is found from the British Columbia to Durango, Mexico. In the south and east, ponderosa pine forest is the climax forest, while in the more northern part of its range, it can transition to Douglas-fir or grand fir, or white fir forests. Understory species depends on location. Fire suppression has led to insect outbreaks in ponderosa pine forests.

== Physiography ==
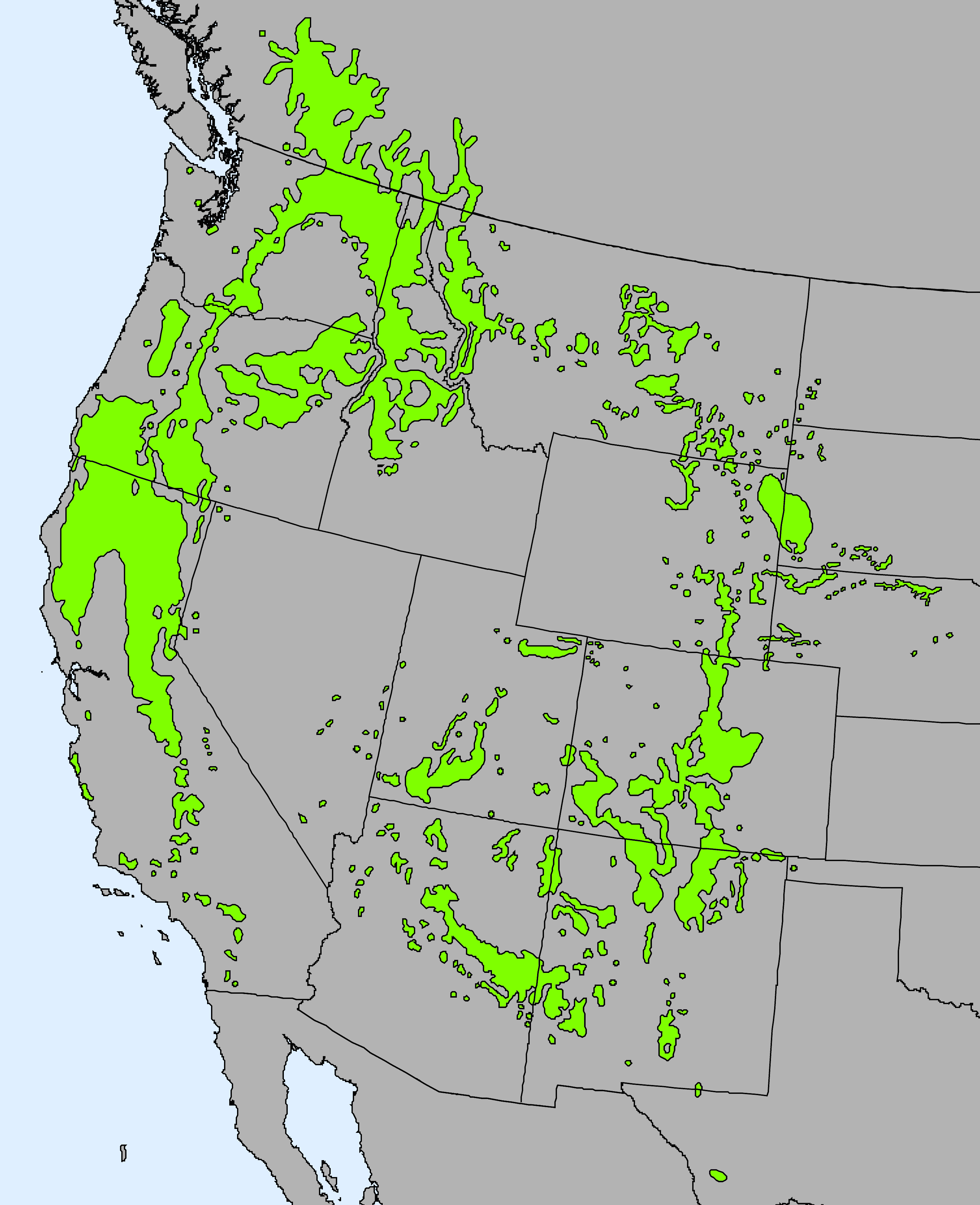
Range map of ponderosa pine

Ponderosa pine forest is the largest western forest type in the United States. Ponderosa pine is the principal species on over 110,000 km^{2} (27,000,000 acres) and is present on an additional 55,000 km^{2} (14,000,000 acres). Within the western United States, California alone contains the greatest concentrations of ponderosa pine (20,700 km^{2} or 5,100,000 acres) closely followed by Oregon with 19,000 km^{2} (4,700,000 acres) and, when combined, Arizona and New Mexico contain an additional 25,000 km^{2} (6,200,000 acres) of ponderosa pine.

Since ponderosa pine has a rather wide range of adaptability and can dominate some of the less mesic true forest sites, it occupies low mountains and foothills in many places; yet in mixtures with other species, it is found at moderate elevations.

Local topography can be gentle, as on plateau tops and low mountains, or it can be steep, as on canyon walls and faces. Semiarid, low mountain sites are common, but it is difficult to characterize the physiography of the ecosystem because it varies greatly.

== Climate ==
Ponderosa pine forest occurs when the average mean temperature is between 42 and 50 °F (6 and 10 °C) and the July/August mean temperature is 62 to 70 °F (17 to 21 °C).

The length of the frost-free season at any location in the ecosystem depends largely upon the latitude and elevation. In general, in much of the northern area the frost-free period is 120 days, whereas in many foothill areas and in parts of the Sierra Nevada and the Gila Wilderness in Arizona, it can be 240 days. Annual precipitation is about 15 to 20 inches (380 to 510 mm) in the more pure pine areas, but where there are combinations of pine and other conifers at moderate elevations, the precipitation can total 30 inches (760 mm). In the far western sector, only 25 percent of this moisture falls in the warmest months. In the Northern Rocky Mountains, 40-50 percent of the precipitation occurs in the warmest months. In the middle to southern Rockies, 66 to 75 percent occurs in the warmest months. In the southern areas and those at low elevations, precipitation during the frost-free season is only 20 percent of the evaporation potential. In northern areas precipitation during the growing season may be as high as 40 percent of the evaporation potential.

== Vegetation ==
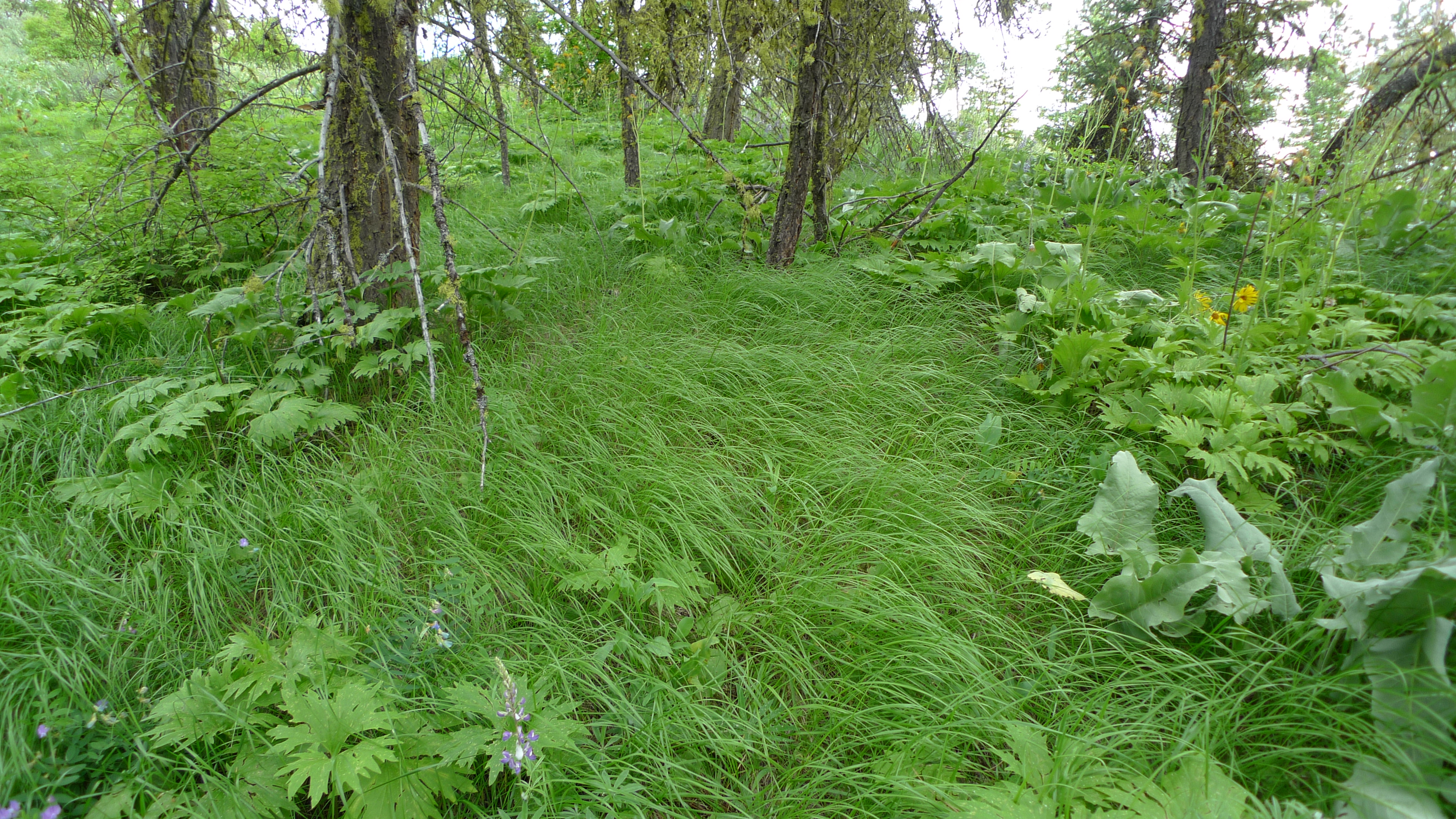
Calamagrostis rubescens can aggressively compete with ponderosa pine seedlings

Ponderosa pine forest can occur in different types of ecological site. Each of these sites can be characterized by its potential vegetation type (PVT) after succession reaches equilibrium or climax community.

In the southern and extreme eastern portion of the range, ponderosa pine grows primarily on ponderosa pine PVTs. On these settings, quaking aspen is the most frequent early-seral tree species. Ground-level vegetation includes oaks (Quercus spp.), grasses (Festuca and Andropogon spp.), and low shrubs (e.g., snowberry (Symphoricarpos spp.) and spirea (Spirea spp.)). Russet buffaloberry (Shepherdia canadensis), a frequent shrub in these forests, stands out for its nitrogen fixing properties which is the process of making elemental nitrogen in the atmosphere available to plants.

With increasing moisture, ponderosa pine occurs as a mid-seral species and Douglas-fir becomes the late-seral species (Douglas-fir PVT). Quaking aspen and lodgepole pine are early-seral associates of ponderosa pine on these sites. These ponderosa pine forests occur in the Rocky Mountains along the Front Range of Colorado, in Utah, and in southern Idaho. They also occur along the western slopes of the Sierra Nevadas in California and the eastern slopes of the Cascades in Oregon. Ground-level vegetation includes ninebark (Physocarpus spp.), elk sedge (Carex geyeri), and pine grass (Calamagrostis rubescens). These species, in particular, exemplify aggressive survivors after disturbance (e.g., fire, mechanical site preparation) and are strong competitors for light and nutrients which compete with ponderosa pine seedlings.

Ponderosa pine forests in the north can occur in dry forests where the grand fir or white fir are the climax species. Additional trees that can occur in such forests include juniper (Juniperus spp.), pinyon pine (Pinus edulis), sugar pine (Pinus lambertiana), incense-cedar (Calocedrus decurrens), western larch, Jeffrey pine (Pinus jeffreyi), and lodgepole pine. Pinegrass and ninebark are frequent associates, but tall shrubs such as Rocky Mountain maple (Acer glabrum) often occur.

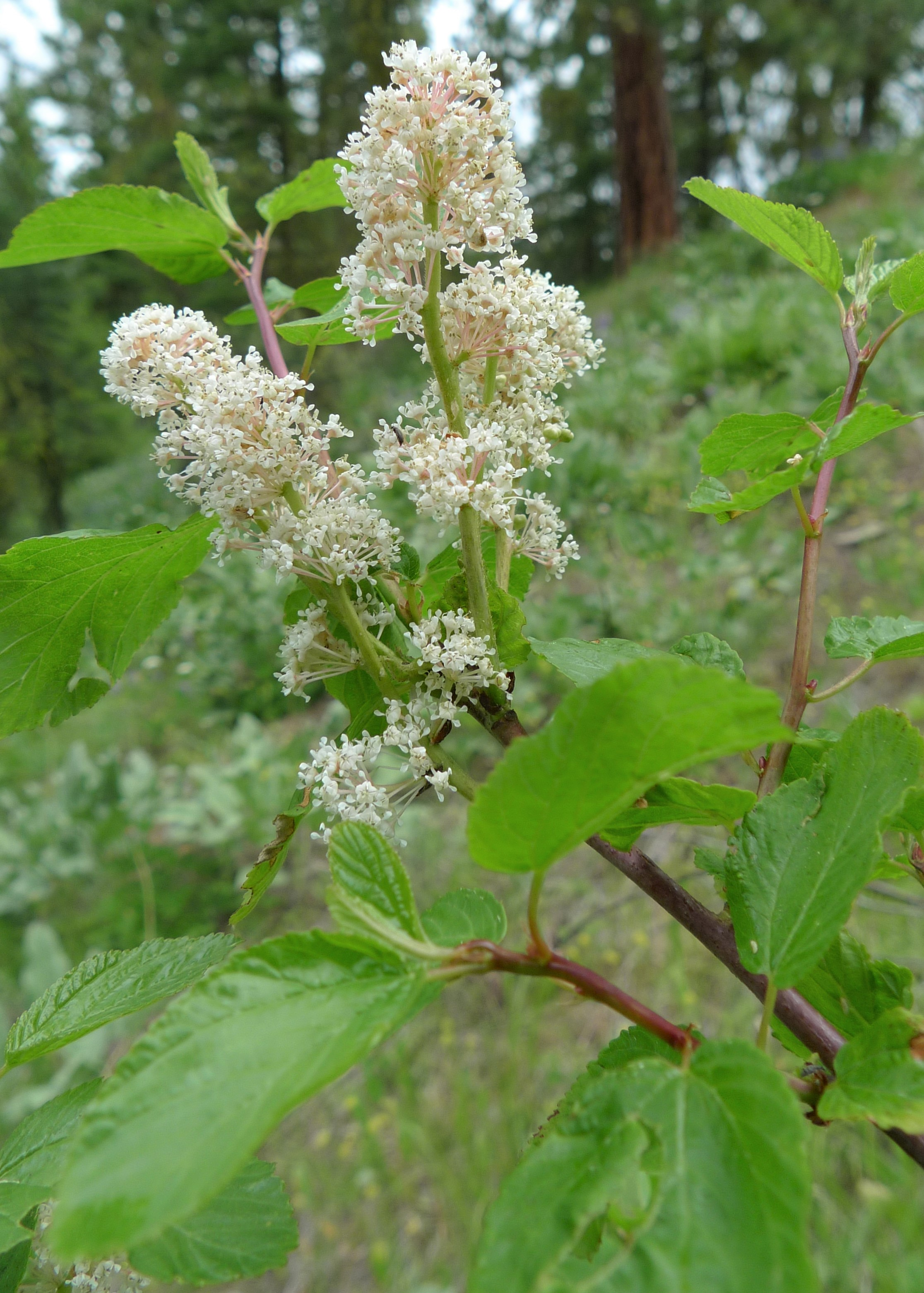
Ceanothus sanguineus grows in the understory of some ponderosa pine forests

The wettest forests where ponderosa pine occurs are the wet grand fir and/or white fir PVTs and the driest western redcedar PVTs. Such forests occur in the interior northwestern United States and in southern British Columbia. The western redcedar PVT is by far the most productive type on which ponderosa pine occurs, and lush and complex vegetation mixes may develop. Western white pine is a frequent associate of ponderosa pine with an occasional paper birch (Betula papyrifera). A rich understory of shrubs, grasses, and forbs occur in these forests. Early seral-species such as redstem ceanothus (Ceanothus sanguineus), snowbrush ceanothus (Ceanothus velutinus) and Sitka alder (Alnus viridis ssp. sinuata) rapidly colonize sites after disturbance and are also active nitrogen fixers. Mid-seral shrubs include Rocky Mountain maple which readily survives disturbances and is joined by late-seral species such as huckleberry (Vaccinium spp.) and false huckleberry (Menziesia ferruginea). The latter readily survives disturbances but is an aggressive colonizer. Probably one of the greatest competitors and survivors after disturbance of any ground-level species occurring with ponderosa pine is pinegrass. This ground-level vegetation can play critical roles in forests such as providing wildlife habitat, stabilizing soil, and capturing nutrients after disturbance. For example, fireweed (Chamerion angustifolium) rapidly regenerates after fire and captures and recycles nitrogen. Because of the range of species that can occur with ponderosa pine and their wide range of tolerance (e.g., shade, competition, fire) along with how they interact with disturbances a plethora of vegetative compositions and structures can occur within ponderosa pine forests arranged and interspersed in a variety of mosaics.

The impact of logging and ecological dynamics can cause some problems in maintaining good delineation of the ponderosa pine ecosystem. This ecosystem is idealized as open and parklike with an excellent ground cover of grasses, sedges, and forbs or with an understory of shrubs of low to medium height. In perhaps 60 percent of the area, the idealized open character of the ponderosa pine ecosystem has changed to that of a dense and growth-retarded stand, particularly in the Pacific Northwest.

== Fauna ==
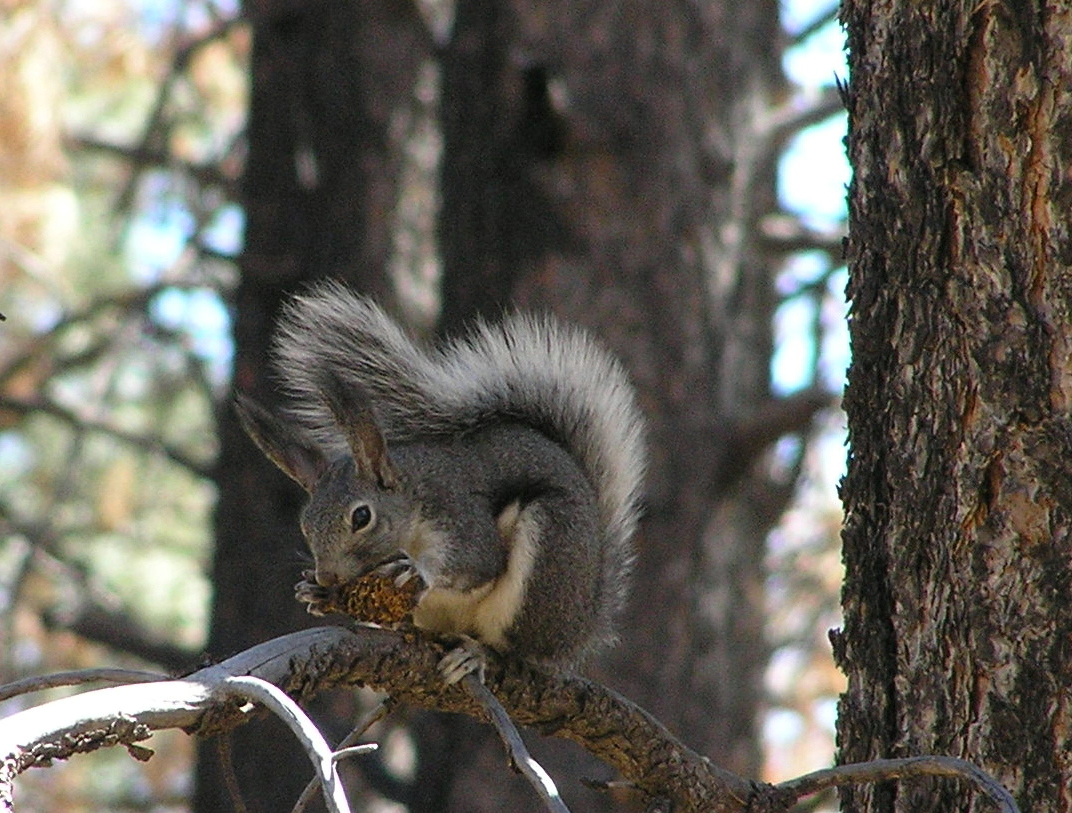
Abert's squirrel is only found in mature ponderosa pine forest.

The large mammals that inhabit the ponderosa pine ecosystem are the Rocky Mountain elk, mule deer, mountain lion, and coyote. Smaller animals include the bushy-tailed woodrat, white-footed mouse, bobcat, rock squirrel, cottontail rabbit, porcupine, and golden-mantled ground squirrel. The Kaibab squirrel is rare and endemic to this ecosystem on Arizona's Kaibab Plateau on the north rim of the Grand Canyon.

Bird species that live in the ponderosa pine ecosystem include the pygmy nuthatch, Steller's jay, sharp-shinned hawk, Rocky Mountain nuthatch, mountain chickadee, Cassin's finch, redshafted flicker, red-backed junco, northern goshawk, and western red-tailed hawk. Birds that are common during the summer include the western bluebird, Audubon's warbler, Williamson's sapsucker, western chipping sparrow, horned owl, and band-tailed pigeon.

== Soils ==
Ponderosa pine grows on a variety of soils ranging from volcanic to sedimentary origin. The physical properties of the soil, and thus its moisture-retaining capacity, play an important role in the tree's development, possibly more than the chemistry of the soil. Studies have shown strong relationships between the vertical growth of ponderosa pine and soil depth. In the Black Hills of South Dakota, soil depth had more influence on tree height than soil parent material. In Montana, pine growth response has been related to soil type, effective soil depth, landform, and moisture availability. Increased water at a site increased plant growth regardless of the soil type and landform. The high water tables associated with springs tend to increase site productivity regardless of the soil type and landform.

Along the western edge of the Columbia Plateau and the east slope of the Cascade Mountains, common soil types are mollisols, inceptisols, entisols, and aridisols. In northern and eastern California, ponderosa pine stands are associated with ultisols. In the Okanogan Highlands at the northern edge of the Columbia Plateau and in much of the Northern Rocky Mountains, pine and the related forest types occur on inceptisols; the soils of the rest of these areas are largely alfisols and entisols. In the Blue and Wallowa Mountains of eastern Oregon, pine stands occupy mollisols. In the Middle and Southern Rocky Mountains, pines and associates are on mollisols, aridisols, entisols, and alfisols. Pine stands in the Gila Mountains are largely on mollisols. The small stands of pine in the Great Basin are on aridisols.

== Disturbances ==
=== Wildfire ===
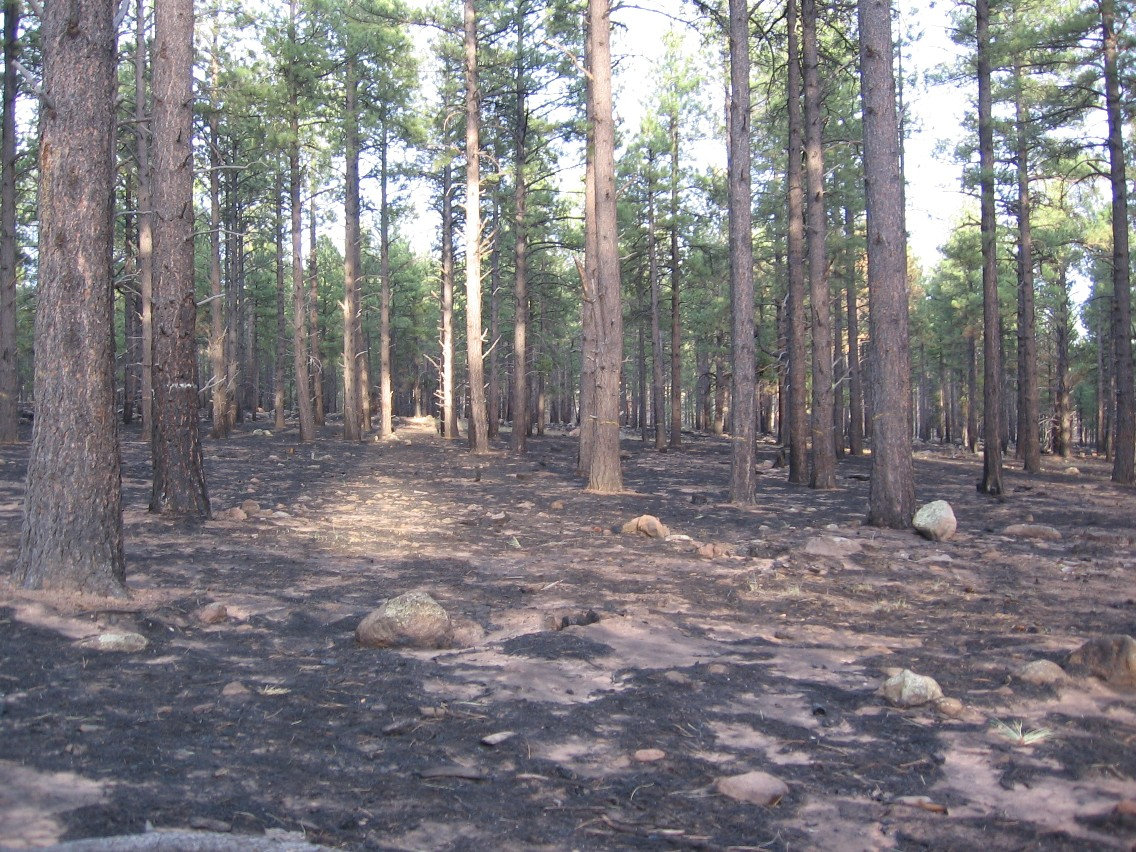
Result of prescribed burn in the ponderosa pine forest of the Coconino National Forest, Arizona

Before successful fire exclusion, temperature and precipitation patterns combined with natural and human ignitions allowed fires to burn the dry ponderosa pine forests at relatively frequent (e.g., < 40 years) intervals, even as frequent as every 6.5 years in Arizona. Cultural burning by Native Americans augmented and even dominated burning in several locations. In the northern Rocky Mountains of Idaho and western Montana, dry settings of ponderosa pine forests historically burned by low severity surface fires that did not kill overstory trees at 15 to 23 year mean return intervals.

Ponderosa pine forests appear to have evolved with fire and many authors have suggested that their composition and structure are dependent on the vegetation's relations with fire. However, when wildfires burn altered ponderosa pine forests, the extent or area burned is similar to historical times but they tend to burn more severely. They often kill large continuous expanses of vegetation, consume the forest floor, volatilize nutrients, provide for exotic species introductions, increase soil erosion, and, in general, create forest conditions that may not be favorable to society. The long-term consequences are not well understood for issues such as water quality and wildlife habitat. Nor will the sense of place that forests often provide which, in some cases, will not be replaced for many generations.

=== Other ===
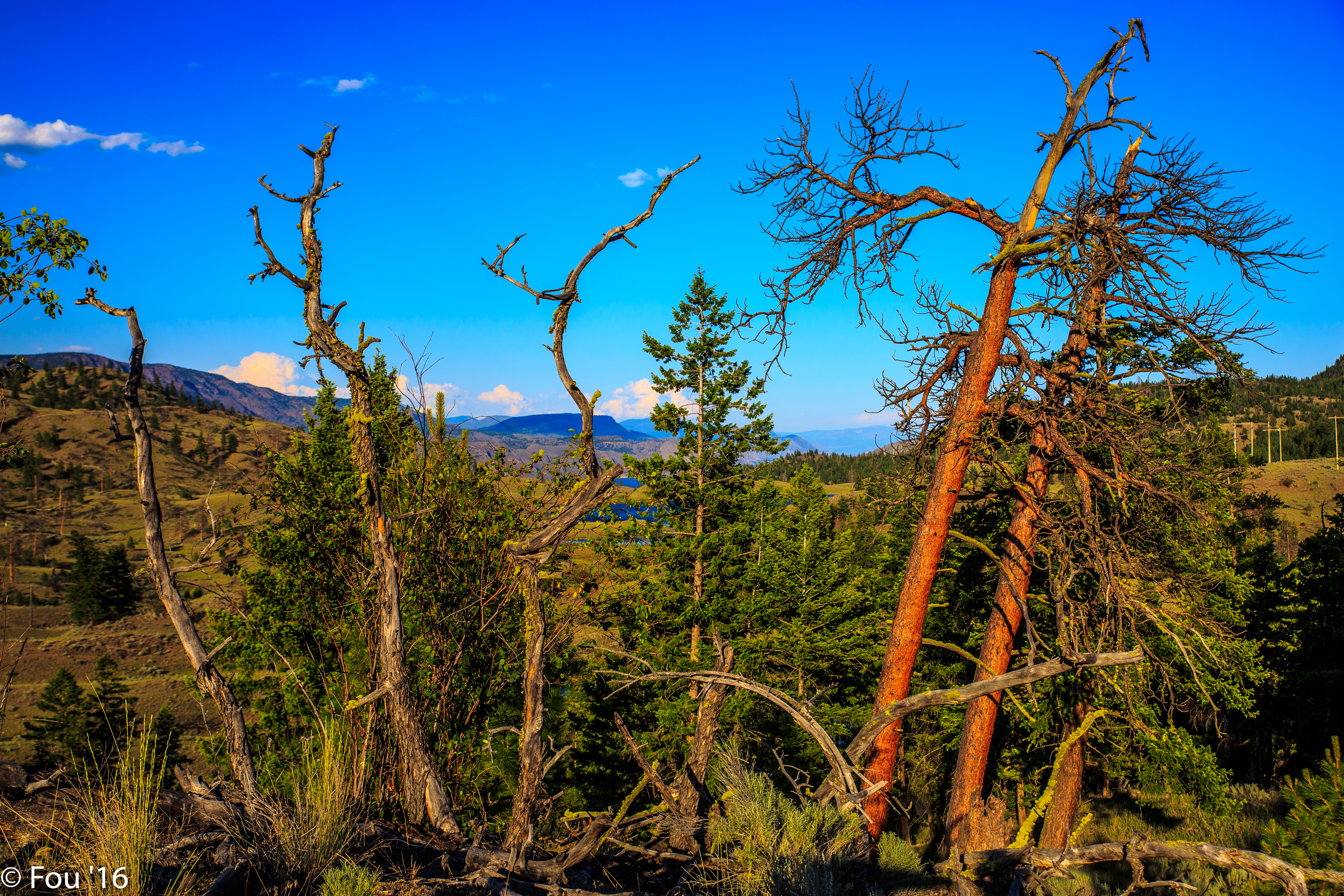
Ponderosa pine stand in British Columbia affected by bark beetles

In the western United States domestic livestock grazing and harvesting of ponderosa pine forests was occurring by the mid-1800s. Ponderosa pine was extensively harvested, altering both forest composition and structure. In mesic forests, grand fir and/or white fir and Douglas-fir rapidly colonized these sites when ponderosa pine was harvested. Especially on the ponderosa pine PVT, grass cover tended to decrease ponderosa pine seedling establishment and survival. However, when heavy livestock grazing ceased in the early 1900s in the southwestern United States, dense stands of ponderosa pine seedlings became established. Because of fire exclusion, climate changes, and other factors these trees readily developed into dense stands.

The dense stands that developed increased the abundance of insect and disease epidemics, and when combined with fire exclusion, significantly altered the composition and structure of these forests. Historically, western pine beetle (Dendroctonus brevicomis), pine engraver (Ips spp.), fir engraver (Scolytus ventralis), Douglas-fir tussock moth (Orgyia pseudotsugata) were insects associated with regularly burned areas. In most years bark beetles occurred at endemic levels in ponderosa pine, Douglas-fir, and grand fir killing large and weakened trees that were struck by lightning, infected by root disease (Armillaria spp.), or too old to resist attack. Pine engraver and fir engraver beetles attacked young, densely stocked ponderosa pine or removed trees scorched by low-intensity surface fires and/or trees severely infected with disease. Sometimes disease and insect infestations increased during droughts when trees were stressed.

After a century of fire suppression, these same insects have occurred at epidemic levels in some locations. Ponderosa pine continues to be susceptible to the western pine beetle and mountain pine beetle. These beetles often kill ponderosa pine on Douglas-fir and grand fir/white fir PVTs. The pine engraver beetle is more abundant and destructive with some of the severest outbreaks occurring on low-elevation ponderosa pine PVTs. Pandora moth (Coloradia pandora) defoliates ponderosa pine and scattered outbreaks have occurred in Arizona, California, Colorado, and Oregon during the 20th century. The larvae prefer loose soils created by weathered granites or pumice where they burrow and pupate. In addition to ponderosa pine being damaged by insects, dense stands of Douglas-fir and grand fir or white fir that developed on many settings arevery susceptible to both defoliators and root diseases.

== See also ==
- Maritime Coast Range Ponderosa Pine forests
- Rocky Mountain ponderosa pine forest
- California Floristic Province
