= Chionodes ceanothiella =

Scientific classification
- Kingdom: Animalia
- Phylum: Arthropoda
- Clade: Pancrustacea
- Class: Insecta
- Order: Lepidoptera
- Family: Gelechiidae
- Genus: Chionodes
- Species: C. ceanothiella

Binomial name
- Chionodes ceanothiella (Busck, 1904)

Synonyms
- Gelechia ceanothiella Busck, 1904; Gelechia marinensis Keifer, 1935

Species of moth

Chionodes ceanothiella is a moth in the family Gelechiidae. It is found in North America, where it has been recorded from Alberta and British Columbia to California and Utah.

The wingspan is about 19 mm. The forewings are dark purplish brown, with a small yellow streak on the middle of the fold, followed by blackish scales. Obliquely above this in the cell is a blackish dot partly surrounded by yellow scales and at the end of the cell is another similar spot. At apical third is a small yellow costal streak and around the apical edge is a more or less complete series of small yellow dots. The hindwings are dark fuscous.

The larvae feed on Ceanothus sanguineus, Ceanothus thyrsiflorus, Ceanothus sorediatus and Ceanothus integerrimus.
