= Rocky Mountain ponderosa pine forest =

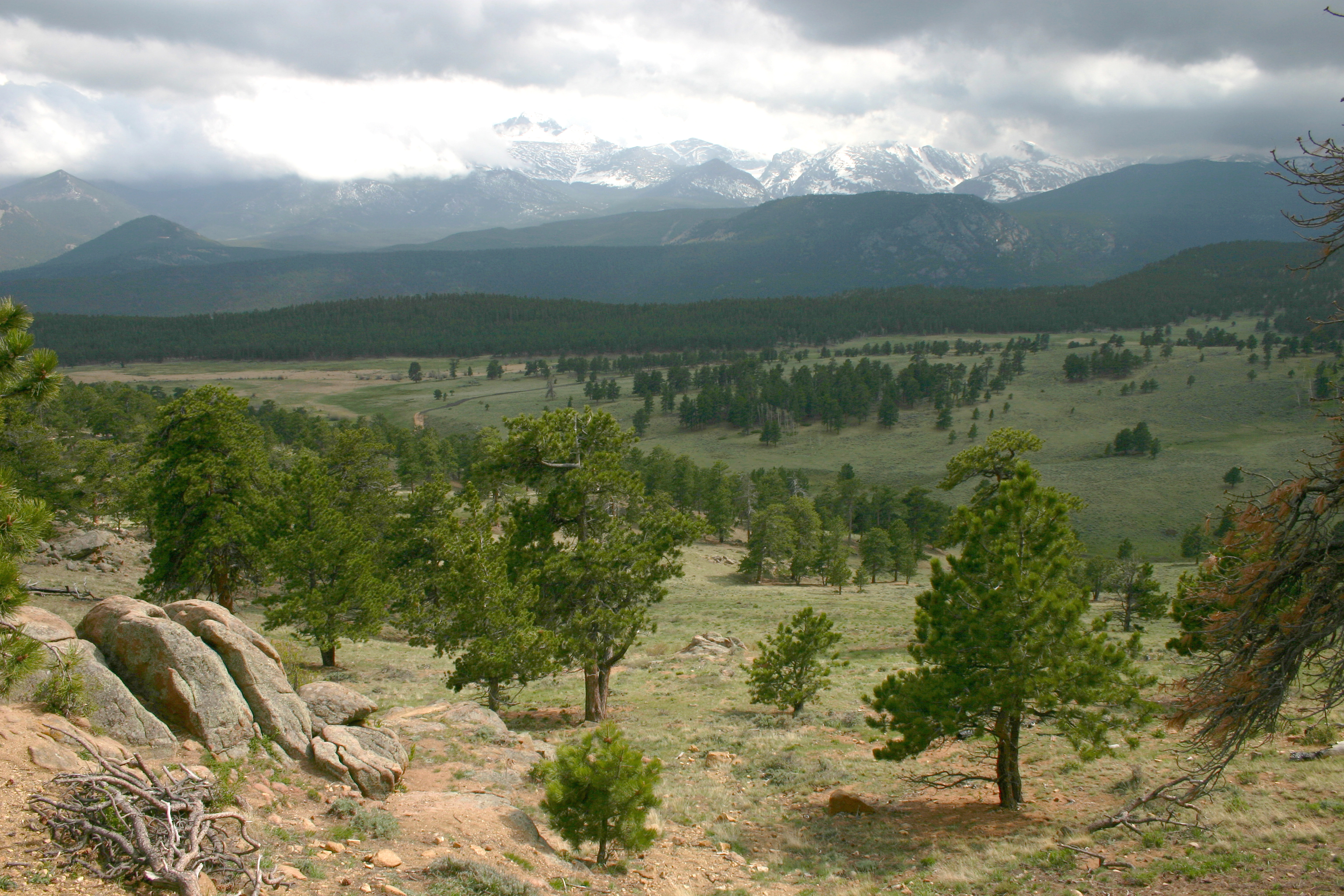
Ponderosa pine forest in Rocky Mountain National Park

The Rocky Mountain ponderosa pine forest is a plant community at an elevation of 6,600–8,900 feet (2,000–2,700 m) in the Rocky Mountains. It is an important temperate coniferous forest ecoregion, including some endemic wildlife and grass species that are only found in this ponderosa pine (Pinus ponderosa var. scopulorum) habitat.

== Ecology ==
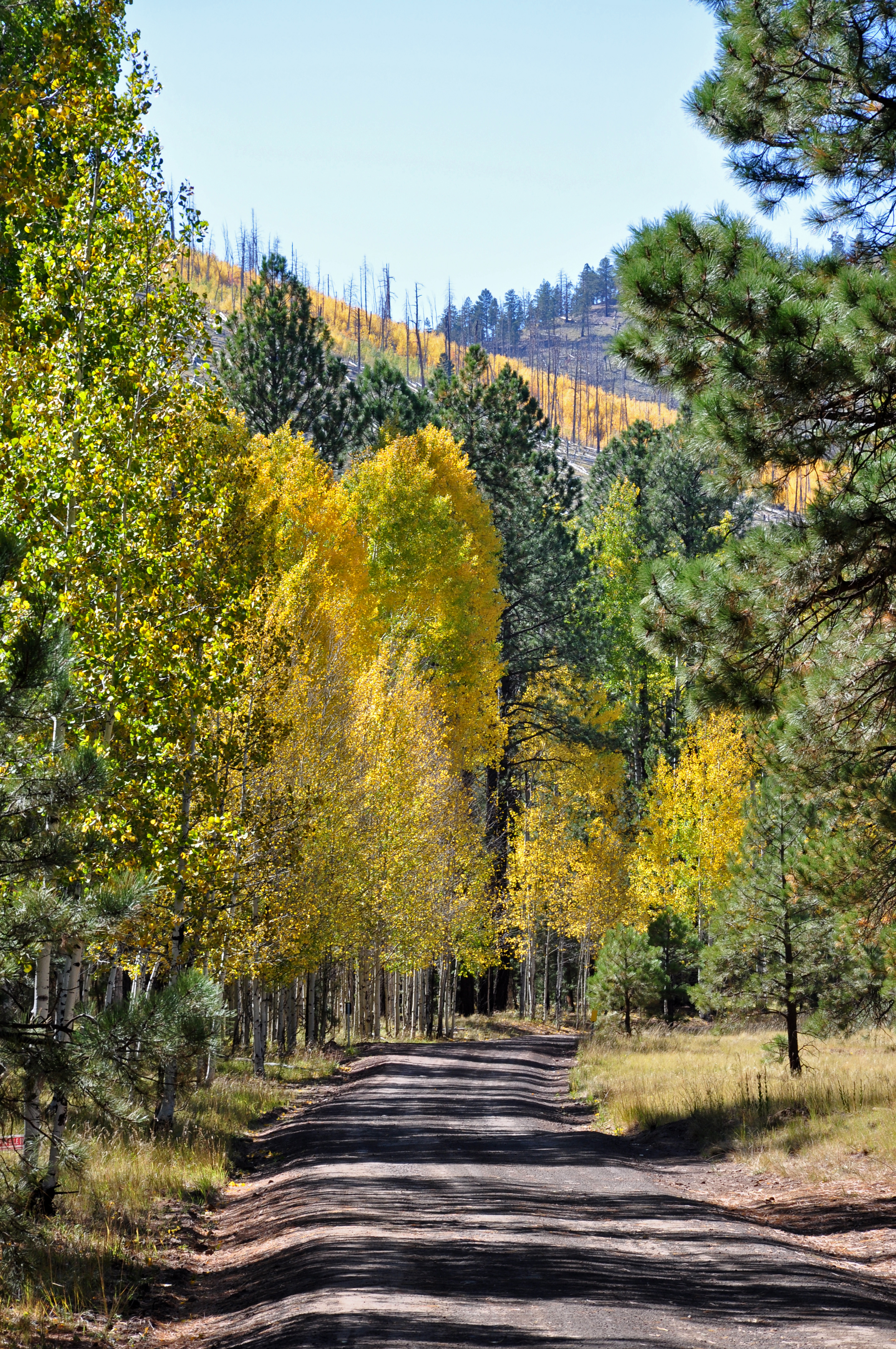
Mixed ponderosa pine and quaking aspen forest, Arizona

Ponderosa pine occurs as a mid-seral species and Douglas-fir is the climax forest in the Rocky Mountains. Quaking aspen and lodgepole pine are early-seral associates of ponderosa pine on these sites. Ground-level vegetation includes ninebark (Physocarpus spp.), elk sedge (Carex geyeri), and pine grass (Calamagrostis rubescens). These species, in particular, exemplify aggressive survivors after disturbance (e.g., fire, mechanical site preparation) and are strong competitors for light and nutrients which compete with ponderosa pine seedlings.

Three are three main sources of stand-replacing disturbance to Rocky Mountain ponderosa pine forests: wildfire, mountain pine beetles, and windstorms. Historically, by far the most common of these is wildfire.

== Climate ==
The pure stands of Rocky Mountain ponderosa pine forest receive about 15–20 inches (380–510 mm) of annual precipitation. In the northern Rockies, about 40-50% falls in April through September, while in the southern Rockies, about 66-75% falls during these months. During these months there is high evapotranspiration because Populus tremuloides intercept a lot of the precipitation. The average temperature for this community is, on average, warmer than other conifer communities studied. The average temperature is approximately 5 to 8 °C (41 to 46 °F), creating 50-100 frost-free days per year.

== Wildlife ==
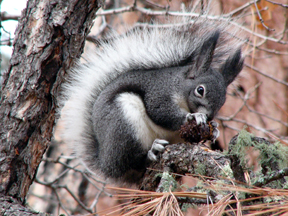
Abert's squirrel

The ponderosa pine forest, unlike the lodgepole pine and spruce/fir forests, supports numerous mammal species including Abert's squirrel (Sciurus aberti), which only lives in ponderosa pine communities. S. aberti usually prefers a cluster of trees and feeds on the seeds of the cones. S. aberti has also adapted to the chemicals ponderosa pine produces for protection by targeting the trees that have lowered chemical levels. Pygmy nuthatches (Sitta pygmaea) are also adapted to ponderosa pine woodlands. Another species that can be supported by ponderosa pine is the Colorado chipmunk (Tamias quadrivitattus). T. quadrivitattus helps spread the seeds of the ponderosa pine by spreading out and burying its caches. This results in the seeds being further from the trees and better germination rates. This community also hosts the gopher snake (Pituophis catenifera), which burrows into gopher holes. Also, ponderosa pine provides habitat for the cougar (Puma concolor) and the bobcat (Lynx rufus) as well as birds as western tanager (Piranga ludoviciana), wild turkey (Meleagris gallopavo), mountain bluebird (Sialia currucoides), and white-breasted nuthatch (Sitta carolinensis). The species present in this area affect the vegetation and provide aesthetic value for the people who use this area recreationally.

There is less canopy cover in a ponderosa pine community compared to a lodgepole pine (Pinus contorta) and spruce/fir community, resulting in more grasses, forbs, and shrubs. The high species richness of the understory in this community makes it preferred by grazing animals such as elk (Cervus elaphus), deer (Odocoileus hemionus), and moose (Alces alces).

== Wildfire ==
In the northern Rocky Mountains of Idaho and western Montana, dry settings of ponderosa pine forests historically burned by low severity surface fires that did not kill overstory trees at 15 to 23 year mean return intervals. Cultural burning by Native Americans augmented and even dominated burning in several locations.

Historically, crown fires naturally occurred in Rocky Mountain ponderosa pine forests, and caused even-aged stands to grow, which were then partially replaced by low-intensity fires. The variability in fire intensity differs from the historical pattern of ponderosa pine forests in the Southwest.

== See also ==
- Ponderosa pine forest
- Colorado Rockies forests
- Rocky Mountain Floristic Region
- South Central Rockies forests
- Temperate coniferous forests
