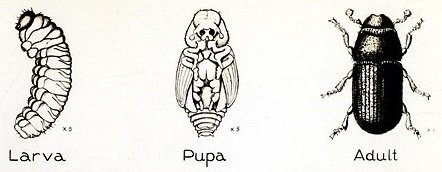
- Life stages of D. brevicomis

Scientific classification
- Kingdom: Animalia
- Phylum: Arthropoda
- Clade: Pancrustacea
- Class: Insecta
- Order: Coleoptera
- Suborder: Polyphaga
- Infraorder: Cucujiformia
- Family: Curculionidae
- Genus: Dendroctonus
- Species: D. brevicomis

Binomial name
- Dendroctonus brevicomis LeConte, 1876

= Dendroctonus brevicomis =

Species of beetle

Dendroctonus brevicomis, the western pine beetle, is a species of crenulate bark beetle in the family Curculionidae. It is found in North America and parts of Mexico. It is known as a destructive pest of ponderosa and Coulter pine trees. When drought makes these pines more susceptible to infestations by D. brevicomis, there is an increased risk of forest fires due to dead trees.

The beetle may cause mortality of 60 to 90 percent of host trees in some landscapes during an outbreak. One of the more recent notable outbreaks occurred in the central and southern Sierra Nevada Range in California from 2014 to 2017, causing the death of millions of ponderosa pines.

Adult D. brevicomis are brown or black beetles 3–5 mm in length. Females carve lengthy egg galleries in the wood, damaging the trees.

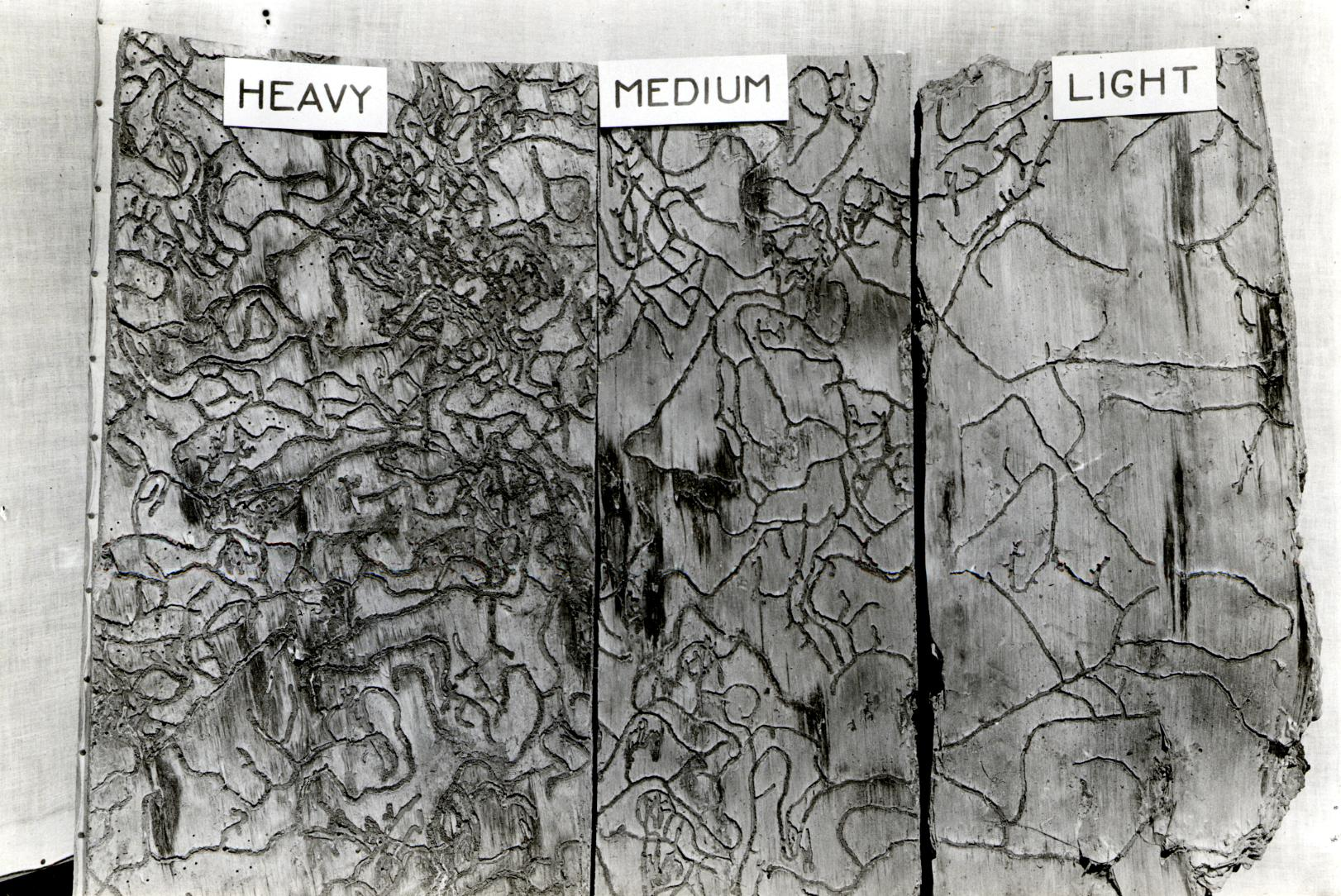
Examples of D. brevicomis egg galleries in ponderosa pine
