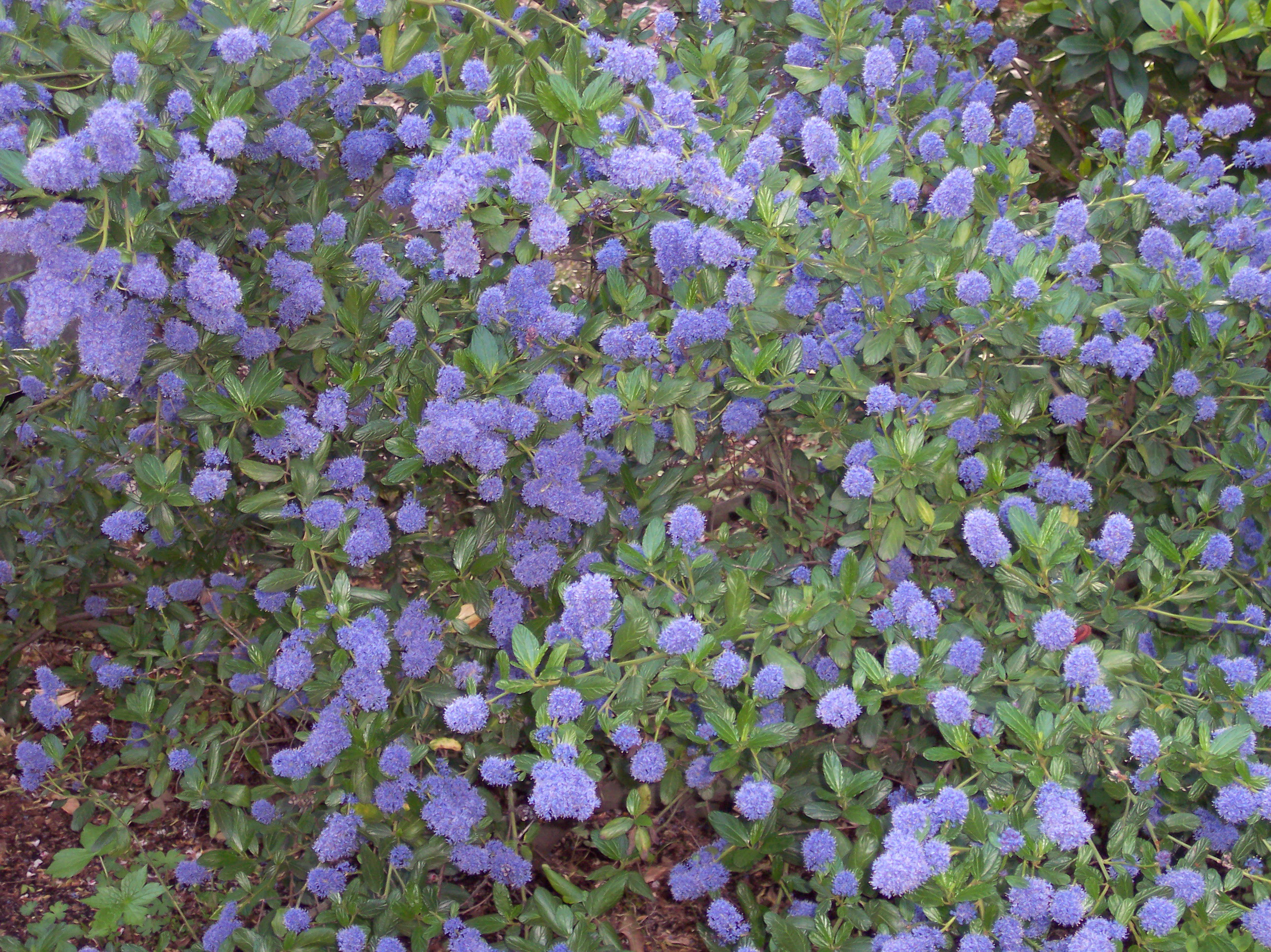

Conservation status
- Least Concern (IUCN 3.1)

- Secure (NatureServe)

Scientific classification
- Kingdom: Plantae
- Clade: Tracheophytes
- Clade: Angiosperms
- Clade: Eudicots
- Clade: Rosids
- Order: Rosales
- Family: Rhamnaceae
- Genus: Ceanothus
- Species: C. thyrsiflorus

Binomial name
- Ceanothus thyrsiflorus Eschsch.

Varieties
- Ceanothus thyrsiflorus var. obispoensis D.O.Burge; Ceanothus thyrsiflorus var. thyrsiflorus
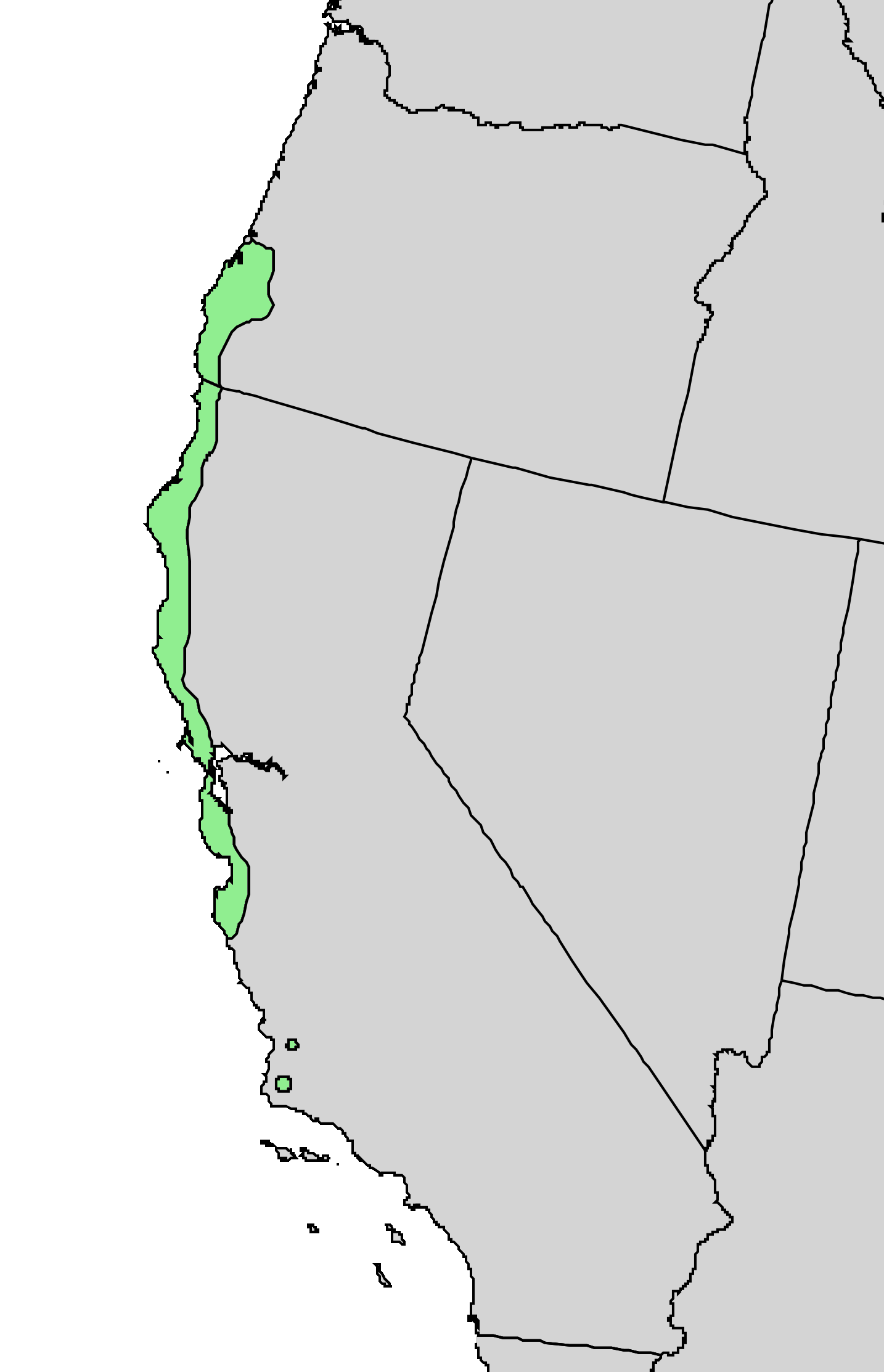
- Natural range of Ceanothus thyrsiflorus

Synonyms
- synonyms of var. thyrsiflorus: Ceanothus elegans Lem.; Ceanothus thyrsiflorus var. chandleri Jeps.; Ceanothus thyrsiflorus var. repens McMinn; Forrestia thyrsoides Raf.

= Ceanothus thyrsiflorus =

Species of evergreen shrub

Ceanothus thyrsiflorus, known as blueblossom or blue blossom ceanothus, is an evergreen shrub in the buckthorn family Rhamnaceae that is native to Oregon and California in the western United States and the state of Baja California in northwestern Mexico. The terms 'Californian lilac' and 'Mountain lilac' are also applied to this and other varieties of ceanothus, though it is not closely related to Syringa, the true lilac.

Two varieties are accepted:

- Ceanothus thyrsiflorus var. obispoensis D.O.Burge
- Ceanothus thyrsiflorus var. thyrsiflorus

== Description ==
Ceanothus thyrsiflorus can grow more than 6 meters (20 ft) tall and broad in its native chaparral habitat, with glossy green leaves. The clusters of tiny flowers, borne in spring, vary from different shades of blue to close to white. The evergreen leaves are shiny and about 4 cm (1 1/2 in) long.

== Etymology ==
The Latin genus name Ceanothus is derived from the Ancient Greek keánōthos (κεάνωθος) 'a spiny plant'. The name was originally used by Theophrastus for another plant, and Linnaeus reused it for Ceanothus.

== Ecology ==
It is popular with birds, butterflies, and other pollinators. It is often visited by honeybees for its pollen.

== Cultivation ==
Ceanothus thyrsiflorus has been used in gardens extensively. It prefers a warm, sheltered position in full sun. Several cultivars have been selected, including:

- 'Blue Mound' which can grow to 1.5 m (4 ft 11 in) tall
- 'Cascade' which may reach 8 m (26 ft) of height
- 'El Dorado', a variegated cultivar with gold edge foliage and powder blue flowers
- 'Repens' which stays as a shrub around 1–3 m (3 ft 3 in – 9 ft 10 in) tall
- 'Repens Victoria', forming a sturdy evergreen mound and most useful groundcover with powder blue flowers
- 'Skylark', a tall type with blue flowers (this cultivar has gained the Royal Horticultural Society's Award of Garden Merit)
- 'Snow Flurry', with white flowers
