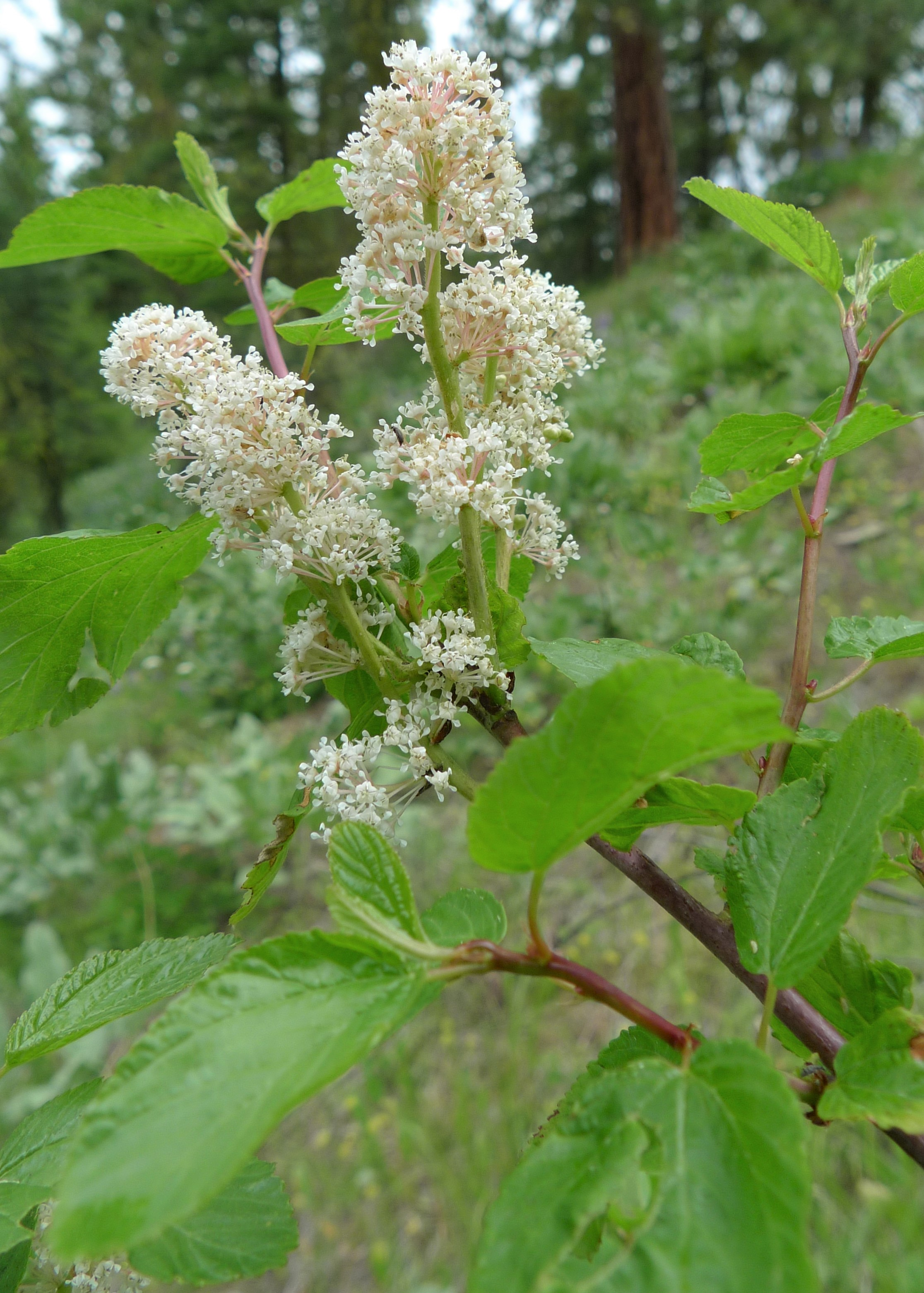
- Ceanothus sanguineus near Peshastin, Chelan County Washington

Scientific classification
- Kingdom: Plantae
- Clade: Tracheophytes
- Clade: Angiosperms
- Clade: Eudicots
- Clade: Rosids
- Order: Rosales
- Family: Rhamnaceae
- Genus: Ceanothus
- Species: C. sanguineus

Binomial name
- Ceanothus sanguineus Pursh

Synonyms
- Ceanothus oreganus

= Ceanothus sanguineus =

Species of flowering plant

Ceanothus sanguineus is a species of shrub in the family Rhamnaceae known by the common name redstem ceanothus. It is native to western North America from British Columbia to Montana to far northern California; it is also known from Michigan. It grows in temperate coniferous forest habitat in forest openings amidst the conifers. This is an erect shrub approaching 3 meters in maximum height. Its stem is red to purple in color, its woody parts green and hairless when new. The deciduous leaves are alternately arranged and up to about 10 centimeters long. They are thin, light green, oval, and generally edged with glandular teeth. The undersides are sometimes hairy. The inflorescence is a cluster of white flowers up to about 12 centimeters long. The fruit is a three-lobed smooth capsule about 4 millimeters long. This shrub is an important food plant for wild ungulates such as the Rocky Mountain Elk, it is browsed eagerly by many types of livestock, and the seed is consumed by many types of animals.

Their roots have nitrogen fixing nodules.
