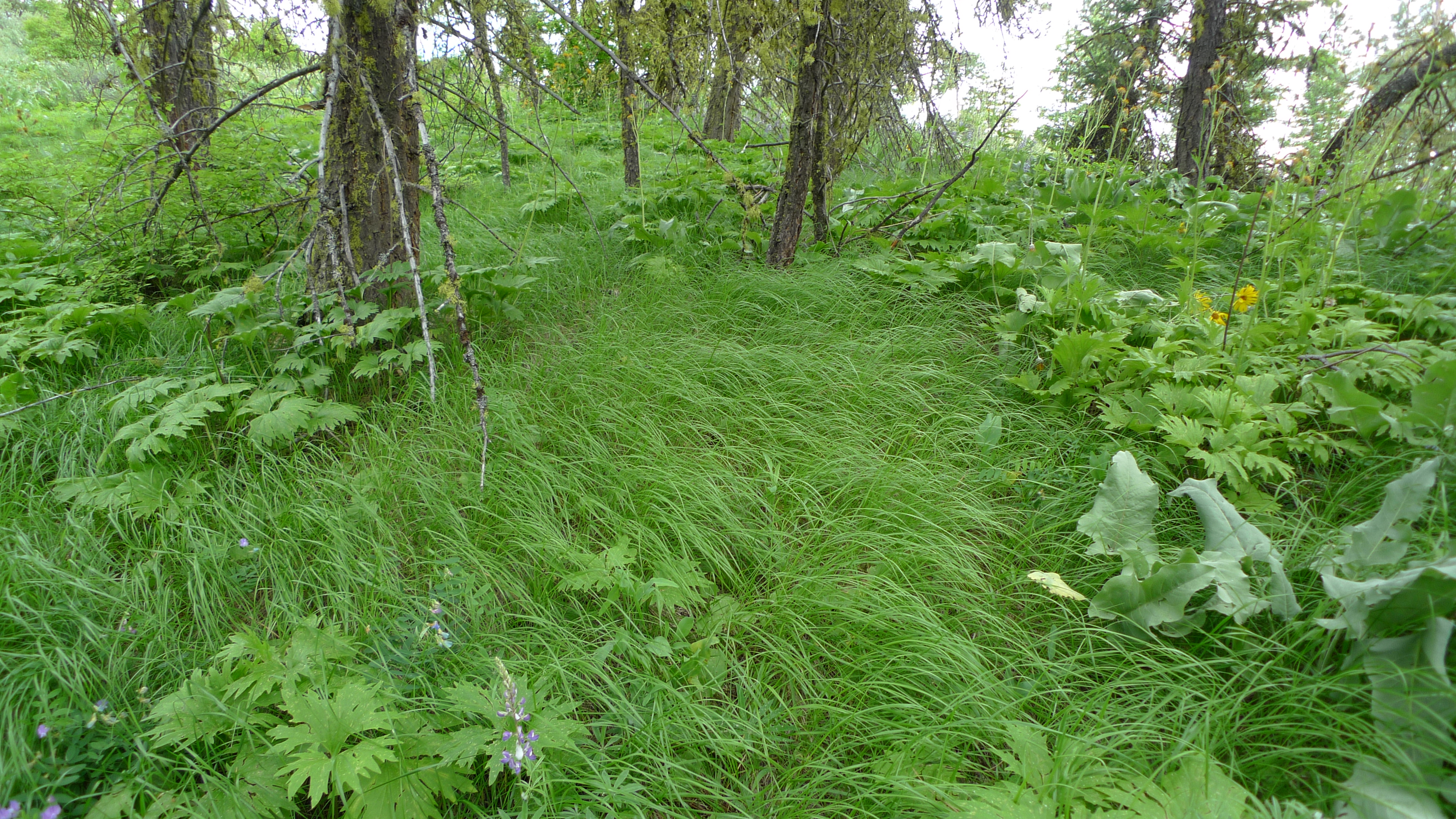
- Calamagrostis rubescens near Peshastin, Chelan County Washington

Scientific classification
- Kingdom: Plantae
- Clade: Tracheophytes
- Clade: Angiosperms
- Clade: Monocots
- Clade: Commelinids
- Order: Poales
- Family: Poaceae
- Subfamily: Pooideae
- Genus: Calamagrostis
- Species: C. rubescens

Binomial name
- Calamagrostis rubescens Buckley

= Calamagrostis rubescens =

Species of flowering plant

Calamagrostis rubescens is a species of grass known by the common name pinegrass.

== Distribution ==
It is native to western North America, including Canada from British Columbia to Manitoba and the United States from California to Colorado. It can be found in several types of habitat, including forest and woodlands.

== Description ==
It is a perennial bunchgrass growing erect to heights between 60 centimeters and one meter. The inflorescence is a dense bunch or open array of spikelets. Each spikelet is about half a centimeter long and has a bent or twisted awn about the same length.

This perennial grass grows mainly from creeping rhizomes. The leaves are mostly basal, narrow, and flat. The collar has conspicuous tufts of hair. The inflorescences is a narrow spike-like panicle usually less than 6" long. There is one floret per spikelet with several spikelets per branch. The awn on each floret is bent and twisted. Pinegrass is unusual in that it rarely flowers. It occurs in forest areas but only flowers under full sunlight in late June through August.

== Gallery ==
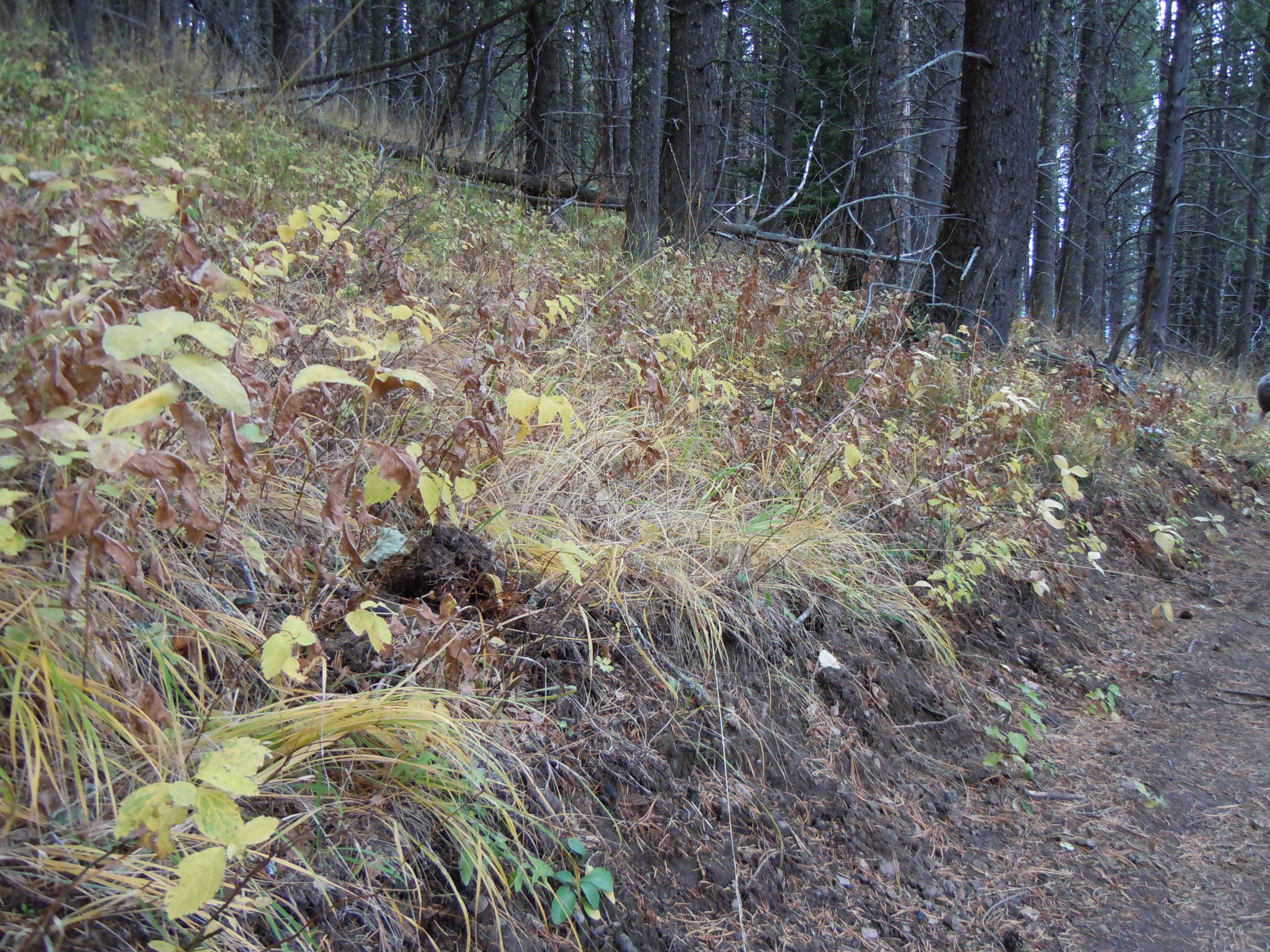

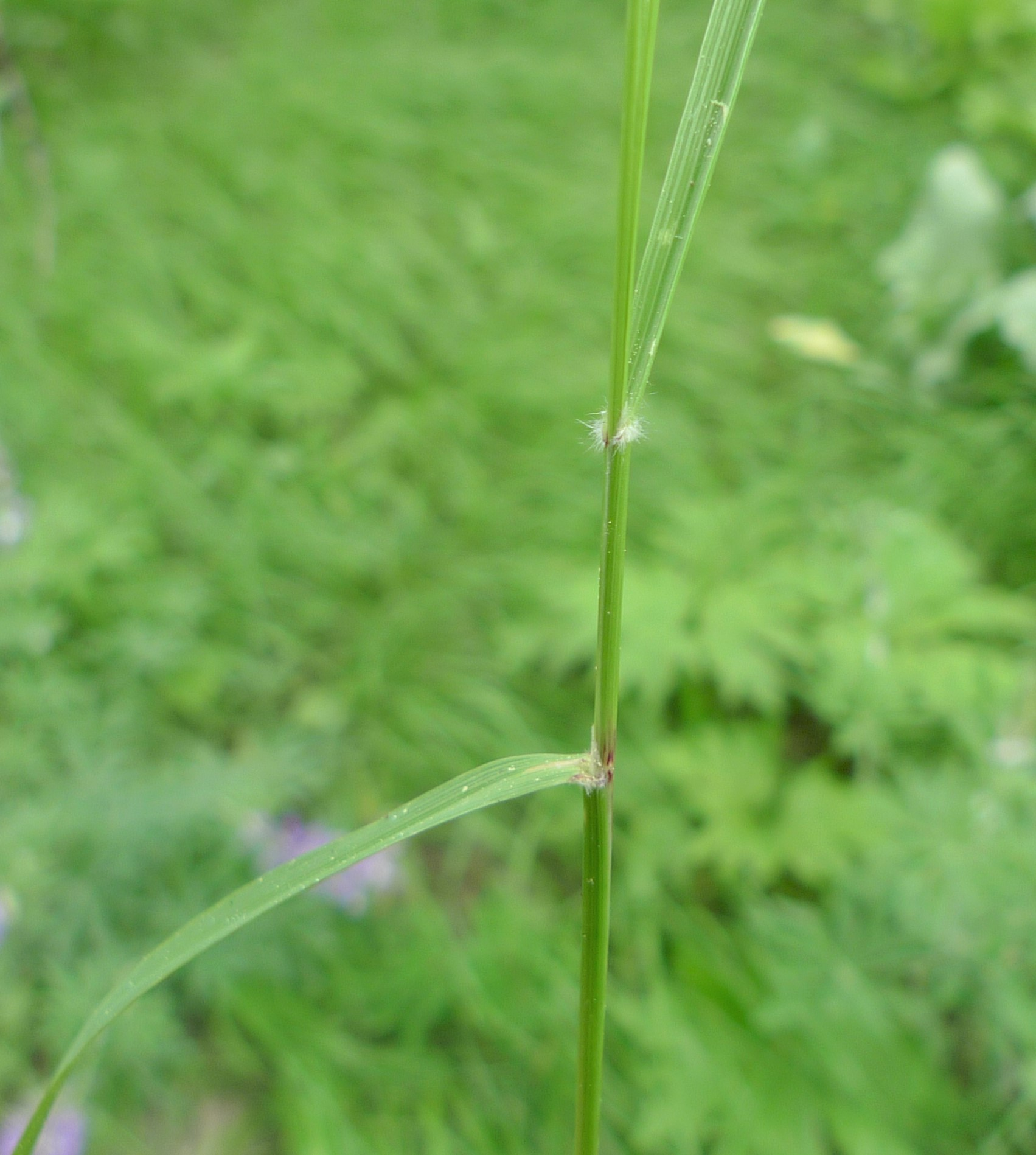

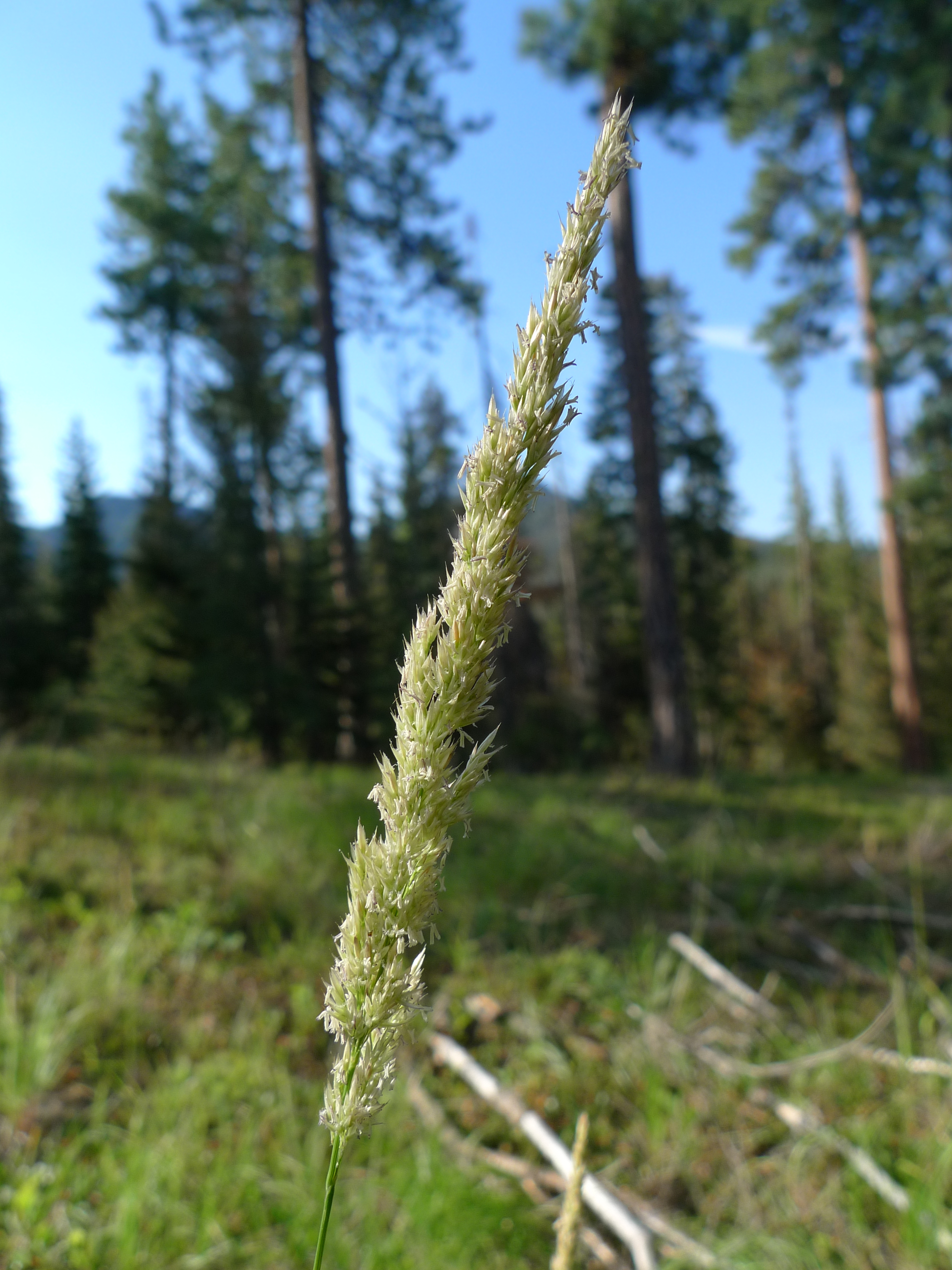

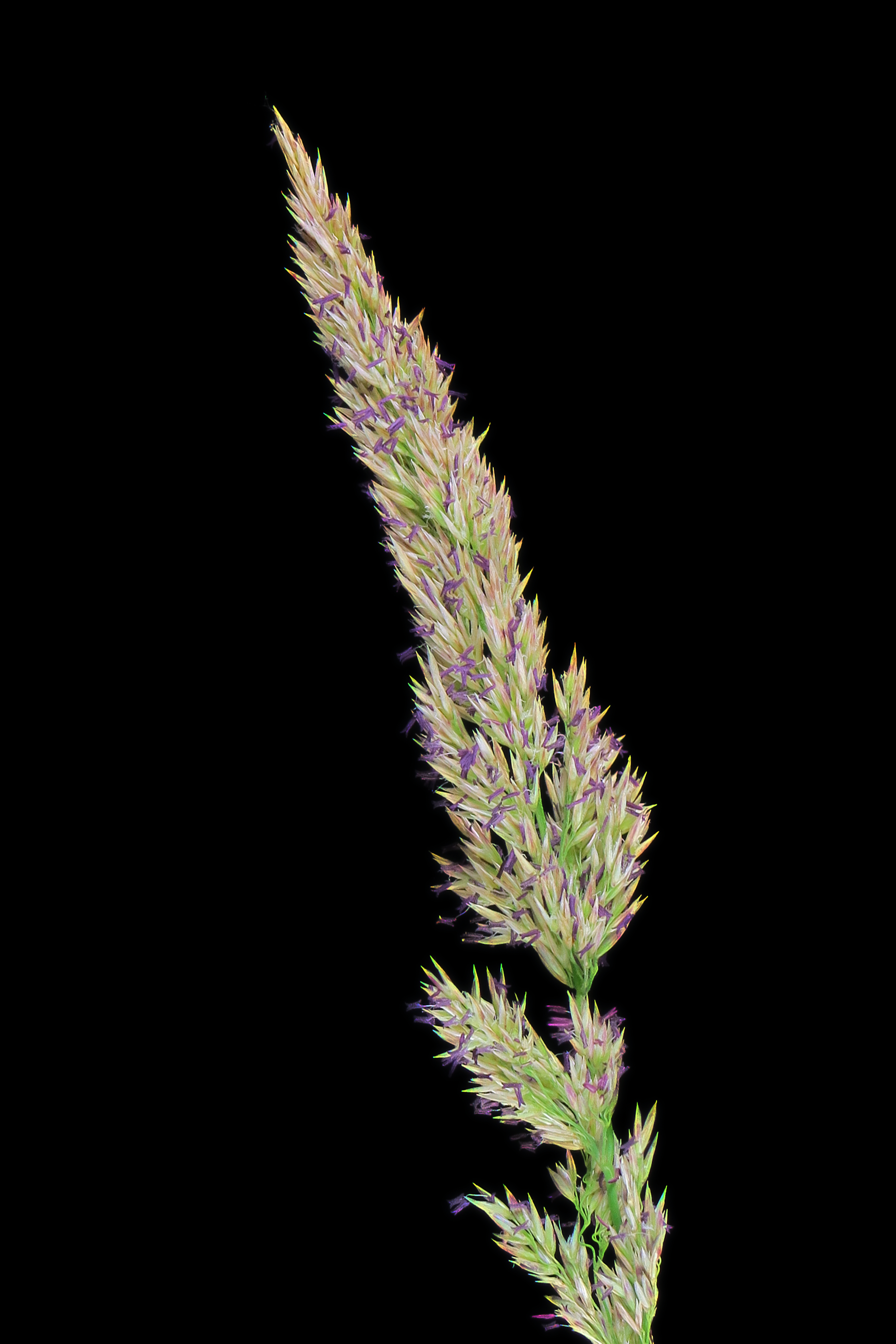

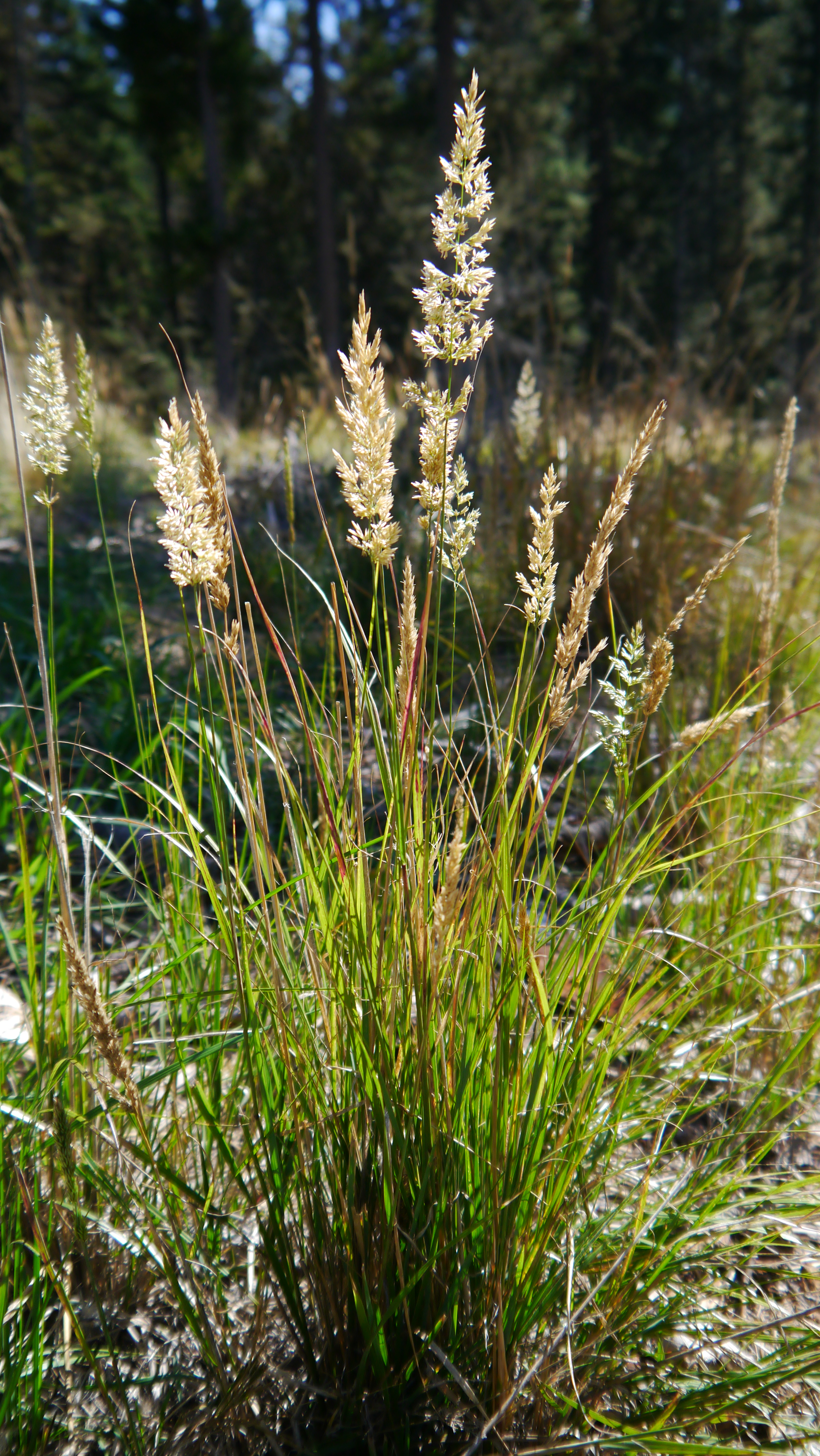

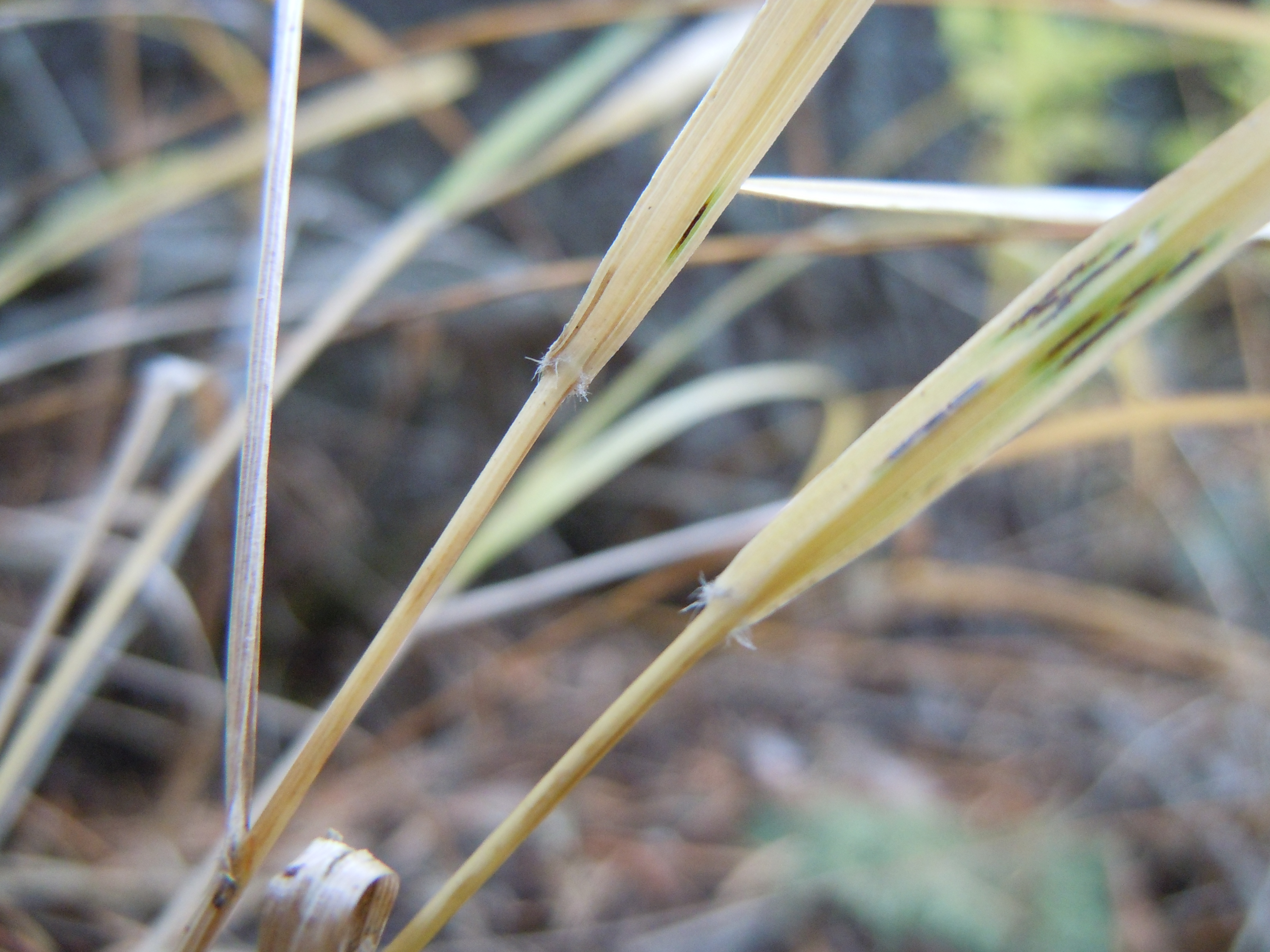
