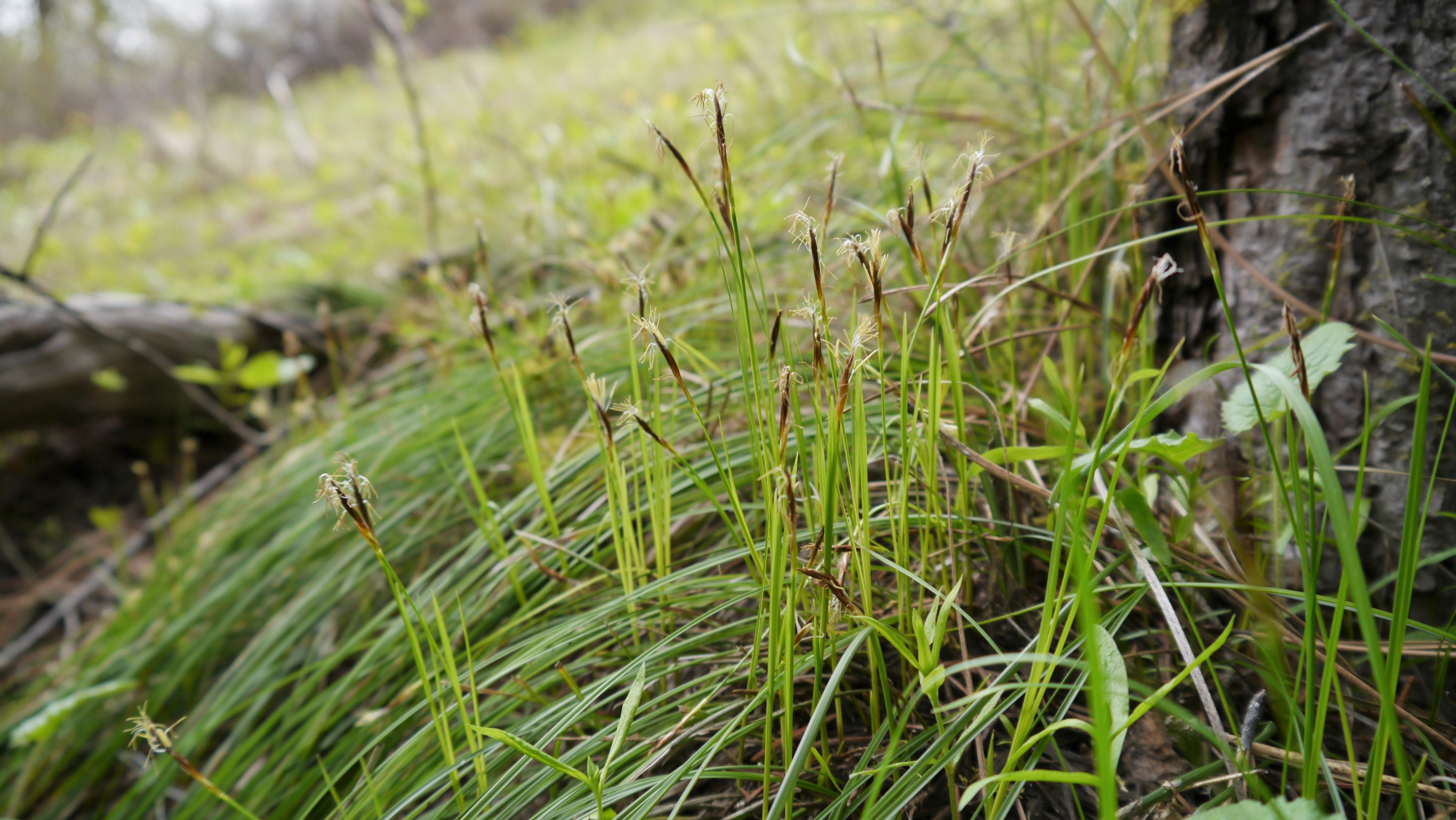
- Near Cashmere, Chelan County Washington

Scientific classification
- Kingdom: Plantae
- Clade: Tracheophytes
- Clade: Angiosperms
- Clade: Monocots
- Clade: Commelinids
- Order: Poales
- Family: Cyperaceae
- Genus: Carex
- Species: C. geyeri

Binomial name
- Carex geyeri Boott

= Carex geyeri =

Species of grass-like plant

Carex geyeri is a species of sedge known by the common names Geyer's sedge and elk sedge. It is native to western North America from British Columbia to California to Colorado, where it grows in dry areas in mountain meadows, grasslands, and open forest. This sedge produces scattered tufts of stems connected by a network of long rhizomes. The stems are triangular in cross-section and approach half a meter in maximum height. The inflorescence is composed of a cluster of staminate flowers and a cluster of pistillate flowers separated by a node.

== Gallery ==
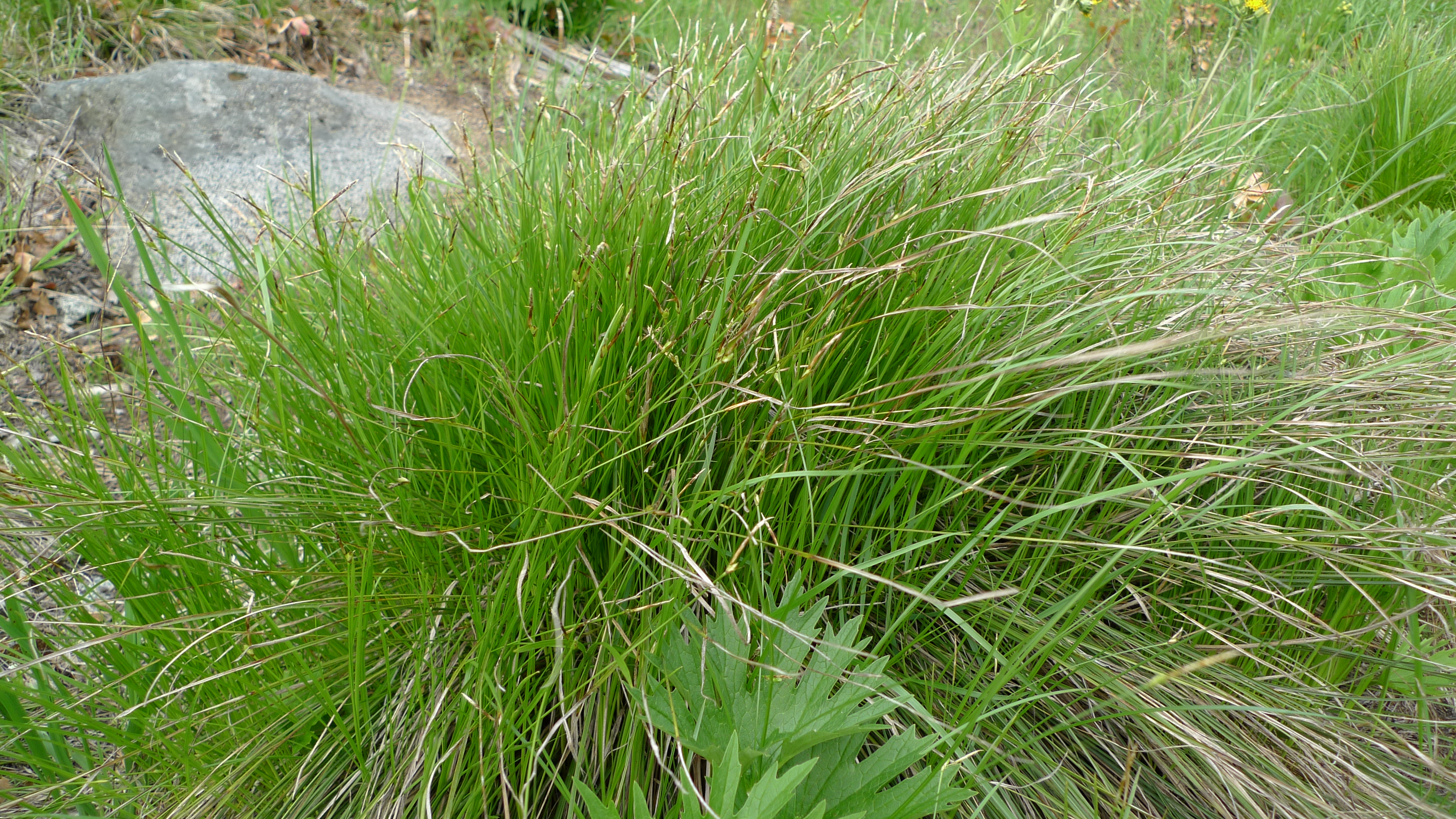

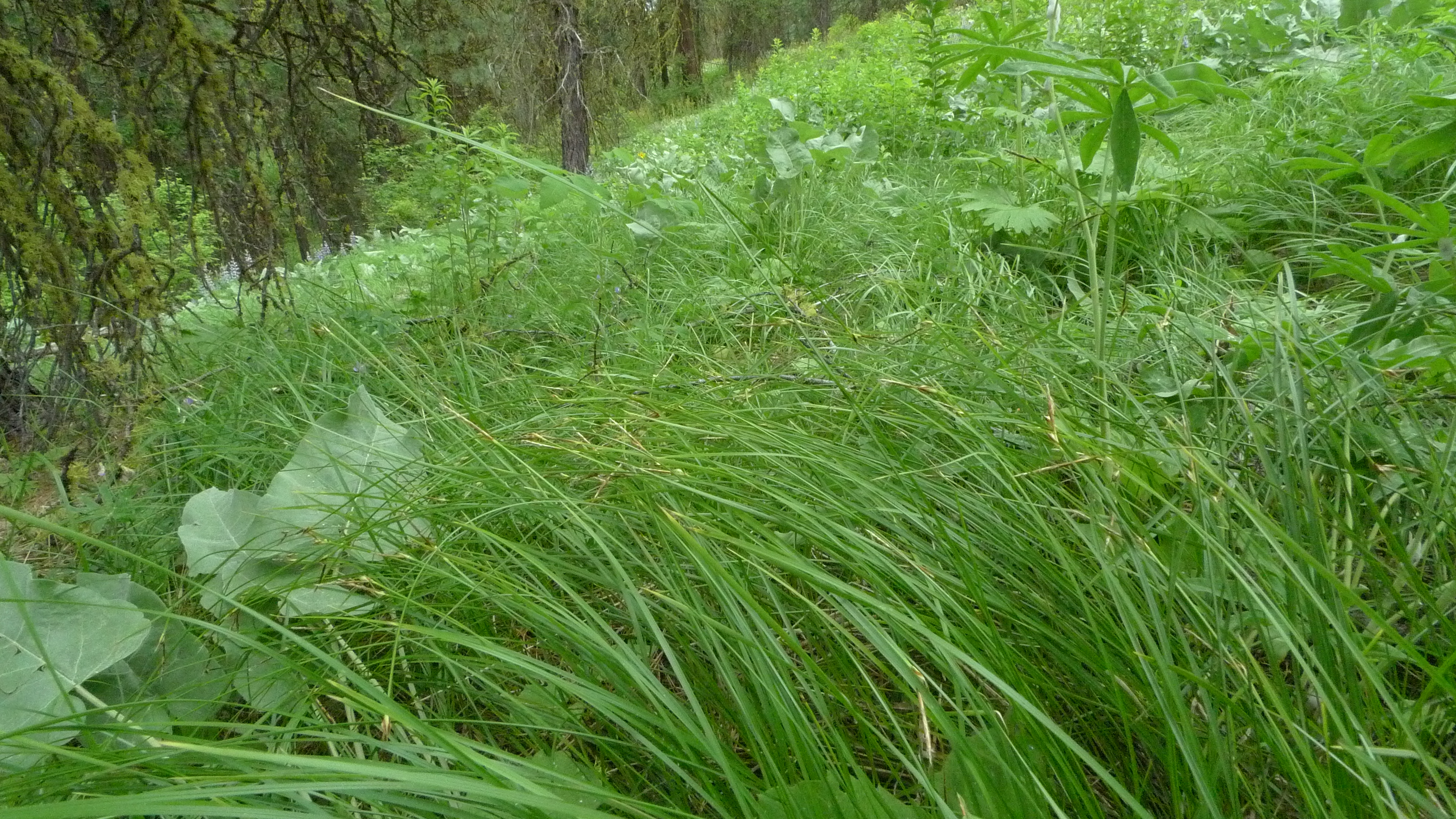

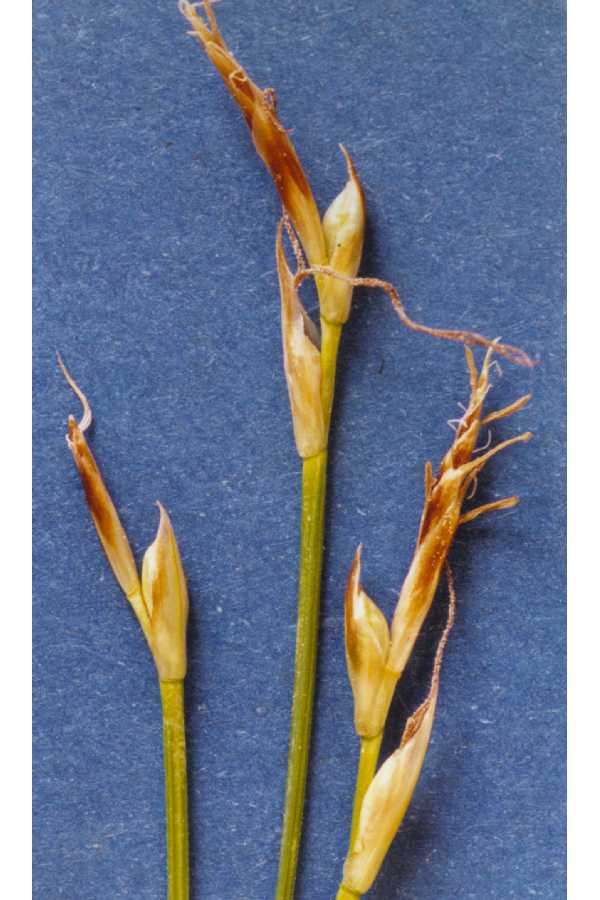

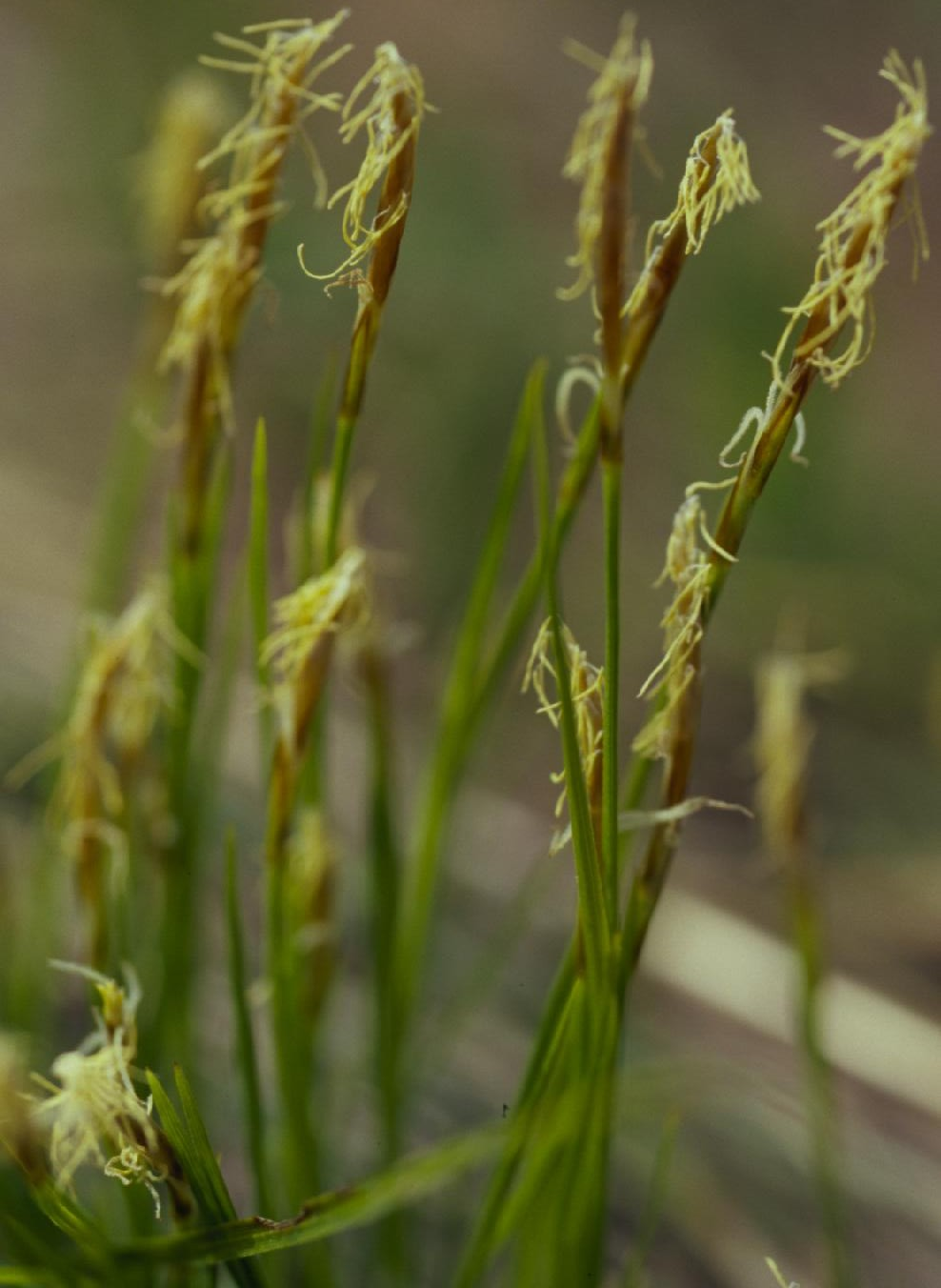
